= The Boomtown Rats discography =

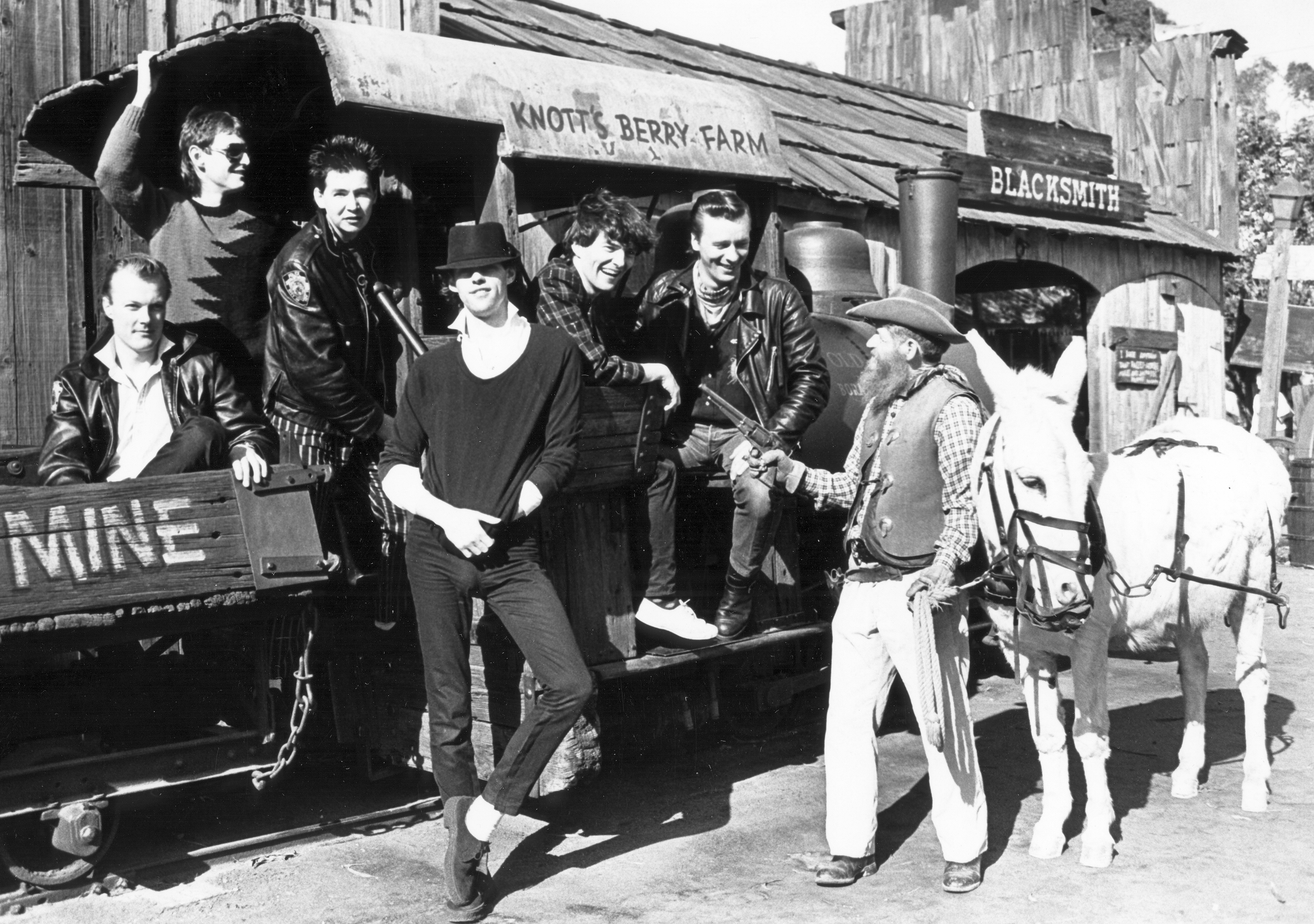
- The band at Knott’s Berry Farm in 1981
- Studio albums: 7
- Extended plays: 1
- Live albums: 4
- Compilation albums: 7
- Singles: 23
- Video albums: 3

The discography of Irish new wave group The Boomtown Rats consists of seven studio albums, seven compilation albums, 23 singles and three video albums. The Boomtown Rats' debut release was the 1977 single "Lookin' After No. 1" which was originally written by frontman Bob Geldof in 1975 while waiting for his local unemployment office to open in his native Dun Laoghaire then a major port an hour south of central Dublin. The group's next single "Mary of the 4th Form" was released in the same year, along with their self-titled debut album.

== Albums ==
=== Studio albums ===
Title	Album details	Peak chart positions										Certifications
Title	Album details	AUS	AUT	CAN	GER	NED	NZ	NOR	SWE	UK	US	Certifications
The Boomtown Rats	Released: September 1977; Label: Ensign	—	—	—	—	—	—	—	—	18	—	UK: Silver
A Tonic for the Troops	Released: June 1978; Label: Ensign	95	—	—	—	—	25	—	—	8	112	UK: Platinum
The Fine Art of Surfacing	Released: October 1979; Label: Ensign	11	—	6	35	33	10	7	10	7	73	CAN: Platinum; UK: Gold
Mondo Bongo	Released: January 1981; Label: Mercury	24	19	22	16	—	50	17	5	6	116	UK: Gold
V Deep	Released: March 1982; Label: Mercury	—	—	37	—	—	—	27	—	64	103	
In the Long Grass	Released: May 1984; Label: Mercury	—	—	80	—	—	—	—	—	—	188	
Citizens of Boomtown	Released: March 2020; Label: BMG	—	73	—	41	—	—	—	—	48	—	
"—" denotes items that did not chart or were not released in that territory.

=== Live albums ===
Title	Album details
Live in the UK 2013, Dublin	Released: 2013; Label: Concert Live
Live in the UK 2013, London	Released: 2013; Label: Concert Live
Rewind Festival - Aug 17 2014	Released: 2014; Label: Concert Live
Live Germany 78	Released: 2016; Label: Let Them Eat Vinyl

=== Compilation albums ===
Title	Album details	Peak chart positions			Certifications
Title	Album details	IRE	SCO	UK	Certifications
Ratrospective	Released: 1983; Label: Columbia	—	—	—	
The Boomtown Rats' Greatest Hits	Released: 1987; Label: Columbia	—	—	—	
Loudmouth	Released: 27 June 1994; Label: Vertigo	—	33	10	
The Best of The Boomtown Rats	Released: 2003; Label: Universal	75	41	43	UK: Silver
20th Century Masters: The Best of The Boomtown Rats - Millennium Collection	Released: 2005; Label: Mercury	—	—	—	
Back to Boomtown: Classic Rats Hits	Released: 9 September 2013; Label: Virgin EMI	35	—	—	
So Modern – The Boomtown Rats Collection	Released: 2014; Label: Spectrum Audio	—	—	—	
Dawn of the Rats: B-Sides, Demos and Live 1975-1979	Released: 12 April 2025; Label: Universal	—	—	—	
"—" denotes items that did not chart or were not released in that territory.

=== EPs ===
Title	Album details
Ratlife: 1. "The Boomtown Rats" (5:14); 2. "Back to Boomtown (The Remix)" (4:05); 3. "Ratlife" (4:49); 4. "Ratified" (4:12)	Released: 21 October 2013; Label: Mercury

== Singles ==
Year	Title	Peak chart positions										Certifications	Album
Year	Title	IRE	AUS	CAN	GER	NED	NZ	NOR	SWE	UK	US	Certifications	Album
1977	"Lookin' After No. 1"	2	—	—	—	—	—	—	—	11	—		The Boomtown Rats
1977	"Mary of the 4th Form"	12	—	—	—	—	—	—	—	15	—		The Boomtown Rats
1978	"She's So Modern"	10	—	—	—	—	—	—	—	12	—		A Tonic for the Troops
1978	"Like Clockwork"	5	—	—	—	—	—	—	—	6	—	UK: Silver	A Tonic for the Troops
1978	"Rat Trap"	2	94	—	—	—	—	—	—	1	—	UK: Gold	A Tonic for the Troops
1979	"I Don't Like Mondays"	1	1	4	6	2	3	3	2	1	73	CAN: Gold; UK: Gold	The Fine Art of Surfacing
1979	"Diamond Smiles"	3	42	—	—	42	—	—	—	13	—		The Fine Art of Surfacing
1980	"Someone's Looking at You"	2	—	86	—	48	—	6	—	4	—		The Fine Art of Surfacing
1980	"Banana Republic"	3	18	47	3	35	—	3	7	3	—	UK: Silver	Mondo Bongo
1981	"The Elephants Graveyard (Guilty)"	7	—	—	—	—	—	—	—	26	—		Mondo Bongo
1981	"Go Man Go"	—	—	—	—	—	—	—	—	—	—		Mondo Bongo
1981	"Up All Night"	—	—	—	38	—	—	—	—	—	—		V Deep
1981	"Never in a Million Years"	—	—	—	—	—	—	—	—	62	—		V Deep
1982	"House on Fire"	19	—	—	67	—	—	—	—	24	—		V Deep
1982	"Charmed Lives"	—	—	—	—	—	—	—	—	—	—		V Deep
1984	"Tonight"	—	—	—	—	—	—	—	—	73	—		In the Long Grass
1984	"Drag Me Down"	—	—	—	—	—	—	—	—	50	—		In the Long Grass
1984	"Dave"	—	—	—	—	—	—	—	—	81	—		In the Long Grass
1985	"A Hold of Me"	—	—	—	—	—	—	—	—	78	—		In the Long Grass
1994	"I Don't Like Mondays" (re-issue)	—	—	—	—	—	—	—	—	38	—		Loudmouth
2020	"Trash Glam Baby"	—	—	—	—	—	—	—	—	—	—		Citizens of Boomtown
2020	"There's No Tomorrow Like Today"	—	—	—	—	—	—	—	—	—	—		Citizens of Boomtown
2020	"Here's a Postcard (Hot Mix)"	—	—	—	—	—	—	—	—	—	—		Citizens of Boomtown
"—" denotes items that did not chart or were not released in that territory.

== Videography ==
=== Video albums ===
Title	Album details
The Boomtown Rats on Film 1976–1986: Someone's Looking At You	Released: 7 February 2005; Label: Mercury; Formats: DVD
Live at Hammersmith Odeon 1978	Released: 8 March 2005; Label: Eagle Vision; Format: DVD
On a Night Like This	Released: 15 September 2008; Label: Cherry Red; Formats: DVD
Live in Germany '78 (DVD/CD)	Released: 8 June 2015; Label: Gonzo; Formats: DVD/CD

=== Music videos ===
Title	Year	Director(s)
"Rat Trap"	1978	David Mallet
"I Don't Like Mondays"	1979	David Mallet
"Diamond Smiles"	1979	David Mallet
"Up All Night"	1981	Unknown
"Never in a Million Years"	1982	David Mallet
"Drag Me Down"	1984	Nigel Dick
"Dave"	1984	Nigel Dick
"Tonight"	1984	Mike Brady
