= Back to Boomtown: Classic Rats Hits =

Greatest hits album by The Boomtown Rats
- Released: 9 September 2013
- Recorded: 1977–2013
- Genres: New wave, rock
- Length: 1:13:55
- Label: Virgin EMI
- Producers: Pete Briquette; Robert John "Mutt" Lange; Phil Wainman; Tony Visconti; Peter Walsh

The Boomtown Rats chronology
The Best of The Boomtown Rats (2003)	Back to Boomtown: Classic Rats Hits (2013)

Back to Boomtown: Classic Rats Hits is the fifth greatest hits album by Irish band The Boomtown Rats. It was released by Virgin EMI on 9 September 2013. The album was announced in June 2013 along with news of the band's UK and Ireland tour. Back to Boomtown: Classic Rats Hits is the first album to be released since The Boomtown Rats reunited and the band's first greatest hits album since 2003's The Best of The Boomtown Rats. The album contains fourteen of the group's singles, as well as two new tracks, "The Boomtown Rats" and "Back To Boomtown". The digital version of the album features two additional songs. Following its release, Back to Boomtown: Classic Rats Hits debuted at number thirty-five on the Irish Albums Chart.

== Background and development ==
In January 2013, it was announced that The Boomtown Rats, minus guitarist Gerry Cott and pianist Johnnie Fingers, had reformed following their split in 1986. The Guardian's Tim Jonze reported that the band would play a set at the Isle of Wight Festival, marking the first time they had played together since the split. The band's lead-singer Bob Geldof stated "Playing again with the Rats and doing those great songs again will be exciting afresh. We were an amazing band and I just feel it's the right time to re-Rat, to go back to Boomtown for a visit." In June 2013, it was announced that the band would be embarking on a UK and Ireland tour supported by a new "Best of" album called Back To Boomtown: Classic Rats Hits.

Tom Eames from Digital Spy revealed that the album would include fourteen of the band's singles as well as two new tracks. The digital version of the album features two additional songs, "House On Fire" and "Drag Me Down". During an interview with Zoë Ball on BBC Radio 2, Geldof explained that the record company had asked him to pen some new tracks and he wrote four in total; "The Boomtown Rats", "Back to Boomtown", "Ratified" and "Rat Life". The first two songs feature on Back To Boomtown: Classic Rats Hits. Geldof told Ball that the band would bring out the songs before the tour. He also confirmed that there would not be an album of new material as he did not think anyone would be interested.

The album's artwork was created by Kieran Fitzpatrick, with the art and design of the album handled by Oink Creative. The tracks were mastered at Abbey Road Studios by Geoff Pesche, with the exception of "The Boomtown Rats" and "Back To Boomtown", which were mastered at Metropolis Studios by Tony Cousins. Although originally scheduled to be released on 5 August 2013, Back to Boomtown: Classic Rats Hits was released in the UK on 9 September 2013.

== Reception ==
Terry Staunton from Record Collector gave the album three stars and commented "Thankfully, this compilation finds room for some of the band's more inspired album tracks, such as the curious Hitler tiff 'I Never Loved Eva Braun' and the archly witty 'Me And Howard Hughes'". Q magazine's Simon Price awarded the album four out of five stars. Price dismissed the album's artwork, calling it "unpromising" and likening it to "a cheap James Herbert paperback". He also called the new tracks "dreadful", but praised the rest of the album.

During the week ending 12 September 2013, Back to Boomtown: Classic Rats Hits debuted at number 35 on the Irish Albums Chart.

== Track listing ==
No.	Title	Writer(s)	Producer	Length
1.	"The Boomtown Rats"	Bob Geldof; Pete Briquette	Pete Briquette	5:11
2.	"Mary of the 4th Form"	Geldof	Lange	3:48
3.	"(I Never Loved) Eva Braun"	Geldof	Robert John "Mutt" Lange	4:37
4.	"Neon Heart"	Geldof	Lange	3:54
5.	"Like Clockwork"	Geldof; Briquette; Simon Crowe	Lange	3:44
6.	"She's So Modern"	Geldof; Johnnie Fingers	Lange	2:59
7.	"Lookin' After No. 1"	Geldof	Lange	3:08
8.	"Someone's Looking at You"	Geldof	Lange	4:25
9.	"Me and Howard Hughes"	Geldof	Lange	3:12
10.	"Joey's On the Streets Again"	Geldof	Lange	5:29
11.	"I Don't Like Mondays"	Geldof	Phil Wainman	4:19
12.	"Having My Picture Taken"	Geldof; Briquette	Lange	3:20
13.	"Banana Republic"	Geldof; Briquette	Tony Visconti	3:24
14.	"Diamond Smiles"	Geldof	Lange	3:51
15.	"Rat Trap"	Geldof	Lange	4:56
16.	"Back To Boomtown"	Geldof	Briquette	4:54

Back To Boomtown: Classic Rats Hits – Digital download edition
No.	Title	Writer(s)	Producer	Length
1.	"The Boomtown Rats"	Geldof; Briquette	Briquette	5:11
2.	"Mary Of The 4th Form"	Geldof	Lange	3:48
3.	"(I Never Loved) Eva Braun"	Geldof	Lange	4:37
4.	"Neon Heart"	Geldof	Lange	3:54
5.	"Like Clockwork"	Geldof; Briquette; Crowe	Lange	3:44
6.	"She's So Modern"	Geldof; Fingers	Lange	2:59
7.	"Lookin' After No. 1"	Geldof	Lange	3:08
8.	"Someone's Looking At You"	Geldof	Lange	4:25
9.	"Me and Howard Hughes"	Geldof	Lange	3:12
10.	"Joey's On the Streets Again"	Geldof	Lange	5:29
11.	"I Don't Like Mondays"	Geldof	Wainman	4:19
12.	"Having My Picture Taken"	Geldof; Briquette	Lange	3:20
13.	"Banana Republic"	Geldof; Briquette	Visconti	3:24
14.	"House on Fire"	Geldof	Visconti	4:45
15.	"Diamond Smiles"	Geldof	Lange	3:51
16.	"Drag Me Down"	Geldof	Peter Walsh	4:08
17.	"Rat Trap"	Geldof	Lange	4:56
18.	"Back To Boomtown"	Geldof	Briquette	4:54

== Charts ==
Chart (2013)	Peak position
Irish Albums (IRMA)	35
UK Albums (OCC)	105
