= A Tonic for the Troops =

Studio album by the Boomtown Rats
- Released: June 1978
- Recorded: 1978
- Studio: Relight (Netherlands)
- Genres: New wave, pop punk
- Labels: Ensign; Columbia; Mercury
- Producers: Robert John "Mutt" Lange; the Boomtown Rats

The Boomtown Rats chronology
The Boomtown Rats (1977)	A Tonic for the Troops (1978)	The Fine Art of Surfacing (1979)

A Tonic for the Troops is the second album by Irish rock band the Boomtown Rats, released in June 1978.

A Tonic for the Troops peaked at No. 8 on the UK Albums Chart in 1978. The album included the singles "She's So Modern", "Like Clockwork" and "Rat Trap". "She's So Modern" reached number 12 on the UK Singles Chart. The most commercially successful track on the album was "Rat Trap", which made it to Number 1 on the UK Singles Chart.

== Background ==
The album featured dark themes in an often upbeat, pop-punk style. One of the album's tracks, "(I Never Loved) Eva Braun", was described by one critic as "the happiest, cheeriest, best upbeat song about Hitler ever written." The lyrics of other songs discussed suicide ("Living in an Island") and euthanasia ("Can't Stop").

The album's title was taken from a line in "She's So Modern": "And Charlie ain't no Nazi/ she likes to wear her leather boots/ 'cuz it's exciting for the veterans/ and it's a tonic for the troops."

"Rat Trap" was the final cut on the UK version of the album but the opening track on the US version.

== Reception ==
Professional ratings
Review scores
Source	Rating
AllMusic	3/5 stars
Christgau's Record Guide	B+
The Irish Times	4/5 stars
Mojo	3/5 stars
The Rolling Stone Album Guide	3/5 stars
Uncut	4/5 stars

Rolling Stone critic Tom Carson described A Tonic for the Troops as "an inventive and melodically forceful piece of work, glossily ingratiating all the way", but also found the band "far too impressed by their own wit to be particularly incisive or convincing musically." Robert Christgau of The Village Voice was more positive, remarking that while the album "does turn rather campy at times... it will certainly do." He concluded: "I'll take a good calculating song about Adolf Hitler over an ordinary calculating song about the perils of romance any day, and if you're heading your music toward the rock mainstream, wit and flash don't hurt." The Globe and Mail noted that "A Tonic for the Troops isn't so much a rock and roll album as it is a hot scamper through a number of recently-molded styles, from Talking Heads to Elvis Costello."

== Track listing ==
All songs written by Bob Geldof except where indicated.

=== LP British version ===
Side 1

1. "Like Clockwork" (Bob Geldof, Pete Briquette, Simon Crowe)
2. "Blind Date"
3. "(I Never Loved) Eva Braun" (Note: Eva Braun (1912–1945) was Adolf Hitler's longtime companion and, during the 40 hours before they committed suicide together, his wife.)
4. "Living in an Island"
5. "Don't Believe What You Read"

Side 2

1. "She's So Modern" (Geldof, Johnnie Fingers)
2. "Me and Howard Hughes" (Note: Howard Hughes (1905–1976) was an American business magnate, investor, record-setting pilot, engineer, film director, and philanthropist, and in his later years a recluse.)
3. "Can't Stop"
4. "(Watch Out For) The Normal People"
5. "Rat Trap"

=== CD British version ===
1. "Like Clockwork" (Bob Geldof, Pete Briquette, Simon Crowe)
2. "Blind Date"
3. "(I Never Loved) Eva Braun"
4. "She's So Modern" (Geldof, Johnnie Fingers) (Track 6 – 1 on Side 2 – on the European version)
5. "Don't Believe What You Read"
6. "Living in an Island"
7. "Me and Howard Hughes"
8. "Can't Stop"
9. "(Watch Out For) The Normal People"
10. "Rat Trap"
11. "Lying Again" (CD bonus track)
12. "How Do You Do?" (CD bonus track)
13. "So Strange" (CD bonus track)

=== American LP version ===
Side 1

1. "Rat Trap"
2. "Me and Howard Hughes"
3. "(I Never Loved) Eva Braun"
4. "Living in an Island"
5. "Like Clockwork" (Geldof, Briquette, Crowe)

Side 2

1. "Blind Date"
2. "Mary of the 4th Form" (a re-recorded version of the original found on their first LP The Boomtown Rats)
3. "Don't Believe What You Read"
4. "She's So Modern" (Geldof, Fingers)
5. "Joey's on the Street Again" (from The Boomtown Rats)

== Personnel ==
Credits adapted from album liner notes and AllMusic.

The Boomtown Rats

- Bob Geldof – vocals, saxophone
- Pete Briquette – bass, vocals
- Gerry Cott – guitar
- Johnnie Fingers – keyboards, vocals
- Simon Crowe – drums, vocals
- Garry Roberts – guitar, vocals

Additional musicians

- Alan Holmes – saxophone

Technical

- The Boomtown Rats – production
- Stuff Brown – engineering
- Fin Costello – photography
- Chalkie Davies – photography
- Tim Friese-Greene – engineering
- Hothouse – artwork, design
- Chuck Loyola – painting
- Robert John "Mutt" Lange – production

== Charts ==
Chart (1978–79)	Peak position
Australian Albums (Kent Music Report)	95
New Zealand Albums (RMNZ)	25
UK Albums (Official Charts)	8
US Billboard 200	112

== Certifications ==
Region	Certification	Certified units/sales
United Kingdom (BPI)	Platinum	300,000^{^}
^{^} Shipments figures based on certification alone.
