= The Boomtown Rats' Greatest Hits =

The Boomtown Rats Greatest Hits

Greatest hits album by The Boomtown Rats
- Released: 1987
- Recorded: 1978–1985
- Genre: New wave
- Length: 43:40
- Label: Columbia

Professional ratings
Review scores
Source	Rating
Allmusic	4/5 stars
Christgau's Record Guide	B−

The Boomtown Rats' Greatest Hits is a compilation album of The Boomtown Rats' singles on Columbia Records from 1979 to 1985.

== Track listing ==
All songs were written by Bob Geldof, except where noted.

1. "I Don't Like Mondays" – 4:17
2. "Rat Trap" – 5:08
3. "She's So Modern" (Johnny Fingers, Geldof) – 2:57
4. "Banana Republic" (Pete Briquette, Geldof) – 4:57
5. "Skin on Skin" (Briquette, Geldof) – 4:37
6. "Up All Night" – 3:34
7. "Joey's on the Street Again" – 5:51
8. "The Elephants' Graveyard (Guilty)" – 3:43
9. "House on Fire" – 4:43
10. "Never in a Million Years" – 3:49
