= Ratrospective =

Compilation album by The Boomtown Rats
- Released: 1983
- Genre: Rock
- Label: Columbia Records

The Boomtown Rats chronology
| V Deep (1982) | Ratrospective (1983) | In the Long Grass (1984) |

Ratrospective is a 1983 EP by The Boomtown Rats. It was designed as a compilation of the singles that had been released to the US market and was released on the Columbia Records label.

== Track listing ==
1. "Never in a Million Years" - (Geldof) - 3:49
2. "I Don't Like Mondays" - (Geldof) - 4:18
3. "Joey's on the Street Again" - (Geldof) - 5:51
4. "Rat Trap" - (Geldof) - 5:08
5. "She's So Modern" - (Fingers, Geldof) - 2:55
6. "Up All Night" - (Geldof) - 3:34
