= The Boomtown Rats (album) =

Studio album by the Boomtown Rats
- Released: September 1977
- Studio: Dierks (Stommeln)
- Genres: Pop punk, punk rock
- Labels: Ensign; Mercury
- Producer: Robert John "Mutt" Lange

The Boomtown Rats chronology
The Boomtown Rats (1977)	A Tonic for the Troops (1978)

Professional ratings
Review scores
Source	Rating
AllMusic	3/5 stars
Christgau's Record Guide	B+
The Irish Times	3/5 stars
The Rolling Stone Album Guide	3/5 stars

The Boomtown Rats is the debut album by Irish rock band the Boomtown Rats, released in September 1977. It included the Rats' first hit single, "Lookin' After No. 1", as well as the subsequent single, "Mary of the 4th Form". The album peaked at No. 18 in the UK Albums Chart in 1977.

== Track listings ==
=== 1977 LP ===
All lyrics written by Bob Geldof, all music arranged by the Boomtown Rats

1. "Lookin' After No. 1"
2. "Neon Heart"
3. "Joey's on the Street Again"
4. "Never Bite the Hand That Feeds"
5. "Mary of the 4th Form"
6. "(She's Gonna) Do You In"
7. "Close As You'll Ever Be"
8. "I Can Make It If You Can"
9. "Kicks"

=== 2005 CD reissue ===
1. "Lookin' After No. 1"
2. "Mary of the 4th Form"
3. "Close As You'll Ever Be"
4. "Neon Heart"
5. "Joey's On the Streets Again"
6. "I Can Make It If You Can"
7. "Never Bite the Hand That Feeds"
8. "(She's Gonna) Do You In"
9. "Kicks"

Bonus tracks

10. "Doin' It Right" – 1975 live demo
11. "My Blues Away" – 1975 live demo
12. "A Second Time" – 1975 live demo
13. "Fanzine Hero" – 1975 live demo
14. "Barefootin'" – Live at Moran's Hotel, Dublin, 1975
15. "Mary of the 4th Form" – single version

== Personnel ==
Credits adapted from album liner notes.

The Boomtown Rats

- Bob Geldof – lead vocals, harmonica
- Garry Roberts – guitar, backing vocals
- Gerry Cott – guitar
- Johnnie Fingers – keyboards, backing vocals
- Pete Briquette – bass, backing vocals
- Simon Crowe – drums, backing vocals

Additional musicians

- Albie Donnelly – saxophone

Technical

- Adrian Boot – photography
- Steve Brown – editing, engineering, mastering, mixing
- Sue Dubois – art direction, design
- Geoff Halpin – design
- Robert John "Mutt" Lange – mixing, production
- Hannah Sharn – photography

== Charts ==
Chart (1977)	Peak position
UK Albums (Official Charts)	18

== Certifications ==
Region	Certification	Certified units/sales
United Kingdom (BPI)	Silver	60,000^{^}
^{^} Shipments figures based on certification alone.
