= Mondo Bongo =

Studio album by the Boomtown Rats
- Released: December 1980 (UK); February 1981 (US)
- Studio: Ibiza Sound Studios, Ibiza, Spain
- Genre: Rock, new wave
- Label: Mercury (UK); Columbia (US)
- Producer: Tony Visconti, the Boomtown Rats

The Boomtown Rats chronology
The Fine Art of Surfacing (1979)	Mondo Bongo (1980)	V Deep (1982)

Singles from Mondo Bongo
- 1. "Banana Republic" Released: 1980; 2. "The Elephants Graveyard" Released: 1981; 3. "Go Man Go" Released: 1981

Professional ratings
Review scores
Source	Rating
AllMusic	2/5 stars
Rolling Stone	4/5 stars

Mondo Bongo was the Boomtown Rats' fourth album. It peaked at No. 6 in the UK Albums Chart in February 1981, and No. 116 in the US Billboard 200. This is the band's last album to be recorded as six-piece band, as the guitarist Gerry Cott left the band shortly after the album's release.

It included the hit singles: "Banana Republic", which had reached No. 3 in the UK Singles Chart in November 1980 and "The Elephants Graveyard (Guilty)" which made No. 26 in January 1981.

== Reception ==
The album received mixed reviews in the press, with American critics being generally more positive than their British counterparts. New Musical Express put down the record as "hollow pop, quaking under a plethora of poorly integrated rip-offs", while Sounds called it "self-indulgent" and lacking in depth or emotion. Rolling Stone, however, praised it as "an intoxicating mixture of pop and punk", and Trouser Press called it "an enormously enjoyable LP, with hardly a dry patch on it".

== Track listing ==
All songs were written by Bob Geldof, except where noted.

1. "Mood Mambo" (Geldof, Pete Briquette) – 4:06
2. "Straight Up" – 3:15
3. "This is My Room" (Geldof, Simon Crowe) – 3:35
4. "Another Piece of Red" – 2:35
5. "Go Man Go!" – 3:52
6. "Under Their Thumb is Under My Thumb" (music: Mick Jagger, Keith Richards; new lyrics: Geldof) – 2:41
7. "Please Don't Go" – 3:34
8. "The Elephants Graveyard" – 3:43
9. "Banana Republic" (Geldof, Briquette) – 4:55
10. "Fall Down" – 2:26
11. "Hurt Hurts" – 3:05
12. "Whitehall 1212" – 3:43
13. "Cheerio" – 1:24 (hidden track)

The North American releases replaced "Fall Down" with "Don't Talk to Me" (2:50) and "Whitehall 1212" with "Up All Night" (3:33). The Canadian cassette release added "Whitehall 1212" as a bonus track at the end of Side 1, after "Under Their Thumb."

=== 2005 re-issue ===
1. "Straight Up" – 3:15
2. "The Elephants Graveyard" – 3:43
3. "This is My Room" – 3:35
4. "Another Piece of Red" – 2:35
5. "Hurt Hurts" – 3:05
6. "Please Don't Go" – 3:34
7. "Fall Down" – 2:26
8. "Go Man Go!" – 3:52
9. "Under Their Thumb" – 2:41
10. "Banana Republic" – 4:55
11. "Whitehall 1212" – 3:43
12. "Mood Mambo" – 4:06
13. "Cheerio" – 1:15
14. "Don't Talk to Me" (B-side) – 2:53
15. "Arnold Layne" (Recorded for TV) (Syd Barrett) – 3:11
16. "Another Piece of Red" (Live in Portsmouth) – 3:33

This reissue caused some controversy amongst fans for not only mixing up the track order from the original LP, but for cutting out the short period of silence in the middle of "Cheerio" that was placed there to allow the listener to say something, as per the lyrics.

== Personnel ==
The Boomtown Rats

- Bob Geldof - lead and backing vocals
- Johnnie Fingers - keyboards, backing vocals
- Gerry Cott - guitar
- Garry Roberts - guitar, backing vocals
- Pete Briquette - bass, keyboards, backing vocals
- Simon Crowe - drums, backing vocals

Additional musicians

- Dr. Dave McHale - saxophone
- T.V. - backing vocals, recorder, occasional drunken bass, guitar
- Tom Winter - bazouki on "Please Don't Go"
- Andy Duncan - percussion on "Please Don't Go"

Technical

- Chris Porter, Tom Winter - engineer
- Mike Owen - photography

== Charts ==
Chart	Position
Australia (Kent Music Report)	24
Canadian Albums Chart	22
UK Albums Chart	6
United States Billboard 200	116
