= Citizens of Boomtown =

Studio album by the Boomtown Rats
- Released: 13 March 2020
- Studio: Brick Music, Acton, London; Barnstorm Studios
- Genre: Rock
- Length: 41:13
- Label: BMG
- Producer: Pete Briquette

The Boomtown Rats chronology
In the Long Grass (1984)	Citizens of Boomtown (2020)

Citizens of Boomtown is the seventh studio album by Irish band the Boomtown Rats, released on 13 March 2020 via BMG. It is the band's first album since 1984's In the Long Grass, and the first album to be recorded as four-piece band, as the keyboardist Johnnie Fingers did not return when the band was reunited in 2013. It is also the last album to feature longtime guitarist Garry Roberts, who died on November 8, 2022.

== Critical reception ==
Professional ratings
Aggregate scores
Source	Rating
Metacritic	58/100
Review scores
Source	Rating
AllMusic	2.5/5 stars
The Guardian	3/5 stars
The Irish Times	3/5 stars
Louder Than War	8/10

Citizens of Boomtown was met with mixed reviews from critics. At Metacritic, which assigns a weighted average rating out of 100 to reviews from mainstream publications, this release received an average score of 58, based on six reviews. Thomas H. Green of The Arts Desk rated the album 3 out of 5 stars.

== Track listing ==
All tracks composed by Bob Geldof; except where indicated

1. "Trash Glam Baby" – 3:52
2. "Sweet Thing" – 3:10
3. "Monster Monkeys" (Geldof, Pete Briquette) – 4:25
4. "She Said No" – 3:55
5. "Passing Through" (Geldof, Pete Briquette) – 4:35
6. "Here's a Postcard" – 3:52
7. "K.I.S.S." (Geldof, Pete Briquette) – 3:10
8. "Rock 'n' Roll Yé Yé" (Geldof, Darren Beale) – 4:54
9. "Get a Grip" (Geldof, Pete Briquette) – 4:00
10. "The Boomtown Rats" (Geldof, Pete Briquette) – 5:20

== Personnel ==
The Boomtown Rats

- Bob Geldof - vocals, guitar, harmonica
- Garry Roberts - guitar
- Pete Briquette - bass guitar, keyboards, drum programming
- Simon Crowe - drums, vocals

with:

- Darren Beale - lead guitar, Moog, backing vocals
- Paul Cuddeford - guitar on "Passing Through"
- Alan Dunn - keyboards, backing vocals
- Luciano Cusack, Serafina Cusack - backing vocals

Technical

- Pete Briquette, Rob Barrie - recording
- Clemens Gritl - artwork
- Sagan Cowne - sleeve, design

== Charts ==
Sales chart performance for Citizens of Boomtown
Chart (2020)	Peak position
Austrian Albums (Ö3 Austria)	73
German Albums (Offizielle Top 100)	41
Irish Albums (OCC)	12
Scottish Albums (OCC)	11
UK Albums (OCC)	48

== See also ==
- List of 2020 albums
