= In the Long Grass =

Studio album by the Boomtown Rats
- Released: May 1984
- Studio: Right Track, New York City
- Genre: Rock, pop rock
- Label: Mercury (UK); Columbia (US)
- Producer: Pete Walsh, the Boomtown Rats; James Guthrie on "Tonight"

The Boomtown Rats chronology
V Deep (1982)	In the Long Grass (1984)	Citizens of Boomtown (2020)

Singles from In the Long Grass
- 1. "Tonight" Released: 1984; 2. "Drag Me Down" Released: 1984; 3. "Dave" Released: 1984; 4. "A Hold of Me" Released: 1985

Professional ratings
Review scores
Source	Rating
Allmusic	3/5 stars
Number One	3/5 stars

In the Long Grass is the sixth studio album by the Boomtown Rats, released in 1984 in the UK and 1985 in the US. It was the band's last studio material for well over three decades until 2020's Citizens of Boomtown, and the last album to feature keyboardist Johnnie Fingers, as he didn't return when the band was reunited in 2013, and the last to be released by them as a five-piece band.

The Boomtown Rats' least commercially favourable effort, it failed to appear altogether in the UK Albums Chart, but did reach No. 188 in the US Billboard 200. In a 2025 interview, Geldof described himself as being 'anxious' on the day that he saw the BBC news report on the Ethiopian famine which inspired the Band Aid project because he was unsatisfied with the quality and lack of commercial success of In the Long Grass.

== Track listing ==
All songs written by Bob Geldof except where indicated.

1. "A Hold of Me" – 4:57
2. "Drag Me Down" – 4:31
3. "Dave" – 4:19
4. "Over Again" – 3:45
5. "Another Sad Story" (Johnny Fingers) – 3:42
6. "Tonight" – 3:53
7. "Hard Times" – 3:54
8. "Lucky" (J. Fingers) – 3:37
9. "An Icicle in the Sun" – 3:50
10. "Up or Down" (Simon Crowe, Pete Briquette) – 3:33

== 1985 US listing ==
For the US, the record company insisted that the track "Dave" needed to be reworked before it could be released in that country. Geldof had written "Dave" for Dave MacHale, an Irish saxophonist and keyboard player, after his girlfriend died of a heroin overdose in 1983. New lyrics were written and sung over the same backing track; the new track was called "Rain".
All songs written by Bob Geldof except where indicated.

1. "A Hold of Me"
2. "Drag Me Down"
3. "Rain"
4. "Over Again"
5. "Another Sad Story" (J. Fingers)
6. "Tonight"
7. "Hard Times"
8. "Lucky" (J. Fingers)
9. "An Icicle in the Sun"
10. "Up or Down" (S. Crowe, P. Briquette)

== 2005 bonus tracks ==
1. "Dave" (Single Version)
2. "Walking Downtown" (B. Geldof, P. Briquette) (B-side)
3. "Precious Time" (S. Crowe) (B-side)
4. "She's Not the Best" (Home Demo)

== Personnel ==
The Boomtown Rats

- Bob Geldof – vocals
- Pete Briquette – bass, vocals
- Johnnie Fingers – keyboards, vocals
- Simon Crowe – drums, vocals
- Garry Roberts – guitar, vocals

Additional personnel

- Peter Thoms – trombone (credited on the sleeve as Pete "Gidday" Thomas)
- Luke Tunney – trumpet
- Guy Barker – trumpet
- Gary Barnacle – saxophone
- Martin Dobson – saxophone
- Peter Claridge – guitar
- Molly and Polly – backing vocals on "Hard Times"
- Ian Ritchie – saxophone
- Bob Carter – arrangement on "Tonight"

Technical

- Martin Rex – engineer
- Bob Clearmountain – mixing
- Ashworth – photography
