= Lookin' After No. 1 =

Single by The Boomtown Rats

from the album The Boomtown Rats
- B-side: "Born to Burn" and "Barefootin" (live)
- Released: 19 August 1977
- Genre: Punk rock; new wave
- Length: 3:10
- Label: Ensign Records (UK); Mercury Records (US)
- Songwriter(s): Bob Geldof (and Robert Parker for "Barefootin'")

The Boomtown Rats singles chronology
"Lookin' After No. 1" (1977)	"Mary of the 4th Form" (1977)

Audio
- "Lookin' After No. 1" on YouTube

"Lookin' After No. 1" is the first single by the Boomtown Rats, from their self-titled debut album. The single was released in August 1977 after the band had performed a five-date tour supporting Tom Petty and the Heartbreakers. "Lookin' After No. 1" was the first new wave single to be playlisted by the BBC and the Boomtown Rats subsequently became the first new wave band to be offered an appearance on Top of the Pops, performing the song. The song reached number 2 on the Irish Singles Chart and spent nine weeks on the UK Singles Chart reaching a peak of number 11. Different covers were produced for releases in the Netherlands and Japan. Reviewer David Clancy described the song as having a "breakneck sneering selfishness".

The single was the first of ten consecutive single releases by the Boomtown Rats to reach the top 40 in the UK.

Before the band's break-up in 1986, they played "Lookin' After No. 1" as the last song of their final performance, part of the Self Aid Irish fundraiser.

== Personnel ==
- Bob Geldof – vocals, saxophone
- Pete Briquette – bass guitar, vocals
- Gerry Cott – guitar
- Johnnie Fingers – keyboards, vocals
- Simon Crowe – drums, vocals
- Garry Roberts – guitar, vocals
