= V Deep =

Studio album by the Boomtown Rats
- Released: March 1982
- Recorded: 1981–1982
- Studio: Ibiza Sound Studios, Ibiza, Spain
- Genre: Rock, pop rock
- Length: 41:02
- Label: WEA (Ireland); Ensign (UK); Columbia (US)
- Producer: Tony Visconti, the Boomtown Rats

The Boomtown Rats chronology
Mondo Bongo (1981)	V Deep (1982)	In the Long Grass (1984)

Singles from V Deep
- 1. "Up All Night" Released: 1981; 2. "Never in a Million Years" Released: 1981; 3. "House on Fire" Released: 1982; 4. "Charmed Lives" Released: 1982

Professional ratings
Review scores
Source	Rating
Allmusic	2/5 stars

V Deep is the Boomtown Rats's fifth album, and the first to be released as a five-piece band, following the departure of guitarist Gerry Cott. It includes the minor hit single "House on Fire".

== Name ==
The name of the album is pronounced "five deep", not "vee deep" referring to the roman numeral 5. It refers to the fact that it is the band's fifth album and also that they became a five-piece following the departure of Gerry Cott.

== Track listing ==
=== UK release ===
All songs were written by Bob Geldof, except where noted.

1. "Never in a Million Years"
2. "The Bitter End"
3. "Talking in Code"
4. "He Watches It All"
5. "A Storm Breaks"
6. "Charmed Lives"
7. "House on Fire"
8. "Up All Night"
9. "Skin on Skin"
10. "The Little Death/... House Burned Down" (Geldof, Pete Briquette)

=== US release ===
All songs were written by Bob Geldof, except where noted.

1. "Never in a Million Years"
2. "The Bitter End"
3. "Talking in Code"
4. "He Watches It All"
5. "A Storm Breaks"
6. "Charmed Lives"
7. "House on Fire"
8. "Whitehall 1212" (from the UK Mondo Bongo)
9. "Skin on Skin"
10. "The Little Death/... House Burned Down" (Geldof, Pete Briquette)

=== 2005 reissue ===
All songs were written by Bob Geldof, except where noted.

1. "He Watches It All"
2. "Never in a Million Years"
3. "Talking in Code"
4. "The Bitter End"
5. "The Little Death" (Geldof, Pete Briquette)
6. "A Storm Breaks"
7. "Up All Night"
8. "House on Fire"
9. "Charmed Lives"
10. "Skin on Skin"
11. "Say Hi to Mick"
12. "No Hiding Place" (B-side)
13. "House on Fire" (12" Dub Version)
14. "Up All Night" (Long Version)

== Personnel ==
The Boomtown Rats

- Bob Geldof – vocals, saxophone
- Pete Briquette – bass, vocals
- Johnnie Fingers – keyboards, vocals
- Simon Crowe – drums, vocals
- Garry Roberts – guitar, vocals

with:

- Andy Duncan – percussion
- Andy Hamilton, Dave McHale – saxophone
- Guy Barker – trumpet
- Spike Edney – trombone

Technical

- Andy Le Vien, Corinne Simcock – engineer
- Gordon Fordyce – remixing
- Ben Kelly – cover, design
- Jon Prew – photography
