= Mary of the 4th Form =

Single by The Boomtown Rats

from the album The Boomtown Rats
- B-side: "Do the Rat"
- Released: 11 November 1977
- Genre: Punk rock; new wave; glam rock
- Length: 3:52 (album version 3:33)
- Label: Ensign
- Songwriters: Bob Geldof; Johnnie Fingers
- Producer: Robert John "Mutt" Lange

The Boomtown Rats singles chronology
"Lookin' After No. 1" (1977)	"Mary of the 4th Form" (1977)	"She's So Modern" (1978)

"Mary of the 4th Form" is the second single by the Boomtown Rats. It was the first song released from the band's debut studio album, The Boomtown Rats (1977), though the single version is a re-recording different from the album track and 19 seconds longer. On French and Dutch releases, the single's A-side was "Do the Rat", which was the B-side of the UK version. The song's theme, concerning a teacher's sexual attraction to a teenage girl who acts in a sexually provocative manner, resonated in the Police song "Don't Stand So Close to Me".

"Mary of the 4th Form" peaked at No. 15 in the UK singles chart in 1977.

== Personnel ==
- Bob Geldof – vocals
- Pete Briquette – bass, vocals
- Gerry Cott – guitar
- Johnnie Fingers – keyboards, vocals
- Simon Crowe – drums, vocals
- Garry Roberts – guitar, vocals
