= Do They Know It's Christmas? =

1984 charity song by Band Aid

- Cover artwork by Peter Blake

Single by Band Aid
- B-side: "Feed the World" (1984); "One Year On (Feed the World)" (1985)
- Released: 7 December 1984
- Recorded: 25–26 November 1984
- Studio: Sarm West Studios, London
- Genre: Christmas; synth-pop
- Length: 3:55 (7-inch version); 6:20 (12-inch version)
- Label: Phonogram (UK); Columbia (US)
- Songwriters: Bob Geldof; Midge Ure
- Producer: Midge Ure

Music video
- "Do They Know It's Christmas?" on YouTube

"Do They Know It's Christmas?" is a charity song written in 1984 by Bob Geldof and Midge Ure to raise money for the 1983–1985 famine in Ethiopia. It was first recorded by Band Aid, a supergroup consisting of popular British and Irish musicians, in a single day at Sarm West Studios in Notting Hill, London, in November 1984.

"Do They Know It's Christmas?" was released in the UK on 7 December 1984. It entered the UK singles chart at number one, where it remained for five weeks, becoming Christmas number one. It sold a million copies in the first week, making it the fastest-selling single in UK chart history until Elton John's "Candle in the Wind 1997". UK sales passed three million by 1985. The song also reached number one in 13 other countries. In the US, it reached number 13 on the Billboard Hot 100, and sold an estimated 2.5 million copies by 1985. It had sold 11.7 million copies worldwide by 1989 and 3.8 million in the UK by 2017.

"Do They Know It's Christmas?" raised £8 million for Ethiopia within a year, far exceeding Geldof's hopes. The success inspired other charity singles, such as "We Are the World" (1985) by USA for Africa, and charity events such as Comic Relief and the 1985 Live Aid concert. Some commentators argued that the lyrics were racist or demeaning towards Ethiopians and misrepresented Africa, or that the song hindered more meaningful solutions to poverty. Geldof defended the lyrics as factual and Ure said the song was secondary to the purpose of raising money for the cause.

"Do They Know It's Christmas?" was rerecorded and rereleased with different musicians in 1989, 2004 and 2014. The 1989 and 2004 versions also raised funds for famine relief, while the 2014 version raised funds for the Ebola crisis in West Africa. All three reached number one in the UK, and the 1989 and 2004 versions were Christmas number ones. The 2004 version sold 1.8 million copies. A new mix, combining elements of the previous versions, was released in 2024 for the 40th anniversary.

== Background ==
"Do They Know It's Christmas?" was inspired by a series of reports made by the BBC journalist Michael Buerk in 1984, which drew attention to the famine in Ethiopia. The BBC News crew were the first to document the famine, with Buerk's report on 23 October describing it as "a biblical famine in the 20th century" and "the closest thing to hell on Earth". The report featured the nurse Claire Bertschinger, who had to choose which children would receive the limited amount of food and who were too sick to be saved. The reports shocked the UK, motivating the British people to inundate relief agencies, such as Save the Children, with donations. The Boomtown Rats singer Bob Geldof and his partner, the television presenter Paula Yates, were deeply affected by the broadcast. Geldof said about Bertschinger: "In her was vested the power of life and death. She had become godlike, and that is unbearable for anyone."

On 2 November, Yates was in the Tyne Tees studio in Newcastle upon Tyne, where she was presenting the weekly live music show The Tube. Among the acts performing were Ultravox, promoting their greatest hits album The Collection. The singer, Midge Ure, was chatting to Yates in the dressing room when Geldof called her. Geldof had worked with Ure at the 1981 charity benefit show The Secret Policeman's Ball. Geldof asked to speak to Ure and told him that he wanted to do something to alleviate the suffering in Ethiopia. He and Ure arranged to discuss ideas over lunch on 5 November, and decided to make a charity record.

== Composition ==
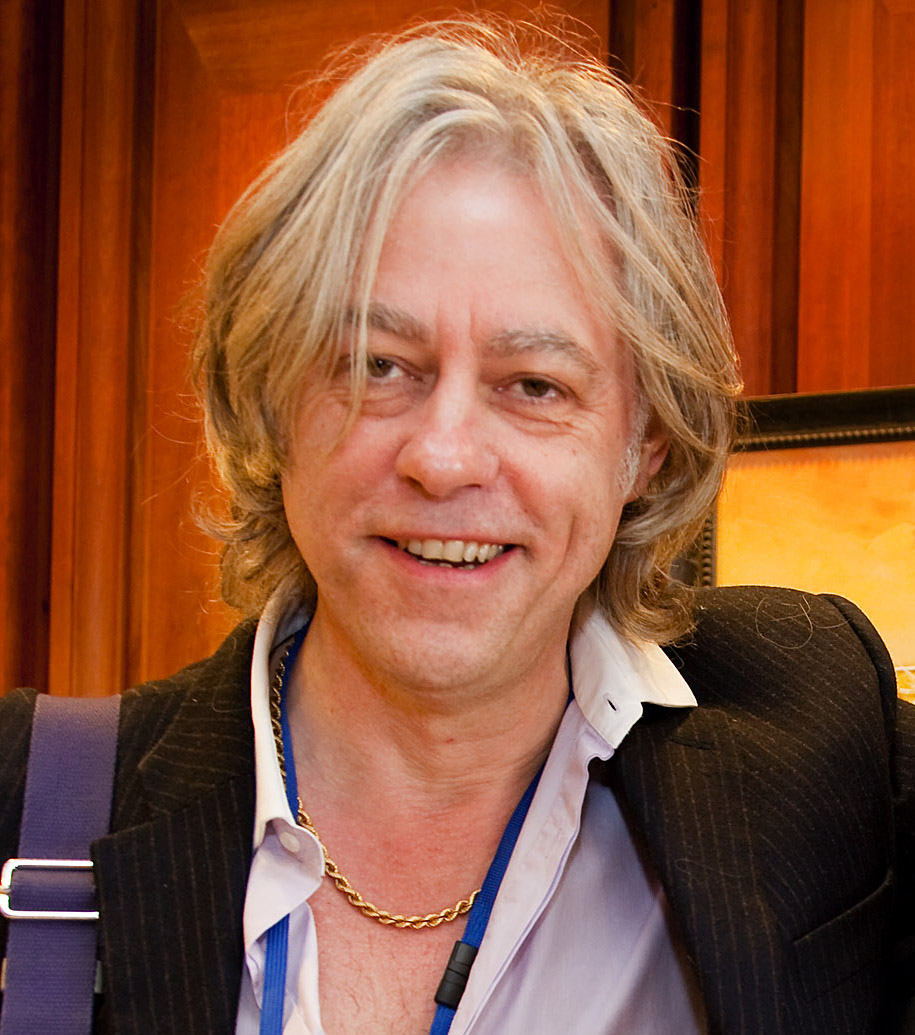
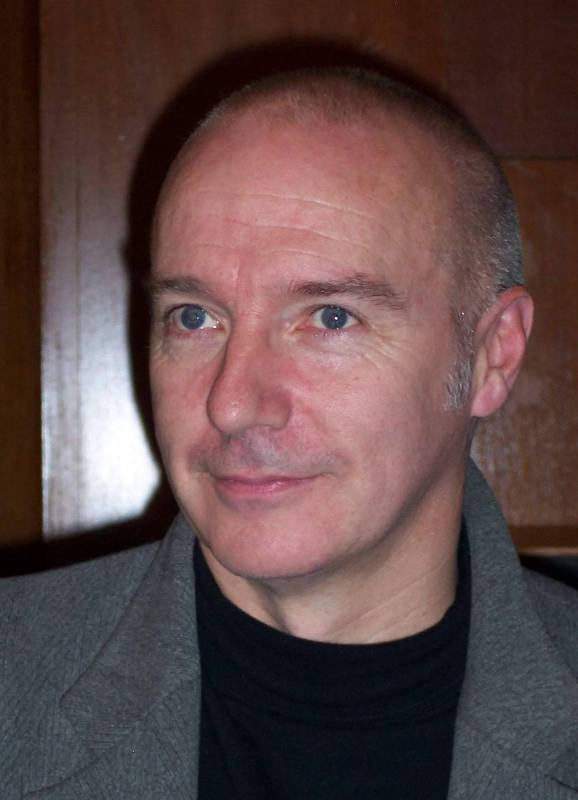
"Do They Know It's Christmas" was written by Bob Geldof (left) and Midge Ure (right) and produced by Ure.

Geldof's and Ure's biggest challenge was to write a song that could be recorded and released in time for Christmas. To avoid having to pay royalties, which would diminish the amount raised for charity, they wrote an original song rather than record a cover version. Ure wrote what he felt was a Christmas-like melody on a portable keyboard. He sent a tape to Geldof, who sarcastically told him that it sounded like the theme to the television series Z-Cars.

Geldof came to Ure's house the next day and they worked on the song with Geldof on acoustic guitar. Geldof added lyrics based on a song he had originally written for the Boomtown Rats, which he had provisionally titled "It's My World". Ure recorded Geldof and his guitar and developed Geldof's ideas in his home studio, adding his own melody as a chorus. Ure was unable to improve on Geldof's lyrics, although he changed the line "And there won't be snow in Ethiopia this Christmas time" to "And there won't be snow in Africa this Christmas time", as Ure decided "Ethiopia" had too many syllables.

Geldof asked Trevor Horn to produce the song. Horn was an in-demand producer, having produced three number-one singles that year for Frankie Goes to Hollywood. He was receptive but said he would need at least six weeks, which would make it impossible to release by Christmas. However, he allowed the team to use his studios, Sarm West Studios in Notting Hill, London, free for 24 hours on 25 November. Horn later remixed and co-produced the 12" version and remixed it for the 1985 rerelease.

"Do They Know It's Christmas?" comprises a verse and bridge, which allow individual singers to perform different lines, and a chorus in the form of two repeated phrases performed by ensemble. The first line is sung by Paul Young on the 1984 version, Kylie Minogue on the 1989 version, Chris Martin of Coldplay on the 2004 version, and One Direction on the 2014 version. The opening line was sung by David Bowie at the Live Aid concert in 1985.

== Artists ==
While Ure was creating the backing track, Geldof contacted various artists, hoping to have the biggest names in British and Irish music appear. Geldof recruited Spandau Ballet after a chance meeting with the guitarist, Gary Kemp, at an antiques shop in London. Geldof said: "It suddenly hit me. I thought, 'Christ, we have got the real top boys here.' All the big names in pop are suddenly ready and willing to do this... I knew then that we were off, and I just decided to go for all the rest of the faces and started to ring everyone up, asking them to do it."

Members of the American funk group Kool & the Gang appeared because they were signed to the same record label as the Boomtown Rats, and happened to be visiting Phonogram's London offices on the day that Geldof proposed the single. Geldof invited Francis Rossi and Rick Parfitt of the band Status Quo to take part. Although Status Quo were from a different musical background and era, he felt their fame and consistent success would add credibility and their large fanbase would add to the sales.

Geldof called Boy George, at the time one of the biggest music stars in the world, repeatedly in New York the day before the recording to insist that he attend. George took the last Concorde flight of the day and arrived at the studio at 6 pm. He went immediately into the recording booth to deliver his lines, the last solo artist of the day. Marilyn, who had achieved hit singles in 1983 but whose career had declined in 1984, arrived at the recording session uninvited, sensing an opportunity for publicity. Geldof and Ure felt any publicity was good and accepted him. Further phone calls from Geldof secured promises from all the musicians to contribute without payment.

Those who were unable to appear, such as David Bowie and Paul McCartney, sent recorded messages of support that appeared on the B-side. The Thompson Twins, who were out of the country instead donated part of the proceeds of their single "Lay Your Hands on Me" to the Action for Ethiopia charity. Geldof said only three people refused to be involved, but refused to disclose who. Other contributors included UK music magazines, which donated advertising space to promote the single; Geldof's record label, Phonogram, which released the single; their parent company, PolyGram, which distributed it; and the artist Peter Blake, who created the sleeve.

== Recording ==
"Do They Know It's Christmas?" was produced by Ure. He spent several days in his home studio with his engineer, Rik Walton, creating the backing track, programming the keyboards and drum machines. For the intro, he used a sample of the drums from the 1983 track "The Hurting" by Tears for Fears. John Taylor of Duran Duran and Paul Weller visited Ure's studio the day before the recording to add bass guitar and lead guitar. Ure and Weller later agreed that the guitar did not fit and did not use it. Ure sang the guide vocal, and Sting and Simon Le Bon of Duran Duran recorded their parts in Ure's studio.

Geldof and Ure arrived at Sarm West Studios at around 8 am on 25 November with the media in attendance outside. With recording scheduled to begin at 10:30 am, the artists began arriving. Geldof gave the newspaper The Daily Mirror exclusive access in the studio, and had a group photograph taken by the newspaper's photographer Brian Aris before recording, knowing it would appear in the following day's edition and create publicity. The actor Nigel Planer, who had reached number two earlier in the year with a cover version of "Hole in My Shoe" in the guise of his character Neil from the sitcom The Young Ones, also arrived uninvited. He performed in character as Neil to the camera.

Ure played the backing track and guide vocals to the artists. As a way of having everyone involved immediately, he recorded the climax first. The artists were put in a group and sang the refrain "Feed the world, let them know it's Christmas time again" until it was complete. Ure chose Tony Hadley of Spandau Ballet to be the first singer to record his solo part. Hadley said this was nerve-racking, knowing that his contemporaries were watching him. Ure recorded each singer one by one and made notes on which segments would be used. Le Bon, despite having already recorded his part at Ure's house, re-recorded it so he could be part of the moment. Sting also rerecorded his lyrics to provide harmony vocals. Geldof and Ure took part in the "feed the world" finale, but did not sing any solo lines. Ure wrote in his autobiography that he was constantly battling with Geldof, and telling him to leave when he would come into the production booth and wrongly tell artists what to sing.

Ure planned Rossi and Parfitt to sing the "here's to you" harmonies in the bridge, but Parfitt could not reach the high notes, and so the part was sung by Weller, Sting and Glenn Gregory. Rossi privately told Ure afterwards that he sang most of Status Quo's vocal parts and that Parfitt only usually sang onstage, and that Ure should have kept Parfitt away from the microphone. Parfitt said later that he and Rossi had been hungover, and were in no fit state to attempt to record their vocals. According to Robin Eggar, the only journalist present throughout the recording, Rossi and Parfitt supplied cocaine and the session "became a party".

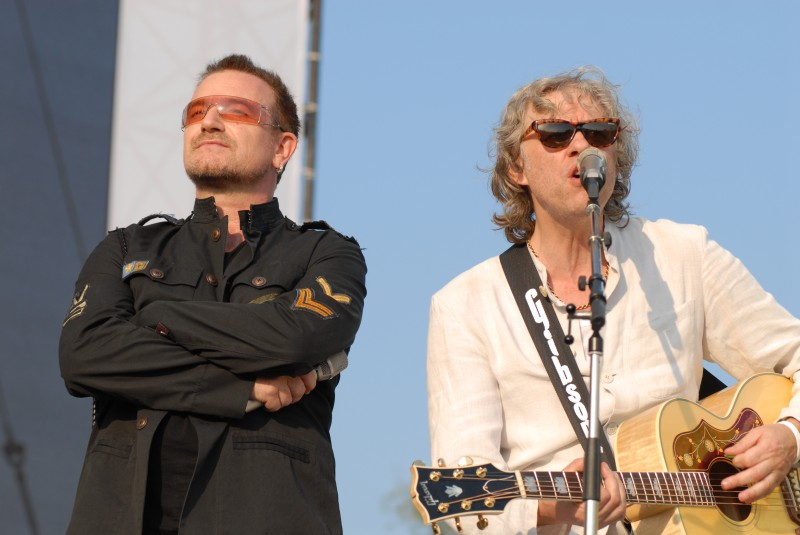
Geldof (right) persuaded a reluctant Bono to sing the line "Well, tonight thank God it's them, instead of you".

Phil Collins arrived with his drum kit to record a live drum track on top of the drum machine. He set up the kit and waited until early evening, after all the vocals had been recorded. Ure was content with the first take, but Collins asked to record a second take, which he was satisfied with. Boy George, who arrived that evening from New York City, was the last to record his part.

Ure began working on the mix as the participants began to party in the studio. Horn produced a B-side, "Feed the World", using the instrumental track and featuring messages from artists who had been at the recording who had been unable to attend, including David Bowie, Paul McCartney, the members of Big Country and Holly Johnson from Frankie Goes to Hollywood. Before departing the Sarm Studio, Geldof recorded a statement which featured as the last message on "Feed the World":

This record was recorded on 25 November 1984. It's now 8 AM in the morning of the 26th. We've been here 24 hours and I think it's time we went home. So from me, Bob Geldof, and Midge, we'd say, "Good morning to you all, and a million thanks to everyone on the record. Have a lovely Christmas."

== Release and promotion ==
The day after recording, Geldof appeared on Mike Read's BBC Radio 1 Breakfast Show to promote the record, and promised that every penny would go to the cause. Most retailers agreed to sell the record at its cost price of £1.35 including VAT; however, some refused, citing cost pressures. The British government donated an amount to the charity equal to the amount of tax they had collected on the single.

Radio 1 began to play the song every hour, far greater than the seven or eight plays per day normally received by an A-list single. The number-one single at the time was "I Should Have Known Better" by Jim Diamond. "Do They Know It's Christmas?" had advance orders of 250,000 within a week of its recording, and orders from record dealers reached one million by 8 December. To meet demand, Phonogram put all five of their European factories to work pressing the single.

Initial quantities of "Do They Know It's Christmas?" were made available from 3 December 1984. It was not officially released until 7 December. It received further publicity from a launch party that day at the Royal Albert Hall during the charity event "Dinner at Albert's", an evening of music to raise money for Save the Children and the Ethiopia Famine Relief Fund. The single entered the UK singles chart the following week at number one, outselling all the other records in the chart put together, with the 7" single alone selling 200,000 copies in the first two days of release. It sold a million copies in the first week, making it the fastest-selling single in UK chart history until Elton John's "Candle in the Wind 1997". UK sales passed three million on the last day of 1984. When Wham!, whose singer George Michael appeared on "Do They Know It's Christmas?", reached number two with their single "Last Christmas", they donated their royalties to the Band Aid Trust.

"Do They Know It's Christmas?" was released in the US on 10 December 1984 on Columbia Records. It sold 1.9 million copies in its first eleven days on release but did not reach number one, due to the more complex chart system, which counted airplay as well as sales. Despite outselling the official number one by four to one, it did not make the top ten due to a lack of airplay, and reached number 13 on the Billboard Hot 100. A 30-minute making-of documentary was released in the UK on 15 December 1984 and in the US on 18 December 1984 on VHS and Betamax. It featured footage shot at the recording session, interviews with Geldof and Ure, as well as the completed promotional video.

"Do They Know It's Christmas?" raised £8 million for Ethiopia within a year, far exceeding Geldof's hopes. It was reissued the following year on 29 November 1985. It reached number three in the UK singles chart the week following Christmas. It was remixed by Horn and included an updated B-side, "One Year On (Feed the World)", beginning and ending with a recording of a telephone message from Geldof and in between featuring Ure reciting a list of what had been bought with the money raised during the previous 12 months. It had sold 11.7 million copies worldwide by 1989, and 3.8 million in the UK by 2017. A parody version, "Do They Know It's Hallowe'en?", was released in 2005. In 2010, the BBC apologised after falsely reporting that money raised by Band Aid and Live Aid had been diverted by rebels and used to pay for weapons.

== Music video ==
As the single was recorded and released as quickly as possible, the music video simply featured footage from the recording session. Bowie, who had been unable to attend the recording, flew from Switzerland to record a short introduction to be played on the BBC's television music show Top of the Pops on 29 November 1984. However, the show's strict regulations meant that the song and its video could not be played until it had charted. Geldof contacted the BBC1 controller, Michael Grade, and persuaded him to have every programme preceding that week's episode start five minutes early to make space for the video before the show. Several artists performing on that week's episode, and the presenter Peter Powell, wore "Feed the World" T-shirts.

The video was shown on Top of the Pops each week during its stay at number one. For the Christmas Day special edition, most of the artists on the record appeared in the studio to mime to the song. The most notable absentees were George Michael and Bono: during Michael's line, the cameras focused on the studio audience, while Weller mimed Bono's line to the camera.

== Reception ==
Sounds wrote, "It's far from brilliant (if not quite the Bland Aid some have predicted) but you can have fun playing Spot the Star on the vocals, and it deserves to sell by the truckload." Melody Maker wrote that the lyric "veers occasionally toward an uncomfortably generalised sentimentality which threatens to turn righteous pleading into pompous indignation", but that "it's impossible to write flippantly about something as fundamentally dreadful as the Ethiopia famine". NME wrote only: "Millions of dead stars write and perform rotten record for the right reasons." The Smiths singer, Morrissey, who was not invited to participate in Band Aid, said in 1985: "It was an awful record considering the mass of talent involved ... It was the most self-righteous platform ever in the history of popular music."

The line "Well, tonight thank God it's them instead of you", sung by Bono, attracted controversy. Bono said he "really, really loathed" the line and had to be persuaded to sing it by Geldof. Geldof said the line was "not soggy liberalism" but "coded anger, like Michael Buerk's report". He said Bono "nailed it" because "he's got a voice from God and he can absorb the sense of a song like few others".

Several publications and commentators described the lyrics as racist and demeaning towards Ethiopians. Ethiopia is home to one of the oldest Christian communities in the world, yet the lyrics and title imply that Africans may be unaware of Christmas. Peter Gill, one of the few Western journalists in Ethiopia at the time, said: "As Ethiopians have pointed out ever since, they did of course know it was Christmas because the starving were mainly [Orthodox] Christian." In 2014, African activists and Twitter users complained that the song disregarded the diversity of Africa and did more harm than good for its people. The musician Fuse ODG declined to sing on the 2014 version, saying the lyrics misrepresented Africa. He cited lyrics such as "There is no peace and joy in west (sic) Africa this Christmas", and said he went to Ghana each year for the purposes of peace and joy.

In the Conversation, the academic Colin Alexander said that efforts such as Band Aid reduce the likelihood of genuine societal or ecological solutions. The academic Tanja R Müller in the journal Third World Quarterly said that it in effect "masks the underlying dynamics of power and of social and economic relations that underpin every famine", reinforcing an anti-political understanding delivered by celebrity humanitarians. In the journal Contemporary British History, the academic Andrew Jones said Band Aid, in supporting individual donations, masks underlying causes of global hunger and poverty. Professor Lisa Ann Richey of the London School of Economics argued that instead of donations, Ethiopians should be paid as the single and the profits it generates are sold as compassion and in turn a moral good that does not address the underlying causes.

In 2010, Geldof told Australia's The Daily Telegraph that he was "responsible for two of the worst songs in history", with the other being "We Are the World". Ure wrote in his autobiography that "it was all about generating money... The song didn't matter: the song was secondary, almost irrelevant." Responding to criticism in 2024, Geldof said "this little pop song has kept hundreds of thousands if not millions of people alive". He said the alleged "colonial tropes" of the lyrics were in fact "empirical facts", and that hunger remains endemic in Ethiopia, water is scarce, rain is increasingly unreliable because of climate change, and that Christmas ceremonies were abandoned throughout 1984 and 1986.

== Personnel ==
Adapted from the record sleeve credits.

Vocalists

- Robert "Kool" Bell (Kool & the Gang)
- Bono (U2)
- Pete Briquette (the Boomtown Rats)
- Adam Clayton (U2)
- Phil Collins (Genesis and solo artist)
- Chris Cross (Ultravox)
- Simon Crowe (the Boomtown Rats)
- Sara Dallin (Bananarama)
- Siobhan Fahey (Bananarama)
- Johnny Fingers (the Boomtown Rats)
- Bob Geldof (the Boomtown Rats)
- Boy George (Culture Club)
- Glenn Gregory (Heaven 17)
- Tony Hadley (Spandau Ballet)
- John Keeble (Spandau Ballet)
- Gary Kemp (Spandau Ballet)
- Martin Kemp (Spandau Ballet)
- Simon Le Bon (Duran Duran)
- Marilyn
- George Michael (Wham!)
- Jon Moss (Culture Club)
- Steve Norman (Spandau Ballet)
- Rick Parfitt (Status Quo)
- Nick Rhodes (Duran Duran)
- Francis Rossi (Status Quo)
- Sting (the Police)
- Andy Taylor (Duran Duran)
- James "J.T." Taylor (Kool & the Gang)
- John Taylor (Duran Duran)
- Roger A. Taylor (Duran Duran)
- Dennis Thomas (Kool & the Gang)
- Midge Ure (Ultravox)
- Martyn Ware (Heaven 17)
- Jody Watley
- Paul Weller (the Style Council)
- Keren Woodward (Bananarama)
- Paul Young

Spoken messages on B-side

- David Bowie
- Stuart Adamson, Mark Brzezicki, Tony Butler, Bruce Watson (Big Country)
- Holly Johnson (Frankie Goes to Hollywood)
- Paul McCartney

Other musicians

- Phil Collins – drums
- John Taylor – bass guitar
- Midge Ure – PPG Wave, Yamaha DX7, OSCar, DrumTraks programming

== Charts ==
=== Weekly charts ===
Chart (1984–2025)	Peak position
Australia (Kent Music Report)	1
Austria (Ö3 Austria Top 40)	1
Belgium (Ultratop 50 Flanders)	1
Canada (RPM 100 Singles)	1
Denmark (Tracklisten)	1
Estonia Airplay (TopHit)	30
Europe (TROS Europarade)	1
France (SNEP)	34
Global 200 (Billboard)	38
Hungary (Rádiós Top 40)	35
Hungary (Stream Top 40)	9
Iceland (Tónlistinn)	27
Ireland (IRMA)	1
Japan (Music Labo)	20
Japan (Oricon)	17
Latvia (LaIPA)	5
Lithuania (AGATA)	43
Luxembourg (Billboard)	22
Netherlands (Dutch Top 40)	1
Netherlands (Single Top 100)	1
New Zealand (Recorded Music NZ)	1
Norway (VG-lista)	1
Poland Airplay (ZPAV)	22
Poland (Polish Streaming Top 100)	23
Portugal (AFP)	36
Romania Airplay (TopHit)	90
Slovakia Airplay (ČNS IFPI)	10
Slovenia (SloTop50)	5
Sweden (Sverigetopplistan)	1
Switzerland (Schweizer Hitparade)	1
UK Singles (Official Charts)	1
US Billboard Hot 100	13
West Germany (GfK)	1
US Rolling Stone Top 100	94

=== Monthly charts ===
Monthly chart performance for "Do They Know It's Christmas?"
Chart (2025)	Peak position
Romania Airplay (TopHit)	97

=== Year-end charts ===
Chart (1984)	Position
UK singles (OCC)	1
Chart (1985)	Position
Australia (Kent Music Report)	19
Belgium (Ultratop Flanders)	61
Netherlands (Dutch Top 40)	66
New Zealand Singles (RMNZ)	10
Switzerland (Schweizer Hitparade)	29
UK singles (OCC)	14
West Germany (Official German Charts)	17

== Certifications and sales ==
Region	Certification	Certified units/sales
Australia (ARIA)	3× Platinum	210,000^{‡}
Canada (Music Canada)	Platinum	200,000
Denmark (IFPI Danmark)	3× Platinum	270,000^{‡}
Germany (BVMI)	Gold	250,000^{‡}
Italy (FIMI) sales since 2009	Platinum	100,000^{‡}
New Zealand (RMNZ)	2× Platinum	60,000^{‡}
Portugal (AFP)	Gold	12,000^{‡}
United Kingdom (BPI) Physical release	Platinum	2,400,000
United Kingdom (BPI) Digital release	5× Platinum	3,000,000^{‡}
United States (RIAA)	Gold	2,500,000
Streaming
Greece (IFPI Greece)	Gold	1,000,000^{†}
Summaries
Worldwide	—	11,700,000
^{‡} Sales+streaming figures based on certification alone.^{†} Streaming-only figures based on certification alone.

== Band Aid II ==
"Do They Know It's Christmas?"

Single by Band Aid II
- B-side: "Do They Know It's Christmas?" (Instrumental)
- Released: 11 December 1989
- Recorded: 2–3 December 1989
- Studio: PWL Studios, London
- Genre: Christmas
- Length: 4:25
- Label: PWL; Polydor
- Songwriters: Bob Geldof; Midge Ure
- Producer: Stock Aitken Waterman

Music video
- "Do They Know It's Christmas?" on YouTube

A second version of "Do They Know It's Christmas?" was recorded under the name of Band Aid II in 1989, overseen by the most successful British production team of the late 1980s, Stock Aitken Waterman. Geldof had telephoned Pete Waterman to ask him to produce a new version of the song to aid the ongoing situation in Ethiopia, and within 24 hours the recording session had been arranged at Stock Aitken Waterman's studio on London's South Bank.

Recording took place over the weekend of 2 and 3 December, and featured several artists who had already been produced by SAW, including Kylie Minogue, Jason Donovan, Bananarama, Sonia, and Cliff Richard, as well as other artists who had big hits in 1989, such as Lisa Stansfield, Jimmy Somerville, Wet Wet Wet and Bros. Bananarama's Sara Dallin and Keren Woodward became the only artists to appear on the 1984 and 1989 versions of the record. Siobhan Fahey, who had been part of Bananarama's line-up at the time the first recording of the song was released, had left the group in 1988.

The lyrics were rearranged for a more traditional 'verse and chorus' structure, with the opening verse being split in two with a short repeat of the ending chorus being played at the end of both, followed by the "here's to you" section and a final lengthened version of the closing chorus (with commentary by Michael Buerk played over the outro in the music video).

Released on 11 December 1989, the Band Aid II version spent three weeks at number one in the UK, becoming the Christmas number one single and the last number one single of the 1980s, and ended the year as the ninth biggest selling single of 1989.

=== Personnel ===
Adapted from the record sleeve credits.

- Bananarama
- Big Fun
- Bros
- Cathy Dennis
- D Mob
- Jason Donovan
- Kevin Godley
- Glen Goldsmith
- Kylie Minogue
- The Pasadenas
- Chris Rea
- Cliff Richard
- Jimmy Somerville
- Sonia
- Lisa Stansfield
- Technotronic (incorrectly listed as "Technotronics" on the record sleeve)
- Wet Wet Wet

Other musicians

- Matt Aitken – keyboards, guitar
- Luke Goss – drums
- Chris Rea – guitar
- Mike Stock – keyboards

=== Charts ===
==== Weekly charts ====
Chart (1989–1990)	Peak position
Australia (ARIA)	30
Belgium (Ultratop 50 Flanders)	17
Europe (Eurochart Hot 100 Singles)	2
Germany (GfK)	74
Ireland (IRMA)	1
Italy (Musica e dischi)	16
Italy Airplay (Music & Media)	6
Netherlands (Single Top 100)	20
New Zealand (Recorded Music NZ)	8
Sweden (Sverigetopplistan)	15
Switzerland (Schweizer Hitparade)	24
UK Singles (Official Charts)	1

==== Year-end charts ====
Chart (1989)	Position
UK singles (OCC)	9

=== Certifications ===
Region	Certification	Certified units/sales
United Kingdom (BPI)	Platinum	600,000^{^}
^{^} Shipments figures based on certification alone.

== Band Aid 20 ==
"Do They Know It's Christmas?"

Single by Band Aid 20
- B-side: "Do They Know It's Christmas?" (original Band Aid version); "Do They Know It's Christmas?" (performed at Live Aid, 1985)
- Released: 29 November 2004
- Recorded: 12–14 November 2004
- Studio: Mayfair (Primrose Hill); AIR (Hampstead, London)
- Genre: Christmas; alternative rock
- Length: 5:07
- Label: Mercury
- Songwriters: Bob Geldof; Midge Ure; Dylan Mills
- Producer: Nigel Godrich

Audio video
- "Do They Know It's Christmas?" on YouTube

Band Aid 20 recorded a third version of "Do They Know It's Christmas?" in November 2004 for the twentieth anniversary of the original recording, and again got to number one. The recording and release of the single tied in with the release of the Live Aid concert on DVD for the first time. The idea was prompted by Coldplay's Chris Martin, although Geldof and Ure both got quickly involved. Geldof did the publicity and educated the younger artists on the issues (some of whom had not been born, or were very young, when the original was recorded) while Ure filmed the event for the corresponding documentary.

The Band Aid 20 version was produced by Nigel Godrich, who was contacted by Ure. Godrich said: "'I thought, 'Oh fuck!' Then I thought I should do it. In our lives we give so little back." He enlisted musicians including Paul McCartney (on bass), the Supergrass drummer Danny Goffey, and Thom Yorke and Jonny Greenwood from Radiohead. Godrich said in 2009: "I'm glad I did it – it raised quite a bit of money. It came on when I was sitting in a lobby somewhere once, and it took me a while to recognise it. It sounded good though, better than I remembered."

The artists gathered to record the chorus at AIR Studios, London, on 14 November 2004. The backing track and many of the solo lines had been recorded over the previous two days. Damon Albarn did not take part in the recording but arrived to serve tea to the participants. The 2004 version sold 1.8 million copies.

=== Personnel ===
Vocalists

- Tim Wheeler (Ash)
- Daniel Bedingfield
- Natasha Bedingfield
- Bono (U2)
- Busted
- Chris Martin (Coldplay)
- Dido
- Dizzee Rascal
- Ms Dynamite
- Skye Edwards (Morcheeba)
- Estelle
- Feeder
- Neil Hannon (the Divine Comedy)
- Justin Hawkins (the Darkness)
- Jamelia
- Tom Chaplin (Keane)
- Tim Rice-Oxley (Keane)
- Beverley Knight
- Lemar
- Shaznay Lewis (All Saints)
- Katie Melua
- Róisín Murphy (Moloko)
- Snow Patrol
- Rachel Stevens
- Joss Stone
- Sugababes
- The Thrills
- Turin Brakes
- Robbie Williams
- Will Young
- Fran Healy (Travis)

Other musicians

- Danny Goffey (Supergrass) – drums
- Jonny Greenwood (Radiohead) – guitar
- Dan Hawkins (The Darkness) – guitar
- Justin Hawkins (The Darkness) – guitar
- Paul McCartney – bass guitar
- Charlie Simpson (Busted) – guitar
- Thom Yorke (Radiohead) – piano

Additional personnel

- Damon Albarn – tea boy
- Bob Geldof – organiser
- Nigel Godrich – producer
- Midge Ure – executive producer

=== Charts and certifications ===
==== Weekly charts ====
Chart (2004–2023)	Peak position
Australia (ARIA)	9
Austria (Ö3 Austria Top 40)	15
Belgium (Ultratop 50 Flanders)	3
Belgium (Ultratop 50 Wallonia)	28
Canada (Nielsen Soundscan)	1
Croatia (HRT)	6
Denmark (Tracklisten)	1
Europe (Eurochart Hot 100)	1
Finland (Suomen virallinen lista)	6
France (SNEP)	72
Germany (GfK)	7
Ireland (IRMA)	1
Italy (FIMI)	1
Netherlands (Single Top 100)	3
New Zealand (Recorded Music NZ)	1
Norway (VG-lista)	1
Scottish Singles Sales (Official Charts)	1
Spain (Promusicae)	1
Sweden (Sverigetopplistan)	2
Switzerland (Schweizer Hitparade)	7
UK Singles (Official Charts)	1

==== Year-end charts ====
Chart (2004)	Position
Belgium (Ultratop 50 Flanders)	91
Ireland (IRMA)	1
Italy (FIMI)	15
Netherlands (Single Top 100)	61
Sweden (Hitlistan)	81
UK singles (OCC)	1

Chart (2005)	Position
Europe (Eurochart Hot 100)	40

=== Certifications ===
Region	Certification	Certified units/sales
Denmark (IFPI Danmark)	Platinum	90,000^{‡}
United Kingdom (BPI)	2× Platinum	1,184,000
^{‡} Sales+streaming figures based on certification alone.

== Band Aid 30 ==
"Do They Know It's Christmas? (2014)"

Single by Band Aid 30
- Released: 17 November 2014
- Recorded: 15 November 2014
- Studio: Sarm West Studios, London
- Genre: Christmas
- Length: 3:48
- Label: Virgin EMI; Island
- Songwriters: Bob Geldof; Midge Ure
- Producer: Paul Epworth

Music video
- "Do They Know It's Christmas?" on YouTube

At a press conference on 10 November 2014, Geldof and Ure announced that another group of artists would come together to record the song, this time under the banner of Band Aid 30 and in aid of the Ebola crisis. The 2014 version was recorded on 15 November 2014 and released on 17 November.

Tracey Emin provided the artwork and Paul Epworth produced the track. Vocal contributions came from artists including Ed Sheeran, One Direction, Paloma Faith, Ellie Goulding, Seal, Sam Smith, Sinéad O'Connor, Rita Ora, Emeli Sandé, Bastille and Olly Murs. Returning guest musicians from previous versions of the song included Chris Martin (who recorded the opening lines of the 2004 version) and Bono (who sang the tenth line in both the 1984 and 2004 versions).

Several contentious lyrics were rewritten, and the lyrics were changed to focus on Ebola rather than famine. The new lyrics were criticised as promoting stereotypes and condescension.

=== Personnel ===
Vocalists

- Bastille
- Bono (U2)
- Alfie Deyes
- Paloma Faith
- Guy Garvey (Elbow)
- Ellie Goulding
- Angélique Kidjo
- Chris Martin (Coldplay)
- Sinéad O'Connor
- One Direction
- Rita Ora
- Olly Murs
- Emeli Sandé
- Seal
- Ed Sheeran
- Sam Smith
- Joe Sugg
- Zoe Sugg
- Karl Hyde (Underworld)
- Jessie Ware

Other musicians

- Neil Amin-Smith (Clean Bandit) – violin
- Grace Chatto (Clean Bandit) – cello
- Roger Taylor (Queen) – drums, keyboards

Additional personnel:

- Paul Epworth – producer

=== German version ===
A German-language version of "Do They Know It's Christmas?" was released on 21 November 2014. It was produced by Vincent Sorg and Tobias Kuhn and features vocals from artists including 2raumwohnung, Andreas Bourani, Die Toten Hosen, Jan Delay, Joy Denalane, Max Raabe, Milky Chance, Peter Maffay, Silbermond, Thees Uhlmann, and Wolfgang Niedecken.

=== Track listing ===
Digital download
No.	Title	Length
1.	"Do They Know It's Christmas? (2014)"	3:48

German digital download – German version
No.	Title	Length
1.	"Do They Know It's Christmas? (2014)" (Deutsche version)	3:55

German CD single
No.	Title	Length
1.	"Do They Know It's Christmas? (2014)" (Deutsche version)	3:56
2.	"Do They Know It's Christmas? (2014)"	3:50

German CD maxi-single
No.	Title	Length
1.	"Do They Know It's Christmas? (2014)" (Deutsche version)	3:56
2.	"Do They Know It's Christmas? (2014)"	3:50
3.	"Do They Know It's Christmas? (2004 version)" (Band Aid 20)	5:06
4.	"Do They Know It's Christmas? (1989 version)" (Band Aid II)	4:22
5.	"Do They Know It's Christmas? (1984 version)" (Band Aid)	3:52

=== Charts and certifications ===
==== Weekly charts ====
British and Irish version (original)

Chart (2014–2022)	Peak position
Australia (ARIA)	3
Austria (Ö3 Austria Top 40)	5
Belgium (Ultratop 50 Flanders)	1
Belgium (Ultratop 50 Wallonia)	3
Canada Hot 100 (Billboard)	8
Denmark (Tracklisten)	35
France (SNEP)	25
Germany (GfK)	2
Hungary (Rádiós Top 40)	26
Hungary (Single Top 40)	1
Ireland (IRMA)	1
Italy (FIMI)	11
Japan Hot 100 (Billboard)	31
Netherlands (Single Top 100)	4
New Zealand (Recorded Music NZ)	2
Norway (VG-lista)	40
Poland Airplay (ZPAV)	84
Scottish Singles Sales (Official Charts)	1
Slovenia (SloTop50)	31
Spain (Promusicae)	1
Switzerland (Schweizer Hitparade)	5
UK Singles (Official Charts)	1
US Billboard Hot 100	63
US Adult Contemporary (Billboard)	16

German version

Chart (2014)	Peak position
Austria (Ö3 Austria Top 40)	10
Germany (GfK)	1
Switzerland (Schweizer Hitparade)	21

==== Year-end charts ====
Chart (2014)	Position
UK singles (OCC)	31

=== Certifications ===
Region	Certification	Certified units/sales
Germany (BVMI)	Gold	200,000^{‡}
New Zealand (RMNZ)	Gold	7,500^{*}
United Kingdom (BPI)	Platinum	600,000^{‡}
^{*} Sales figures based on certification alone.^{‡} Sales+streaming figures based on certification alone.

=== Release history ===
Country	Date	Format	Label
United Kingdom	17 November 2014	Digital download	Virgin EMI
Germany	21 November 2014	Digital download	Virgin EMI
Germany	28 November 2014	CD single; CD maxi-single	Virgin EMI

== Band Aid 40 ==
A version combining elements of the original, 20th and 30th anniversary versions of "Do They Know It's Christmas?", mixed and produced by Trevor Horn, was released on 25 November 2024, the song's 40th anniversary. It reached #8 on the UK singles chart.

Ed Sheeran, who contributed vocals to the 2014 version, said he would have refused permission to reuse his vocals had he been asked, saying his opinion about the song had changed. He shared a post by the British-Ghanaian vocalist Fuse ODG, saying the song "perpetuated damaging stereotypes that stifle Africa's economic growth, tourism and investment, ultimately costing the continent trillions and destroying its dignity, pride and identity".

== Glee Cast version ==
"Do They Know It's Christmas?"

Single by Glee cast

from the album Glee: The Music, The Christmas Album Volume 2
- Released: 15 November 2011
- Recorded: 2011
- Genre: Pop, Christmas
- Length: 3:25
- Label: Columbia
- Songwriters: Bob Geldof; Midge Ure

Audio video
- "Do They Know It's Christmas?" on YouTube

"Do They Know It's Christmas?" was covered by the cast of Glee and released in 2011 as a single and alongside the full-length album Glee: The Music, The Christmas Album Volume 2. It was featured in the season three Christmas episode "Extraordinary Merry Christmas".

=== Charts ===
Chart (2011–12)	Peak position
Canada Hot 100 (Billboard)	85
US Billboard Hot 100	92
US Holiday 100 (Billboard)	18

== Band Aid Liverpool version ==
In December 2020, a group of musicians from Liverpool recorded a version of "Do They Know It's Christmas?" under the name Band Aid Liverpool as a charity record in support of Shelter. Retitled "Do They Know It's Christmas (Feed the World)" with lyrics referring to places on Merseyside, the project was given the go-ahead by Bob Geldof and Midge Ure, with Band Aid Liverpool releasing their cover version on 10 December 2020.

== Keith Lemon version ==
In December 2020, the comedian Leigh Francis recorded a version as his character Keith Lemon, featuring the singers Pixie Lott, Emma Bunton, Rick Astley, Ronan Keating, Ricky Wilson, Matt Goss and Fleur East. Proceeds went to charities including the Trussell Trust.

== LadBaby version ==
"Food Aid"

Single by LadBaby
- Released: 16 December 2022
- Recorded: 2022
- Genre: Christmas
- Length: 4:01
- Label: Frtyfve
- Songwriters: Mark Hoyle; Amy Wadge; Bob Geldof; Midge Ure; Martin Lewis

LadBaby singles chronology
"Sausage Rolls for Everyone" (2021)	"Food Aid" (2022)

Music video
- "Food Aid" on YouTube

On 12 December 2022, the British blogger Mark Hoyle, aka LadBaby, announced that he had received permission to rewrite the lyrics to "Do They Know It's Christmas?" and release it as his 2022 Christmas single. Retitled "Food Aid", the single was released on 16 December 2022, and featured Hoyle's wife Roxanne and the financial journalist Martin Lewis. Half of the money raised went to the Trussell Trust and the other half to the Band Aid Trust. LadBaby achieved the Christmas number one for the fifth consecutive year, making them the first act to achieve five UK Christmas number-one singles, surpassing the record set by the Beatles.

=== Charts ===
Chart performance for "Food Aid"
Chart (2022)	Peak position
Hungary (Single Top 40)	32
UK Singles (Official Charts)	1
UK Independent (Official Charts)	1

== See also ==
- "Starvation/Tam Tam Pour L'Ethiopie", a 1985 charity single featuring British and African artists
- "Tears Are Not Enough", a 1985 charity single recorded by Northern Lights, a supergroup of Canadian artists
- "Sammen for Livet" by Forente Artister, a 1985 charity single featuring Norwegian artists
