= She's So Modern =

Single by The Boomtown Rats

from the album A Tonic for the Troops
- B-side: "Lying Again"
- Released: 31 March 1978 (UK)
- Genre: Punk rock, new wave, power pop
- Length: 2:58
- Label: Ensign Records (UK)
- Songwriters: Bob Geldof, Johnny Fingers
- Producer: Robert John "Mutt" Lange

The Boomtown Rats singles chronology
"Mary of the 4th Form" (1977)	"She's So Modern" (1978)	"Like Clockwork" (1978)

"She's So Modern" is a song by The Boomtown Rats. It was the first single taken from the band's second album A Tonic for the Troops, whose title comes from a line in this song: "Charlie ain't no Nazi, she just likes to wear her leather boots, 'cos it's exciting for the veterans and it's a tonic for the troops". The single continued the Rats' high-energy post-punk/new wave sound that had typified earlier releases, but its fame would later be eclipsed by that of the band's more ballad-like global hit "I Don't Like Mondays". It has been described as "harmlessly smirking bubblegum a la The Knack".

"She's So Modern" was commercially successful, the third of the band's singles to reach the UK Top 20 and the second to reach the Irish Top 10. Indeed, according to reviewer Brian Bock the song was "written explicitly (and successfully) to be a hit". It spent eleven weeks on the UK Singles Chart, peaking at No. 12.

== Video performances ==
On both the promotional video and on performances on Top of the Pops, the band started a comic-effect tradition of making no genuine attempt to mime effectively on camera, a trait especially exaggerated on Simon Crowe's 'missed' drumming.

== Personnel ==
- Bob Geldof – vocals.
- Pete Briquette – bass, vocals
- Gerry Cott – guitar
- Johnnie Fingers – keyboards, vocals
- Simon Crowe – drums, vocals
- Garry Roberts – guitar, vocals
