= Smash (music promoters) =

Japanese concert promoter

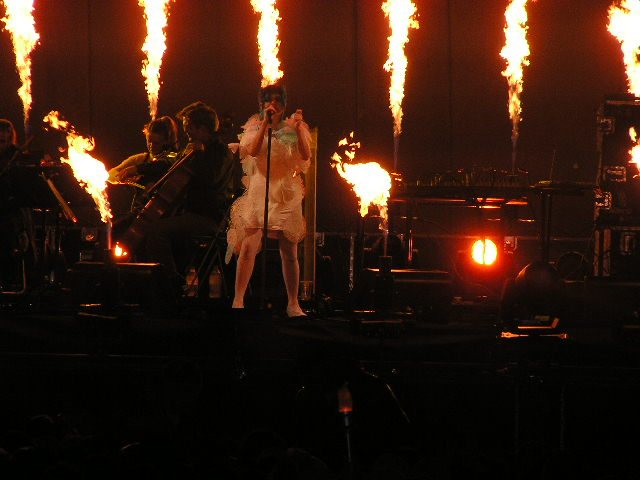
Björk, the main stage, Fuji Rock Festival, 2003

Smash, also known as Smash Japan, is a Japanese rock music concert and festival promoter. Smash has its headquarters in Tokyo, with offices in Osaka (Smash West) and London (Smash UK). Smash is regularly represented by its point man, former Boomtown Rats member, Johnnie Fingers.

== Fuji Rock Festival ==
Smash produces Fuji Rock Festival which takes place the last weekend in July in Naeba, Niigata Prefecture, Japan. The festival regularly draws more than 100,000 music fans. Artists appearing regularly include: Björk, Chemical Brothers, Iggy Pop, Sonic Youth and many more.

== Other music festivals ==
Smash also produces Asagiri Jam which takes place in October in Shizuoka Prefecture.

They co-promoted Electraglide, a former annual all night dance/rock event located at Makuhari Messe that took place in late November or early December. Electraglide regularly featured Underworld, 2 Many DJs, Fatboy Slim and many others.

Apart from major music festivals, Smash regular produces rock concerts throughout Japan.

== See also ==
Fuji Rock Festival
