= Dún Laoghaire (disambiguation) =

Dún Laoghaire is the county town of Dún Laoghaire–Rathdown in Ireland.

It may also refer to:

- Borough of Dún Laoghaire, a former administrative unit around the town (abolished 1994)
- Dún Laoghaire (Dáil constituency), a parliamentary constituency (created 1977)
- Dún Laoghaire, a B-side to the Boomtown Rats single Like Clockwork (released 1978)
