= The Brilliant Book =

British children's television series

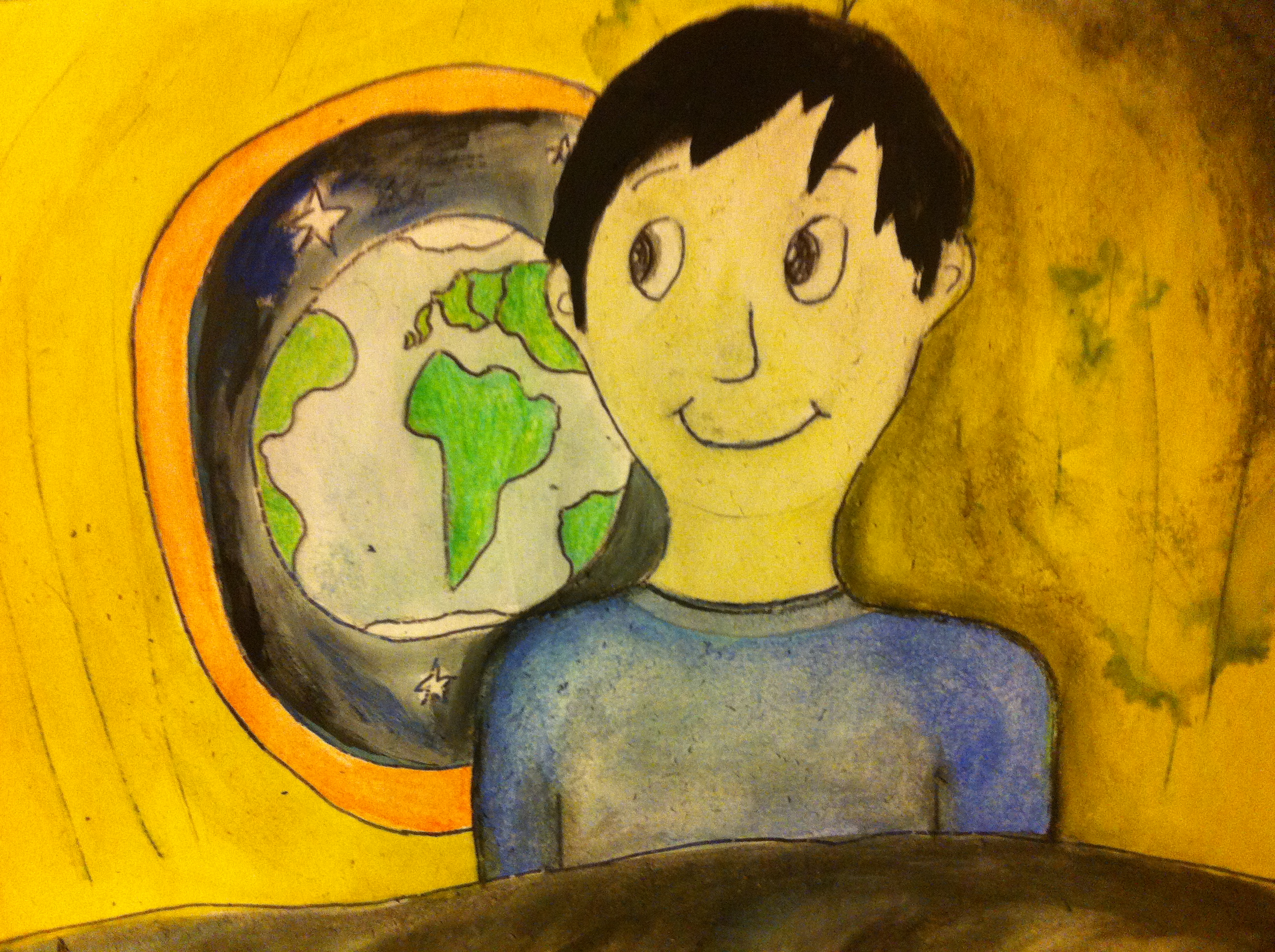
'Adventure' is part of a trio of works created to illustrate the lyrics of a song by the same name.

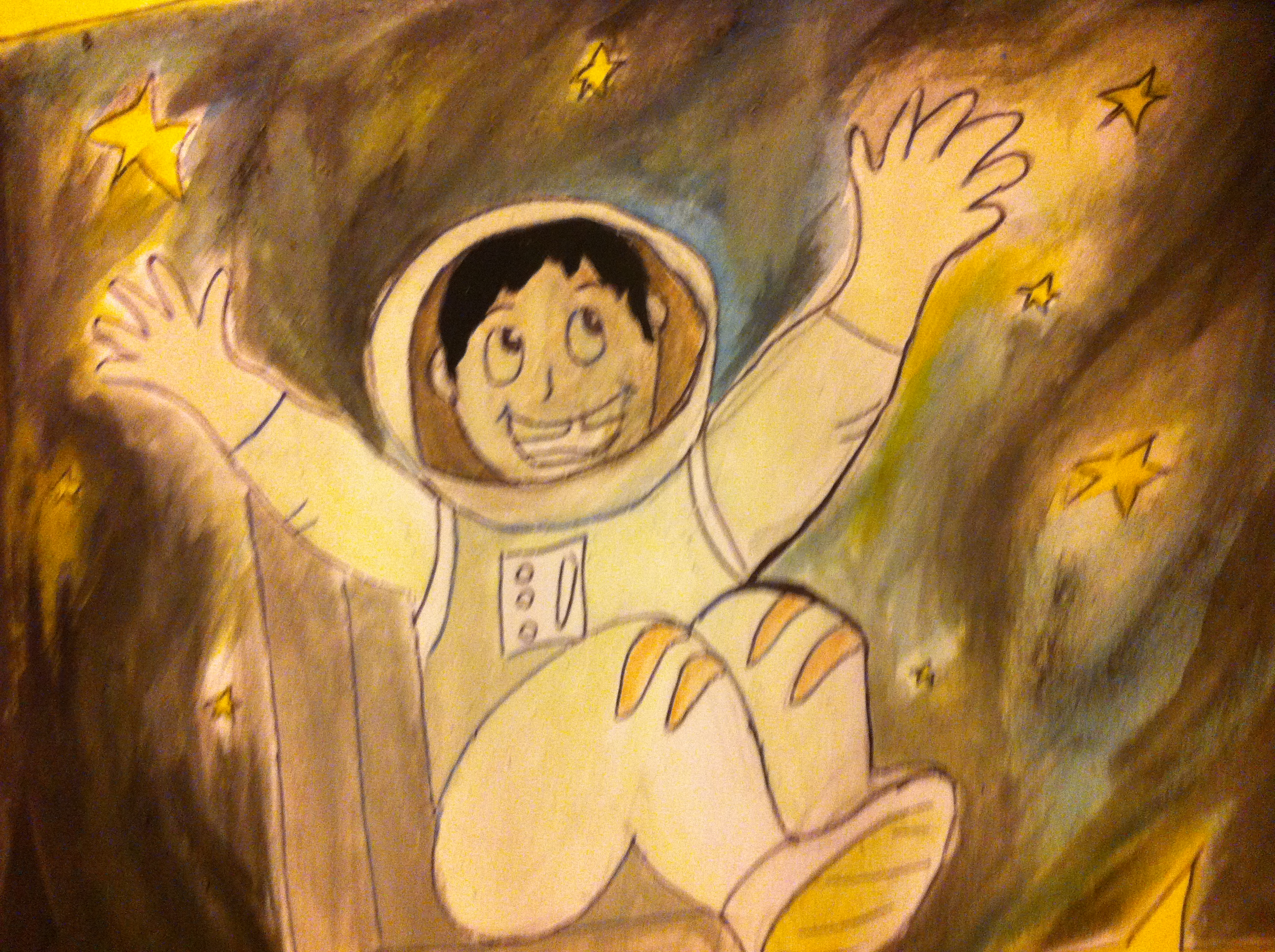
'Over The Moon' illustrates the lyrics '...over the moon, into a brand new galaxy...', the piece is part of a trio created to illustrate specific lyrics in the song 'Adventure'.

The Brilliant Book is a British television series for children.

It follows Benjamin, a nine-year-old boy, who has autism, and charts his and his friends' adventures. The show comes in 30-minute episodes, each of which are "loosely based on a letter of the alphabet". It has animated segments and film clips of Benjamin and his friends; each day Benjamin adds an adventure to his "brilliant book".

The show is created by Rhonda Merrick, a US native who lives in Britain; she also does the animations. The "Benjamin" of the show is her own son Benjamin.
