= Like Clockwork =

Single by The Boomtown Rats

from the album A Tonic for the Troops
- B-side: "How Do You Do?"
- Released: 9 June 1978
- Genre: New wave, post-punk
- Length: 3:45
- Label: Ensign Records (UK); Columbia Records (US)
- Songwriters: Bob Geldof - lyrics Pete Briquette and Simon Crowe - music
- Producer: Robert John "Mutt" Lange

The Boomtown Rats singles chronology
"She's So Modern" (1978)	"Like Clockwork" (1978)	"Rat Trap" (1978)

"Like Clockwork" is a single by The Boomtown Rats. It was the band's first to reach the Top Ten in the UK Singles Chart, peaking at No. 6.

Described as "simple, cool", in concerts supporting A Tonic for the Troops, the song's agitated, staccato bassline made it a common show opener. The B-side, "How Do You Do?" was a fast-paced punk/new-wave song, in the mould of the band's earlier work. However, the Irish version of the single, released on Mulligan Records, substituted the B-side with "D.U.N L.A.O.G.H.A.I.R.E", a tongue in cheek samba, discussing the spelling of the band's home town, written Dún Laoghaire but pronounced Dunleary. The latter was later released in the UK as a free flexi disc, distributed by Flexipop in January 1981. "Like Clockwork" was the first song on air broadcast on RTÉ Radio 2, when the station began broadcasting on 31 May 1979, played by Larry Gogan.

== Personnel ==
- Bob Geldof – vocals, saxophone
- Pete Briquette – bass, vocals
- Gerry Cott – guitar
- Johnnie Fingers – keyboards, vocals
- Simon Crowe – drums, vocals
- Garry Roberts – guitar, vocals
