= Rat Trap =

Single by The Boomtown Rats

from the album A Tonic for the Troops
- B-side: "So Strange"
- Released: 6 October 1978
- Genre: New wave; pop rock
- Length: 4:55
- Label: Ensign (UK); Columbia (US)
- Songwriter(s): Bob Geldof
- Producer(s): Robert John "Mutt" Lange

The Boomtown Rats singles chronology
"Like Clockwork" (1978)	"Rat Trap" (1978)	"I Don't Like Mondays" (1979)

"Rat Trap" is a song by the Boomtown Rats, released in October 1978 as the third and final single from the band's second album A Tonic for the Troops. It reached No. 1 on the UK Singles Chart for two weeks in November 1978, the first single by a punk or new wave act to do so. The song was written by Bob Geldof, and produced by Robert John "Mutt" Lange. It replaced "Summer Nights", a hit single for John Travolta and Olivia Newton-John from the soundtrack of Grease, at number one on the UK chart after the latter's seven-week reign.

== Song ==
"Rat Trap" is a rock song, telling the tale of a boy called Billy who feels the depressing town he lives in is a "rat trap".

When the band performed the song on Top of the Pops (which is also mentioned in the song) as the UK new number one, the band members began by tearing up pictures of Travolta and Newton-John to emphasise the fact that the pair - who had spent a total of 16 weeks out of the preceding 22 at the top of the charts - had been deposed. Geldof mimed the saxophone part on a candelabra, a jest he explained in his autobiography Is That It?: "The Musicians' Union had forbidden me to play saxophone on the video, as obviously I hadn't done so on the record. But I saw a candelabra on the piano at the shoot and I put a mouthpiece in the central candle holder and played it. The impact of video came home when during the next few British gigs kids pulled out candelabras from nowhere and began playing them during the sax solo in 'Rat Trap'".

In the music video, which was directed by David Mallet, various members of the band are seen reading copies of the novel Rat Trap by the Welsh author Craig Thomas, although the book has no connection to the song. The lyric about "pus and grime..." was changed to "blood and tears pour down the drains and the sewers", although Geldof mumbled the line anyway.

One of the more popular Boomtown Rats songs, it was performed by them at Live Aid and is still performed by Geldof to this day. During the Live Aid performance, Geldof's microphone went dead (apparently from the cable being damaged), causing Simon Crowe's harmony vocals to become the only audible voice on the last half of the song.

In 1996, Geldof recorded a self-mocking cover version of the song with Dustin the Turkey which reached number one in Ireland.

== Personnel ==
- Bob Geldof – vocals
- Pete Briquette – bass, vocals
- Gerry Cott – guitar
- Johnnie Fingers – keyboards, vocals
- Simon Crowe – drums, vocals
- Garry Roberts – guitar, vocals
- Alan Holmes – saxophone
