= Brentwood Festival =

Music festival in Brentwood, England

The Brentwood Festival is an annual music festival held at the Brentwood Centre in Brentwood, Essex every July. The festival donates a share of its proceeds to charity, and has raised a total of £120,000 for various causes. As well as live music, the festival hosts a selection of over 100 real ales, a food market, fairground rides and additional activities for children.

The festival evolved from a smaller event at the White Horse pub in Coxtie Green near the town, and has steadily grown to its current size, with over 12,000 attending the 2014 event.

The 2013 festival featured Chas 'n' Dave and former Jam bassist Bruce Foxton. The 2014 festival was headlined by UB40 (featuring Ali Campbell, Astro and Mickey Virtue) and The Dualers. Ocean Colour Scene's Simon Fowler and Oscar Harrison performed a special acoustic set. Other appearances at the festival include Kool as the Gang, Glitterball, Missing Andy, The Kubricks, The Show, Dani Clay, Finding Albert, Mila Falls, Welcome Pariah, D’lys, Braats, New Killer Shoes, El Deyma, Any Colour You Like, The Popettes, Funky Voices, Grounds for Divorce, Rhonda Merrick, Mannequins, One Step Behind, Undercover, Looking For Liam, The Long Run, The Sea, The Victories, Loni Lincoln, Graham Okey, and Electric Child House.

The 2015 festival starred Pixie Lott, who grew up in Brentwood, along with The Human League and Jocelyn Brown. The 2016 festival featured the Boomtown Rats. Lead singer Bob Geldof was criticised for telling the crowd "you are wearing wall to wall fucking Primark. This is a rock and roll festival."
