= Banana Republic (song) =

1980 single by The Boomtown Rats

Single by The Boomtown Rats

from the album Mondo Bongo
- B-side: "Man at the Top"
- Released: 14 November 1980
- Genre: New wave, reggae
- Length: 3:24 (album version 5:01)
- Label: Ensign Records (UK); Columbia Records (USA)
- Songwriters: Pete Briquette, Bob Geldof
- Producer: Tony Visconti

The Boomtown Rats singles chronology
"Someone's Looking at You" (1980)	"Banana Republic" (1980)	"Up All Night" (1981)

"Banana Republic" was the first single from The Boomtown Rats' album Mondo Bongo. It peaked at number three in the UK Singles Chart.

Breaking from the band's previous new wave sound, the song opens with a ska-reggae hook (that repeats at the close of the much longer album version). However, the song itself is a more mainstream piece musically. The "banana republic" that the song describes is actually a deliberately scathing portrait of the Republic of Ireland, the band's country of origin, and was written in response to the band being banned from performing there. This in turn was reputedly because of Geldof's "denunciation of nationalism, medieval-minded clerics and corrupt politicians" in a memorably controversial 1977 interview/performance on Ireland's The Late Late Show with Gay Byrne.

== Charts ==
Chart (1980–81)	Peak position
Australia (Kent Music Report)	18
Belgium (Ultratop 50 Flanders)	30
Canada Top Singles (RPM)	47
Germany (GfK)	3
Ireland (IRMA)	3
Netherlands (Single Top 100)	35
Norway (VG-lista)	3
South Africa (Springbok Radio)	12
Sweden (Sverigetopplistan)	7
Switzerland (Schweizer Hitparade)	10
UK Singles (Official Charts)	3
