= The Boomtown Rats =

Irish rock band

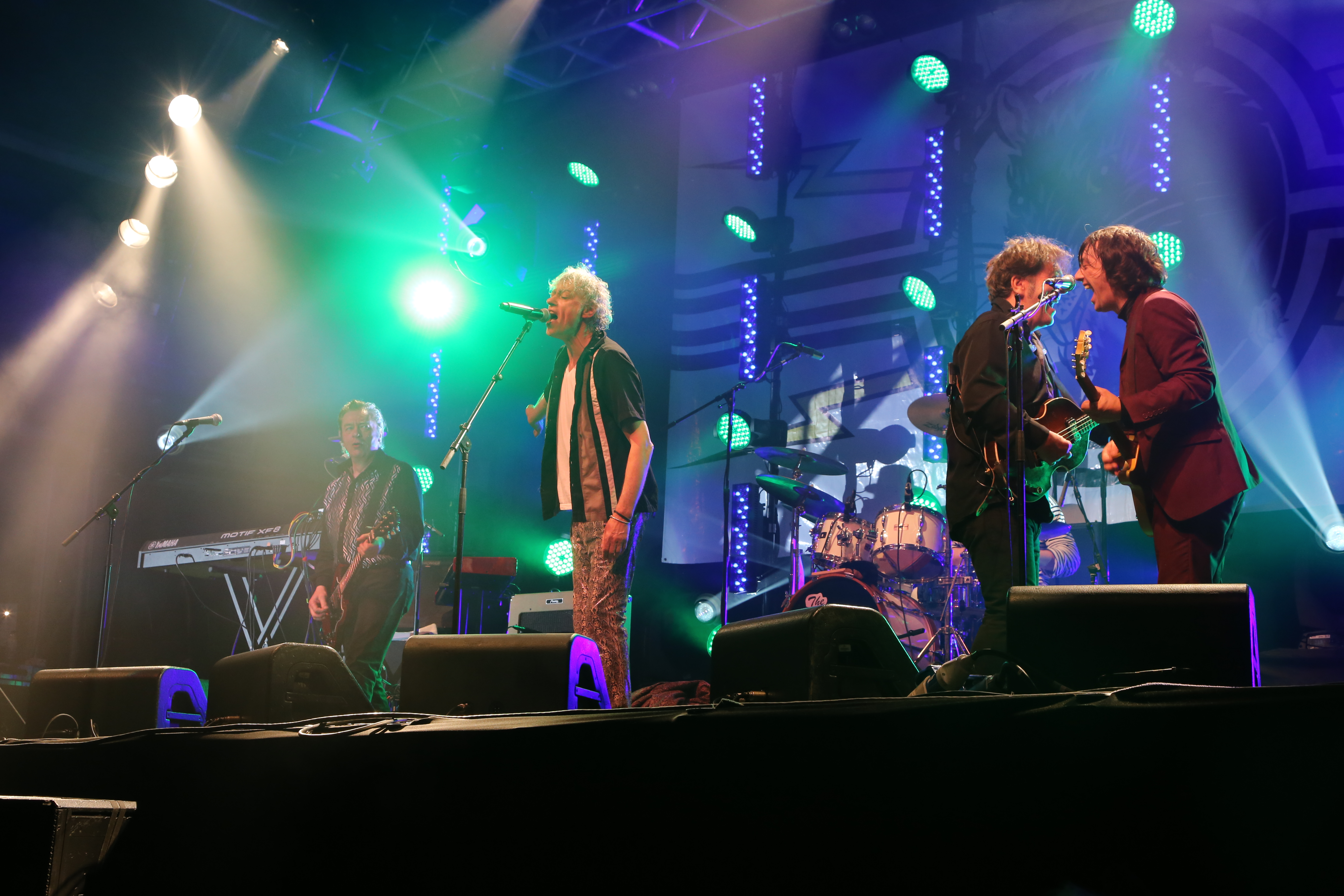
- The Boomtown Rats performing at Concert at the Kings 2014

Background information
- Origin: Dublin, Ireland
- Genres: New wave; power pop; pop rock; pub rock
- Years active: 1975–1986, 2013–present
- Labels: Mulligan, Ensign, Mercury, WEA Ireland, Columbia, BMG
- Members: Bob Geldof; Pete Briquette; Simon Crowe
- Past members: Garry Roberts; Johnnie Fingers; Gerry Cott

The Boomtown Rats are an Irish rock and new wave band originally formed in Dublin in 1975. Between 1977 and 1985, they had a series of Irish and UK hits including "Like Clockwork", "Rat Trap", "I Don't Like Mondays", and "Banana Republic". The original line-up comprised six musicians; five from Dún Laoghaire in County Dublin; Gerry Cott (rhythm guitar), Simon Crowe (drums), Johnnie Fingers (keyboards), Bob Geldof (vocals), and Garry Roberts (lead guitar), plus Fingers's cousin Pete Briquette (bass). The Boomtown Rats broke up in 1986, but reformed in 2013, without Fingers or Cott. Garry Roberts died in 2022. The band's fame and notability have been overshadowed by the charity work of frontman Bob Geldof.

== History ==
=== Beginnings ===
The band was formed in 1975 with five of the six members having come from Dún Laoghaire, while Pete Briquette was originally from Ballyjamesduff, County Cavan, Ireland. Geldof initially managed the band but took over the lead vocals from Garry Roberts. Initially known as The Nightlife Thugs, the group changed their name to The Boomtown Rats, which Geldof had taken from the name of Woody Guthrie's boyhood gang mentioned in Guthrie's autobiography Bound for Glory. The name change came during their first gig on Halloween Night, which took place at Bolton St College of Technology, Dublin (known now as TU Dublin Bolton Street). At the break in the middle of that first gig, Bob Geldof scrubbed The Nightlife Thugs from the blackboard beside the stage where their name was displayed and replaced it with 'The Boomtown Rats'.

In the summer of 1976, the group played their first UK gig as well as gigs in Amsterdam, and Groningen in The Netherlands before moving to London where they signed with Ensign Records later that year. Their first single, "Lookin' After No. 1", released in August 1977 after a year of touring, including a support slot with Tom Petty. It reached the Top 40 of the UK singles chart at No. 11. Their first album The Boomtown Rats was released the following month and included another single, "Mary of the 4th Form" reached No. 15 in December. Music journalist Martin C. Strong commented, "Geldof's moody charisma helped to give the band a distinct identity".

=== Mainstream success ===
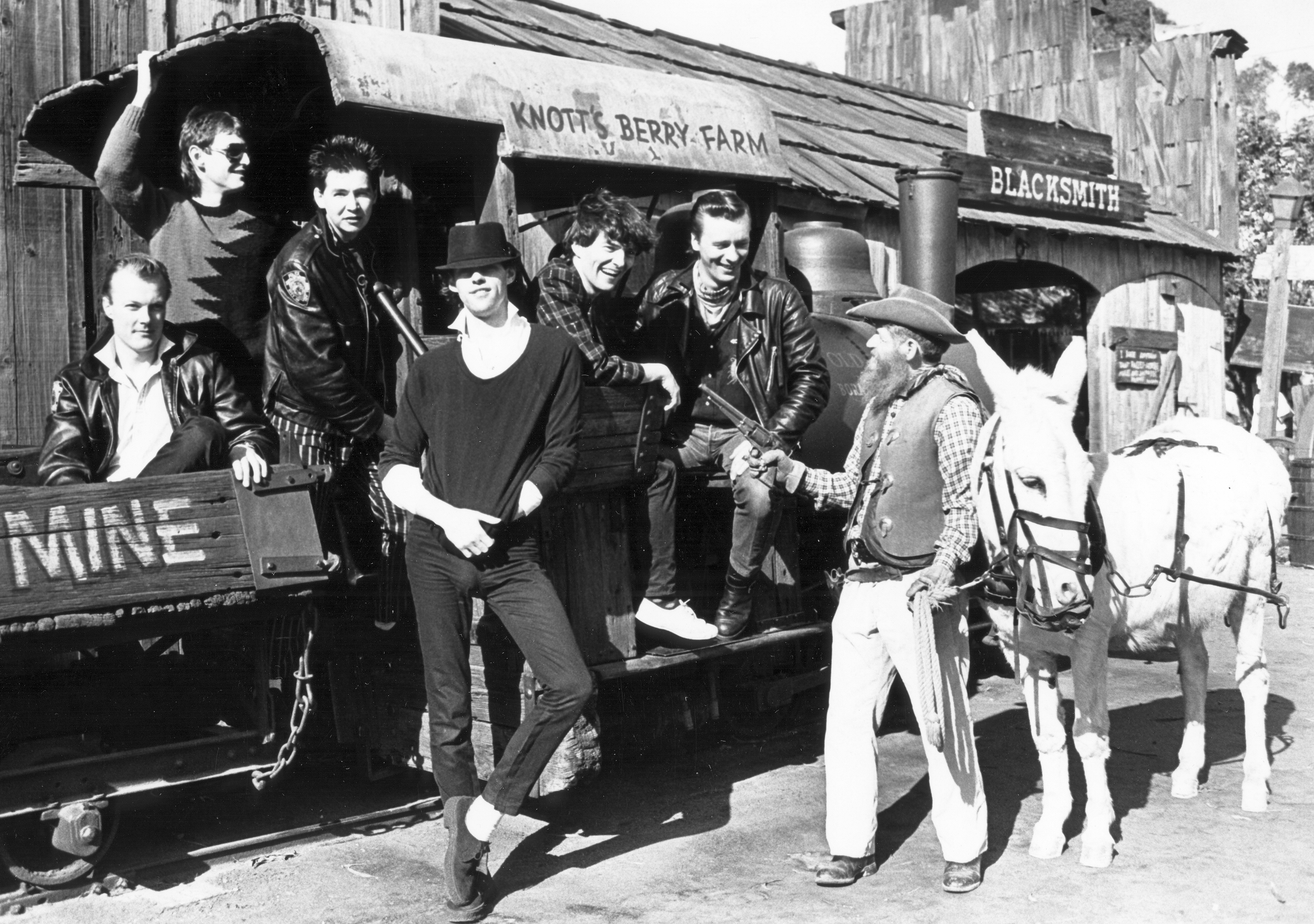
The Boomtown Rats at Knott's Berry Farm in 1981

The band together with producer Mutt Lange embarked on recording their next album, A Tonic for the Troops (1978). In May, the first single "She's So Modern" reached No. 12 in UK chart. A headlining tour around the UK culminated in a show filmed at the Hammersmith Odeon. The second single "Like Clockwork" reached the UK Top Ten at No. 6 in July. The album was released shortly after, while in early November, the third single "Rat Trap" became the first rock song by an Irish band to reach No. 1 in the UK. In addition, "Rat Trap" was also the first new wave song to claim the number one spot. The U.S. version of the album (with a slightly different selection of tracks) came out the next year on Columbia Records.

The band returned to the recording studio with Lange to produce a follow-up in 1979, while they embarked on a U.S. tour in support of the album with moderate success. The single "I Don't Like Mondays" was released in July, also reached No. 1 in the UK. The song was written in response to a school shooting in California, and became a worldwide Top Ten hit, except for the United States. It was the band's only song to reach the U.S. Billboard Hot 100 and was included in the band's third album, The Fine Art of Surfacing released in November of that year. The album also contained "Diamond Smiles" and their next Top 10 hit in the UK, "Someone's Looking at You".

In December 1980, "Banana Republic" was released, which was their last Top 10 hit, reaching No. 3. In the following year, the Boomtown Rats' next studio album Mondo Bongo produced by Tony Visconti appeared. A second single, "Elephant's Graveyard (Guilty)", charted at 26, while the title track was released in the U.S. without much success. During the subsequent tour, Gerry Cott decided to depart the band, which continued as a quintet. In December 1981 the single "Never in a Million Years" stalled at No. 62 in the UK chart.

The band's fifth album, V Deep, again produced by Visconti, was released in February 1982. A second single from the album "House on Fire" made number 24 in the UK singles chart. A third,"'Charmed Lives" failed to chart however. In the U.S., the album was initially rejected by their American label, which instead issued a four-song EP called The Boomtown Rats, featuring four selections from V Deep. The full album was eventually issued in the U.S. in late 1982. The same year Geldof appeared in the film Pink Floyd – The Wall directed by Alan Parker.

A follow-up album entitled In The Long Grass was recorded in 1983, but was initially rejected by the group's label. By 1984, the band was touring universities after becoming unable to fund the "guarantee" required to book mainstream concert halls. In The Long Grass was finally issued in the UK in May 1984, but failed to chart. Two singles, "Tonight" and "Drag Me Down", were taken from the album; these reached the lower rungs of the UK singles chart, but two further singles, "Dave" and "A Hold of Me", failed to register.

The Boomtown Rats' involvement with Band Aid (on which they all played) raised their profile again, and in January 1985, a revised version of In the Long Grass was finally released in the U.S. The album made the U.S. chart at No. 188, but the associated singles failed to make an impact on the charts or on the radio. The band subsequently performed at Live Aid's charity performance.

"Dave", a single from the original release of In the Long Grass, was re-recorded as "Rain" for the U.S. market. The song was about the band's saxophone player and school friend David McHale, who had suffered a breakdown after his girlfriend was found dead in a public toilet next to an empty heroin bag.

=== Break up ===
After Live Aid, the band was on hiatus while Geldof focused on the Band Aid Trust. The band's final performance came at Self Aid, a May 1986 concert at the RDS in Dublin, to raise awareness of unemployment in Ireland. Their rendition of "Joey's on the Street Again" was 12 minutes long, with an extended bridge, during which time Geldof ran among the crowd. It also included a rendition of Woody Guthrie's song "Greenback Dollar", which provided circularity and closure. Following this performance, Geldof addressed the crowd, saying, "It's been a great ten years; rest in peace". The band then performed "Looking After No.1".

Following the band's break-up, Geldof launched a solo career with Pete Briquette continuing to work alongside him.

Garry Roberts co-wrote songs for Kirsty MacColl before leaving the music business and going on to become a successful salesman of financial services. Roberts later presented his Guitar Workshop to schools, encouraging pupils to play the instrument and emphasising the contribution of the blues to modern rock and pop music.

Fingers became a successful record producer in Japan, as well as being part of the Japanese band Greengate. Simon Crowe was in the West Country-based Celtic instrumental band Jiggerypipery and has also run a clock-making business.

In 2005, the band's albums were all remastered and re-released and a 'Best Of' compilation was released, along with two DVDs. Briquette mixed the live DVD and Francesco Cameli mixed the extra tracks for the re-release of the Boomtown Rats albums at Sphere Studios in London.

=== The Rats ===
In 2008, Garry Roberts and Simon Crowe, who had continued playing together in The Fab Four, with Alan Perman (ex Herman's Hermits) and Bob Doyle (who once auditioned unsuccessfully for E.L.O.), and The Velcro Flies, with Steve (Dusty) Hill and Gavin Petrie, got together as "The Rats", playing their favourite Boomtown Rats songs, with two guitars, bass and drums. The band was initially fronted by Peter Barton, who since the early 1980s has played with several resurrected acts, including The Animals, The Hollies and Lieutenant Pigeon. Barton was replaced on lead vocals and bass by Bob Bradbury, who was the founder and main songwriter in Hello. Darren Beale, formerly of The Caves, played lead guitar. Saxophone player Andy Hamilton, who toured and recorded with The Boomtown Rats, including at Live Aid, played as a guest at some gigs.

Gerry Cott and Johnnie Fingers were invited to join the band when circumstances allowed. Cott attended The Rats' second gig (at The 100 Club on Oxford Street, London). Fingers, meanwhile, worked for the Fuji Rock Festival in Japan, but planned to join the band on stage when he was in the UK.

On 21 June 2009, Geldof, Roberts, and Briquette got together in Dublin to play "Dave", at a party to celebrate the life of Boomtown Rats' close friend and saxophone player, "Doctor" Dave MacHale, who had died of cancer in Frankfurt.

On 20 September 2011, Gerry Cott guested with Geldof's band at The Cadogan Hall, London. They played three Boomtown Rats songs prior to the encores. Cott returned to the stage for the final encore playing on two Geldof solo songs.

=== The Boomtown Rats reform ===
Bob Geldof, Gary Roberts, Pete Briquette, and Simon Crowe reunited as The Boomtown Rats in 2013, joined by Alan Dunn (longtime member of Geldof's band) on keyboards and Darren Beale (who played with Roberts & Crowe in The Rats) on guitar. Bob Geldof said, "Playing again with the Rats and doing those great songs again will be exciting afresh. We were an amazing band and I just feel it's the right time to re-Rat, to go back to Boomtown for a visit." In June 2013, it was announced that the band would be embarking on a UK and Ireland tour supported by a new compilation album, Back to Boomtown: Classic Rats Hits. The group performed at the Brentwood Festival in 2016, where Geldof attracted controversy for criticising the audience. In April 2017, the band returned to the studio to record new material for their first studio album since In the Long Grass in 1984. In March 2020, they released a new album, Citizens of Boomtown, and a lead single, "Trash Glam Baby".

In 2025 The Boomtown Rats reformed for a 12-date, 50th anniversary tour of the UK. A two-album compilation on vinyl and CD, The First 50 Years: Songs of Boomtown Glory, was released on 19 September 2025.

== Band members ==
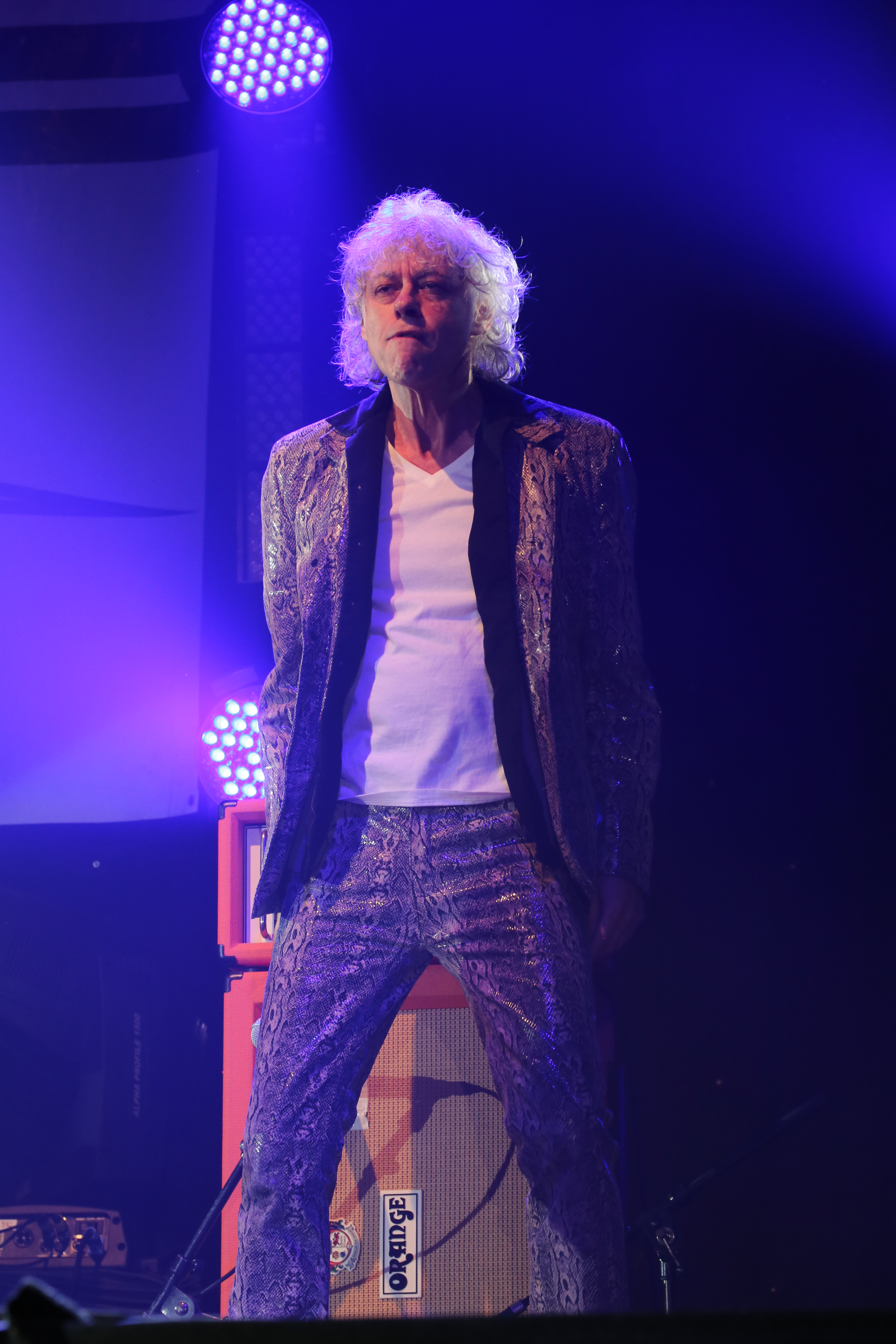
Geldof

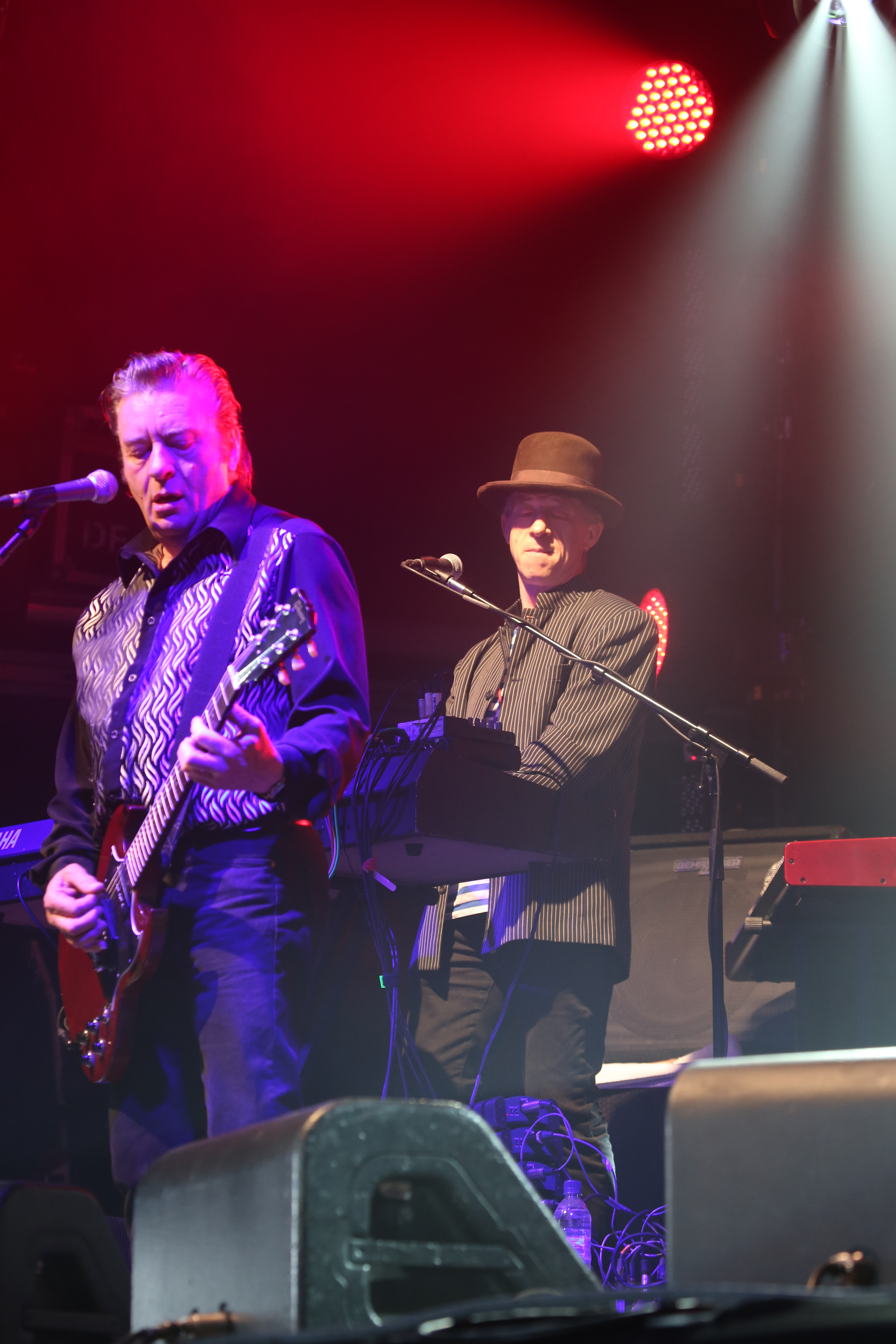
Roberts and Dunn

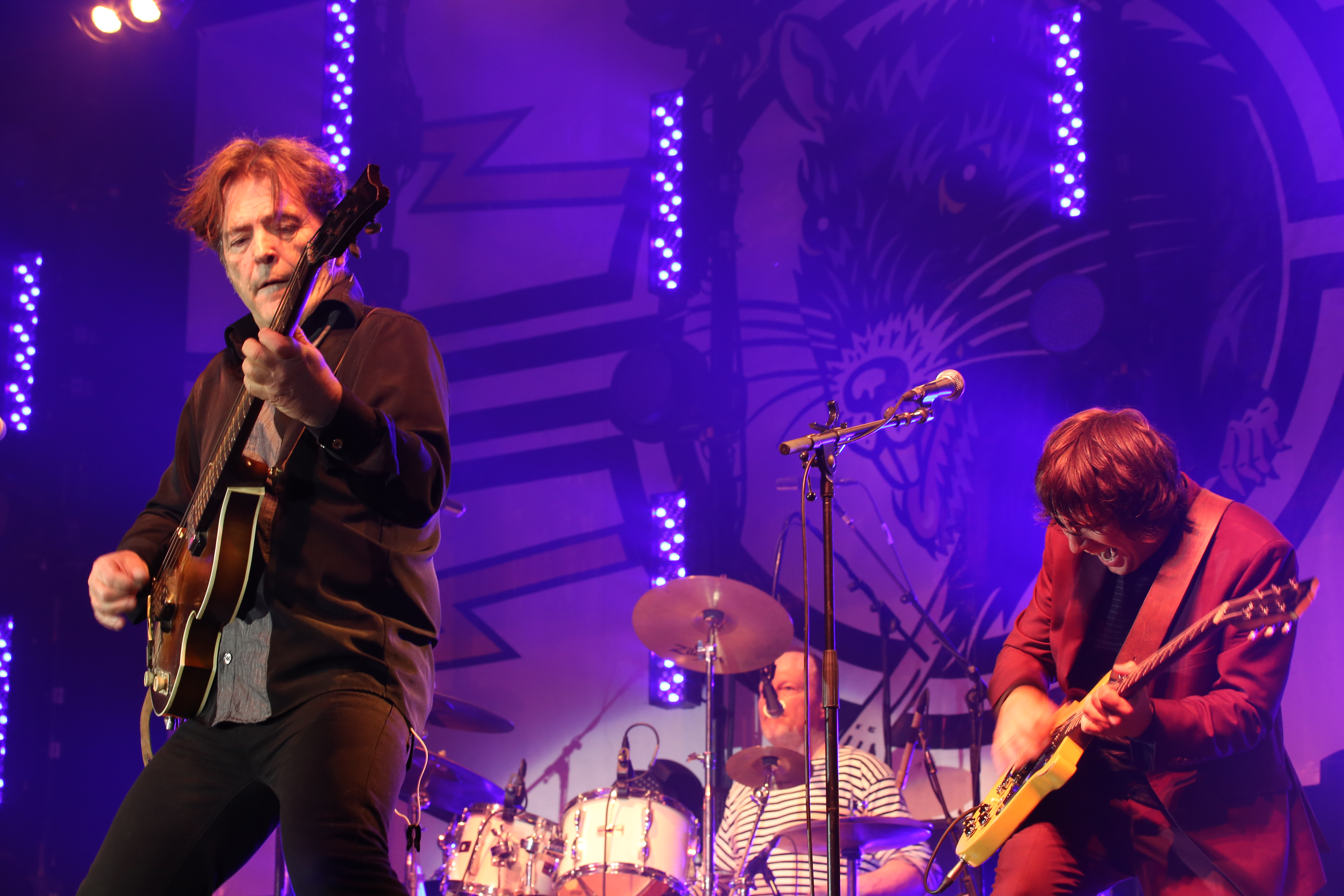
Briquette, Crowe and Beale

Current

- Bob Geldof – lead vocals, guitar, harmonica, saxophone (1975–1986, 2013–present)
- Pete Briquette – bass, keyboards, backing vocals (1975–1986, 2013–present)
- Simon Crowe – drums, percussion, backing vocals (1975–1986, 2013–present)

with

- Alan Dunn – piano, keyboards, backing vocals (2013–present)
- Darren Beale – rhythm guitar, keyboards, backing vocals (2013–present)
- Paul Cuddeford – lead guitar, backing vocals (2022–present)
- Steve 'Smiley' Barnard – drums, backing vocals (2025–present)

Former

- Garry Roberts – lead guitar, backing vocals (1975–1986, 2013–2022; his death)
- Johnnie Fingers – keyboards, piano, backing vocals (1975–1986)
- Gerry Cott – rhythm guitar (1975–1981)

Timeline

== Discography ==
=== Studio albums ===
- The Boomtown Rats (1977)
- A Tonic for the Troops (1978)
- The Fine Art of Surfacing (1979)
- Mondo Bongo (1981)
- V Deep (1982)
- In the Long Grass (1984)
- Citizens of Boomtown (2020)

=== UK Top 40 singles ===
- "Lookin' After No. 1" (1977) No. 11
- "Mary of the 4th Form" (1977) No. 15
- "She's So Modern" (1978) No. 12
- "Like Clockwork" (1978) No. 6
- "Rat Trap" (1978) No. 1
- "I Don't Like Mondays" (1979) No. 1
- "Diamond Smiles" (1979) No. 13
- "Someone's Looking at You" (1980) No. 4
- "Banana Republic" (1980) No. 3
- "The Elephant's Graveyard (Guilty)" (1981) No. 26
- "House on Fire" (1982) No. 24
- "I Don't Like Mondays" (CD single re-issue) (1994) No. 38

== See also ==
- List of one-hit wonders in the United States
