= Garry Roberts =

Irish guitarist and sound engineer (1950–2022)

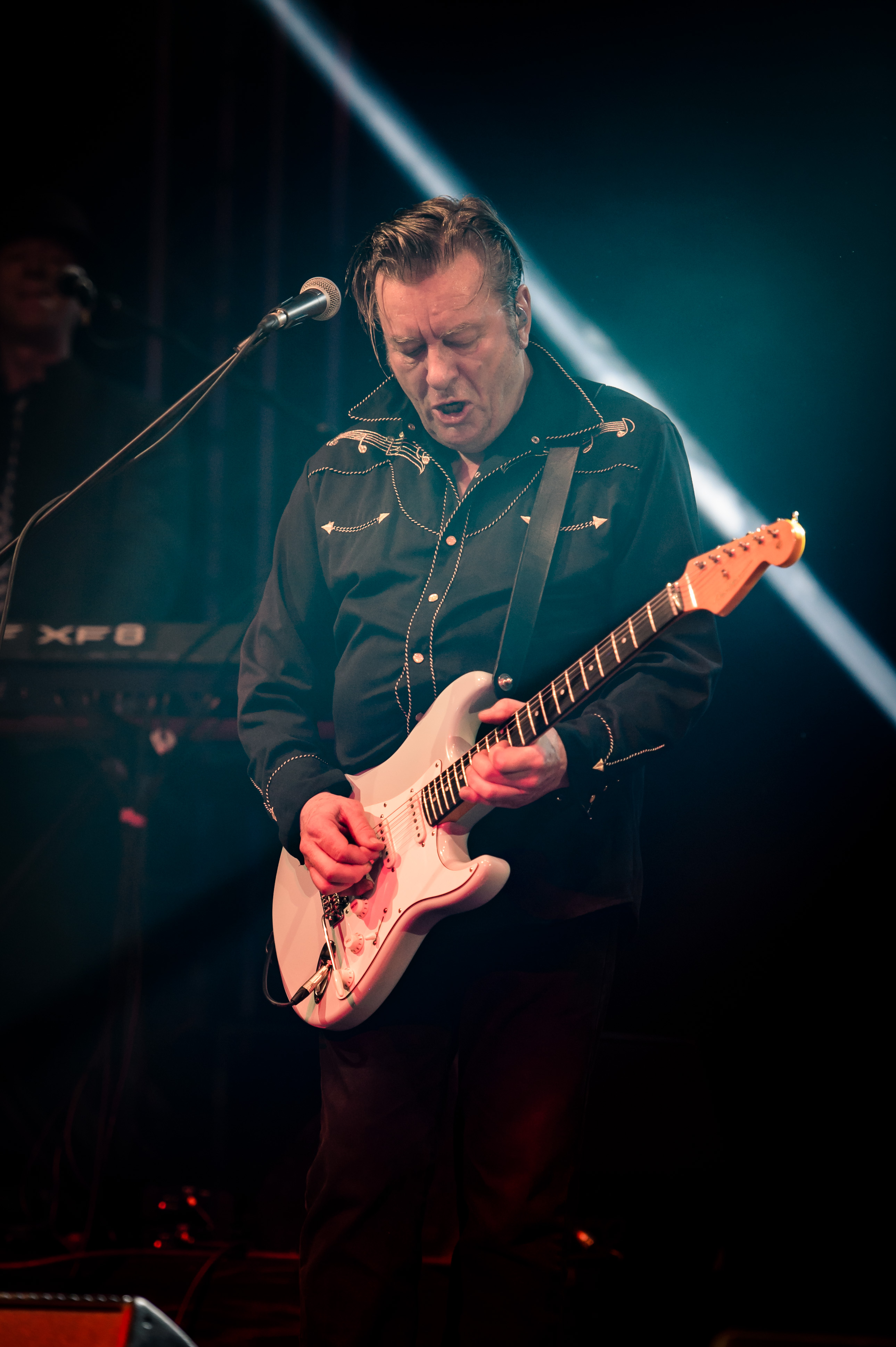
- Roberts performing with The Boomtown Rats in 2017.

Background information
- Birth name: Garrick Roberts
- Born: 16 June 1950; Dublin, County Dublin, Leinster, Ireland
- Died: 9 November 2022 (aged 72)
- Genres: Rock
- Instrument: Guitar
- Formerly of: The Boomtown Rats

Garrick Roberts (16 June 1950 – 9 November 2022) was an Irish musician best known as the lead guitarist with The Boomtown Rats, a band which came into being in 1976. He and Johnnie Fingers (Moylett) had decided to put a band together and, between them, they recruited the other four members, Pete Briquette (bass), Gerry Cott (guitar), Simon Crowe (drums), and singer Bob Geldof.

== Career ==
Roberts was a founder and the lead guitarist of the band The Boomtown Rats, which came into being in 1976. After The Boomtown Rats disbanded in 1986, Roberts worked as a live sound engineer with a number of bands, including Simply Red, Orchestral Manoeuvres in the Dark and Flesh For Lulu. After having worked successfully as an Independent Financial Adviser for fifteen years, he had become disillusioned with the life insurance industry and became a central heating engineer to keep himself occupied between gigs. He avoided playing the guitar in public for ten years, after which he and Simon Crowe played together for four years in the rhythm and blues four-piece band The Velcro Flies. In 2008, Roberts and Crowe, with Darren Beale on second lead guitar and Peter Barton on bass guitar and lead vocals, began playing together as The Rats, performing material from the first three Boomtown Rats albums across Europe and the UK. He also ran guitar workshop in schools, introducing children to the electric guitar, basic techniques and a brief history of pop and rock a In 2013, Roberts and Crowe both joined a reunited Boomtown Rats lineup, touring internationally and releasing the 2020 album Citizens Of Boomtown.

== Personal life ==
Roberts lived in Bromyard, Herefordshire. He died on 9 November 2022, at the age of 72.
