= Gerry Cott =

- Born: 15 October 1954 (age 71); Dublin, Ireland
- Genres: Rock, folk rock, electronic rock
- Formerly of: The Boomtown Rats

Gerry Cott (born 15 October 1954, in Dublin, Ireland) is an Irish guitarist and songwriter, who was a co-founder of the Irish new wave band The Boomtown Rats. He started playing flamenco guitar when he was 11 years old. In 1966 he saw Bob Dylan performing live in Dublin and the experience influenced him radically.

Cott left The Boomtown Rats in 1981, prior to the recording of the band's fifth album V Deep. In 1984 he released the five-song album I Left My Hat in Haiti that included the single "Alphabet Town". "Alphabet Town" hit the Canadian charts, peaking at #90 during a 9-week run near the end of 1984.

As of 2008, Cott was working as an animal trainer and animal action supervisor in films and television with his company A-Z Animals. He was also, reportedly, writing a book.

In 2010, Cott released a solo acoustic guitar album Urban Soundscapes

On 20 September 2011, Cott performed live on stage with Bob Geldof at the Cadogan Hall in Sloane Square, London for the last three songs of the set. According to Geldof, it was the first time the two had been on the stage together in over 30 years.
