= Simon Crowe =

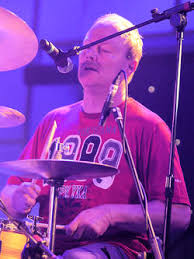

Background information
- Born: Simon Crowe; 1952 or 1953 (age 73–74); Dublin, Ireland
- Genres: New wave; punk; pop rock
- Occupation: Drummer
- Years active: 1975–present
- Labels: Mulligan; Ensign; Mercury; Columbia
- Member of: The Boomtown Rats

Simon Crowe (born 1952 or 1953, Dublin, Ireland) is an Irish musician, best known as the drummer and backing vocalist of the Irish new wave band The Boomtown Rats.

The Boomtown Rats, originally known as the "Nightlife Thugs", was formed in 1975. The band had eighteen hit singles in the UK in the 1970s and early 1980s. After the Boomtown Rats broke up, in 1986, Crowe lived in Devon for several years. While in Devon, he played with the Exeter-based folk group Jiggerypipery.

Crowe was also part of The Velcro Flies (with ex-Boomtown Rat Garry Roberts) and Gung~Ho (with ex-Boomtown Rat Johnny Fingers). He subsequently formed a group, The Rats, with Roberts. As of 2009, The Rats featured Roberts on guitar and Crowe on drums, with Pete Briquette on bass and Darren Beale on lead guitar. Bob Geldof did not (re)join the group as, according to Crowe, he was "doing his own thing".

The Boomtown Rats reformed, with an original line-up that included Geldof, Briquette, Roberts and Crowe, in 2013.
