= Pete Briquette =

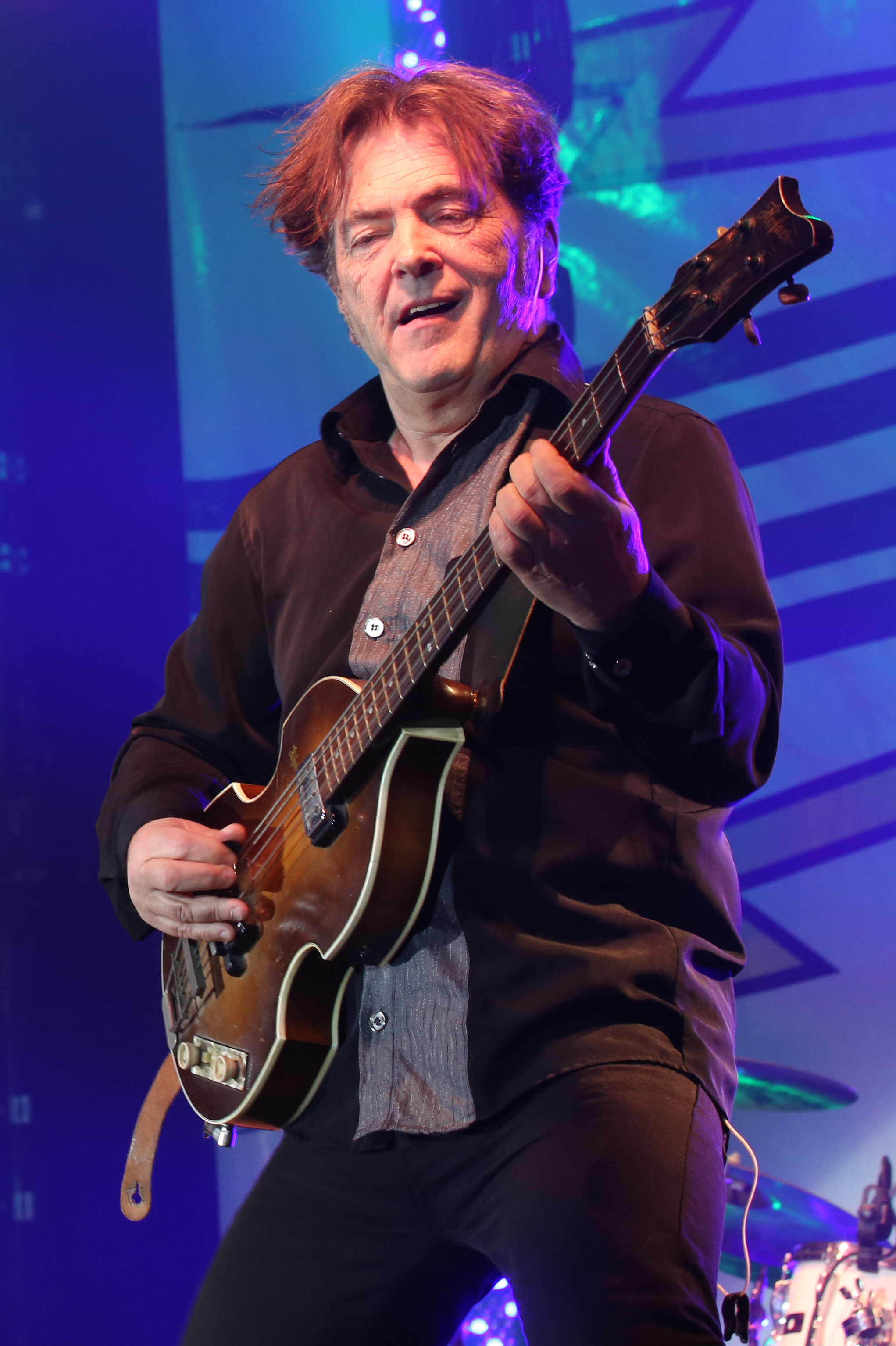
- Briquette in 2014

Background information
- Born: Patrick Cusack; 2 July 1954 (age 71); Ballyjamesduff, County Cavan, Ireland
- Genres: New wave; punk rock
- Occupations: Bassist; record producer; composer
- Instruments: Bass guitar; keyboards
- Member of: The Boomtown Rats

Patrick Martin Cusack (born 2 July 1954), known by the stage name Pete Briquette, is an Irish bassist, record producer and composer. He is a member of the Boomtown Rats and has also played in Bob Geldof's band.

== Boomtown Rats ==
He was born in Ballyjamesduff, County Cavan, Ireland. His father ran a solicitor's practice in the town. His stage name refers to his upbringing in Ireland where peat briquettes were burned for heat instead of coal.

He is the bass guitarist, backing vocalist, occasional songwriter, and sometime keyboardist for The Boomtown Rats, a band that reached worldwide popularity in the late 1970s. His bass lines are evident on such Boomtown Rats songs as "Rat Trap", "Banana Republic" and "Like Clockwork", the last two of which he co-wrote with Bob Geldof. Briquette was the only Rats member who frequently collaborated with Geldof as a solo artist, playing on some of his biggest hits such as "Great Song of Indifference" and "Love or Something".

== Record producer ==
Briquette also works as a record producer and produced the French singer Renaud's 2009 album of Irish ballads Molly Malone – Balade Irlandaise which includes contributions from Terry Woods (The Pogues), Barney McKenna (The Dubliners) and Glen Hansard. Though criticised for the quality of Renaud's voice, the album was commercially successful reaching number one on the French chart.

== Personal life ==
Briquette is a first cousin of Johnnie Fingers, the main keyboardist in the Boomtown Rats, as their mothers, Margaret "Peggy" (Bowles) Cusack and Cecilia "Sheila" (Bowles) Moylett, were sisters. They are nephews of Irish conductor and composer Michael Bowles. He is the younger brother of Annette Andrews (née Cusack), the wife of former Irish Minister for Foreign Affairs David Andrews. He currently lives in Acton, London, England. Briquette is the uncle of comedian David McSavage and Barry Andrews (politician).
