= Johnnie Fingers =

Irish musician (born 1956)

- Born: John Peter Moylett; 10 September 1956 (age 70); Dublin, Ireland
- Genre: Rock
- Occupation: Musician
- Instruments: Keyboards
- Formerly of: The Boomtown Rats

John Peter Moylett (born 10 September 1956), known professionally as Johnnie Fingers, is an Irish keyboardist and co-founding member of the new wave band the Boomtown Rats. He was notable for his attire of striped pyjamas on stage and his melodic piano style. Though uncredited as such for decades, Fingers was the co-author of the Boomtown Rats' 1979 hit "I Don't Like Mondays"; in 2019 (after legal action) Fingers received a financial settlement and credit for having co-written the song.

== Background ==
Fingers came from a large family of actors, artists and musicians. His cousin is his fellow Boomtown Rat Pete Briquette, as their mothers, Margaret "Peggy" (Bowles) Cusack and Cecilia "Sheila" (Bowles) Moylett, were sisters. They are nephews of Irish conductor and composer Michael Bowles. He learned the piano from a young age from "Miss Grist" who he claims "stole his youth". After the demise of the Boomtown Rats in 1986, he founded Gung~Ho with his fellow Boomtown Rats member Simon Crowe and Yoko Kurokawa in 1987. Fingers is now married with two children. Fingers decided to not return to the Boomtown Rats when the band was reunited in 2013, as he lives in Tokyo.

== Career ==
He currently lives in Tokyo, Japan, where he continues to work in the music industry. Apart from producing and writing music for Japanese stars such as UA, and theme songs such as for the hit anime B't X, Fingers is the "point man" with the concert music production company Smash Japan, producers of Fuji Rock Festival, the largest music festival in Japan.

== Discography ==
=== With Gung~ho ===
- "Play To Win" (single, 1987)
- 10 (1988)

=== With Greengate ===
- "Daydreaming" – Vinyl 7"
- Metaphysical Vibration – CD

=== With Ruffy Tuffy ===
- Ruffy Tuffy (1999) album
- Respect! (2000) omnibus Live album
- Natsu no Jujika (2000) album
- Aki no Jujika (2000) album
- Mizu no Awa (2001) EP
