= Claire Bertschinger =

Anglo-Swiss nurse

Dame Claire Bertschinger DBE DL (born 1953) is an Anglo-Swiss nurse and advocate on behalf of suffering people in the developing world. Her work in Ethiopia in 1984 inspired Band Aid and subsequently Live Aid, the biggest relief programme ever mounted. Bertschinger received the Florence Nightingale Medal in 1991 for her work in nursing, and was made a Dame by Queen Elizabeth II in 2010 for "services to Nursing and to International Humanitarian Aid".

== Biography ==
The daughter of a Swiss father and British mother, Bertschinger was brought up in Sheering near Bishop's Stortford, Essex.

Owing to dyslexia, she could barely read or write until she was 14. After her parents got a television in the 1960s, one of the first films she watched was The Inn of the Sixth Happiness starring Ingrid Bergman playing the role of Gladys Aylward, an English missionary to China in the 1930s who is caught up in the Japanese invasion. Bertschinger thought: "I could do that. That's what I want to do." She graduated from Brunel University with an MSc degree in Medical Anthropology in 1997.

Bertschinger is a Buddhist, practising Nichiren Buddhism. She became a member of the global Buddhist organization Soka Gakkai International in 1994.

Her autobiographical book, Moving Mountains, was published in 2005. The book describes her global experiences and her spiritual motivation that led her to Buddhism. Part of the royalties from the book go to The African Children's Educational Trust, a British charity.

=== Career ===
After training and working as a nurse in the UK, Bertschinger became a medic on Operation Drake, an expedition with Colonel John Blashford-Snell and the Scientific Exploration Society in Panama, Papua New Guinea and Sulawesi.

After this experience, she joined the emergency disaster relief group of the International Committee of the Red Cross (ICRC), allowed to attend war locations thanks to her dual-nationality. Through this she has worked in over a dozen zones of conflict including Afghanistan, Kenya, Lebanon, Sudan, Sierra Leone, Ivory Coast and Liberia. She also worked at ICRC headquarters in Geneva, Switzerland as training officer in the Health Division.

Bertschinger is an ambassador and Trustee for The African Children's Educational Trust, Patron for Promise Nepal, and a voluntary worker for the charity Age UK.

In 2010, Bertschinger was appointed a Dame Commander of the British Empire by Queen Elizabeth II in the New Year Honours List, for services to Nursing and to International Humanitarian Aid. Bertschinger was made a Deputy Lieutenant of Hertfordshire in 2012.

As of 2024, she has retired from her position as Director for the Diploma in Tropical Nursing course at the London School of Hygiene and Tropical Medicine. She is now an Honorary Assistant Professor with the London School of Hygiene and Tropical Medicine.

=== Ethiopia ===
In 1984, Bertschinger was working as an ICRC field nurse located in Mekele, the capital of Tigray Province, Ethiopia during the famine of 1984. She ran a feeding centre that could only accept 60 to 70 new children at a time when thousands more were in need of food. As a young nurse, she had to decide who would and would not receive food. Those she could not help had little hope of survival, and when interviewed about the pain of having to make such critical decisions, she said "I felt like a Nazi commandant, deciding who would live and who would die. Playing God broke my heart."

When a BBC News crew appeared with reporter Michael Buerk, Bertschinger gladly told her story to highlight the problems. While Buerk thought Bertschinger was a hero, and edited his report to highlight this, Bertschinger said that her first impression of Buerk was that of an "arrogant 'prat' who asked 'irrelevant questions'", but subsequently acknowledged "I can look back and I think his reports got the right answers."

Buerk's initial news report on Bertschinger's work, which was broadcast on 23 October 1984, inspired the watching Bob Geldof to launch Band Aid. This was followed by Live Aid in 1985, the biggest relief programme ever mounted, which raised more than £150m and saved an estimated 2m lives in Africa.

In 2004, Bertschinger returned to Ethiopia with Buerk, to assess the situation 20 years on to make the programme Ethiopia: A Journey with Michael Buerk. After that visit, Bertschinger said "Education is the key to the future for resource-poor settings. It opens doors and it radically improves people's health, particularly for women."

== Awards ==
- 1986: Bish Medal from the Scientific Exploration Society
- 1991: Florence Nightingale Medal from the International Committee of the Red Cross
- 2005: Women of the Year, Window to the World Award
- 2007: Human Rights and Nursing Awards 2007, from the International Centre for Nursing Ethics (ICNE), in the Faculty of Health and Medical Sciences at the University of Surrey
- 2008: Honorary degree of Doctor of Social Sciences, Brunel University
- 2010: Voted one of the Top 20 Most Influential People in the Nursing Field by Masters in Nursing Online
- 2010: Dame Commander of the Order of the British Empire (DBE) in the 2010 New Year Honours
- 2010: Honorary degree of Doctor of Education, Robert Gordon University
- 2010: Honorary degree of Doctor of Health Sciences, Anglia Ruskin University
- 2011: Honorary degree of Doctor of Staffordshire University
- 2011: Honorary degree of Doctor of Science, De Montfort University
- 2012: Voted one of the Five formidable women who shaped the Red Cross by the British Red Cross
- 2012: Voted one of The 10 most influential female nurses of all time by Scrubs Magazine
- 2012: Deputy Lieutenant of Hertfordshire
- 2013: BBC's 100 women
