= Education in Africa =

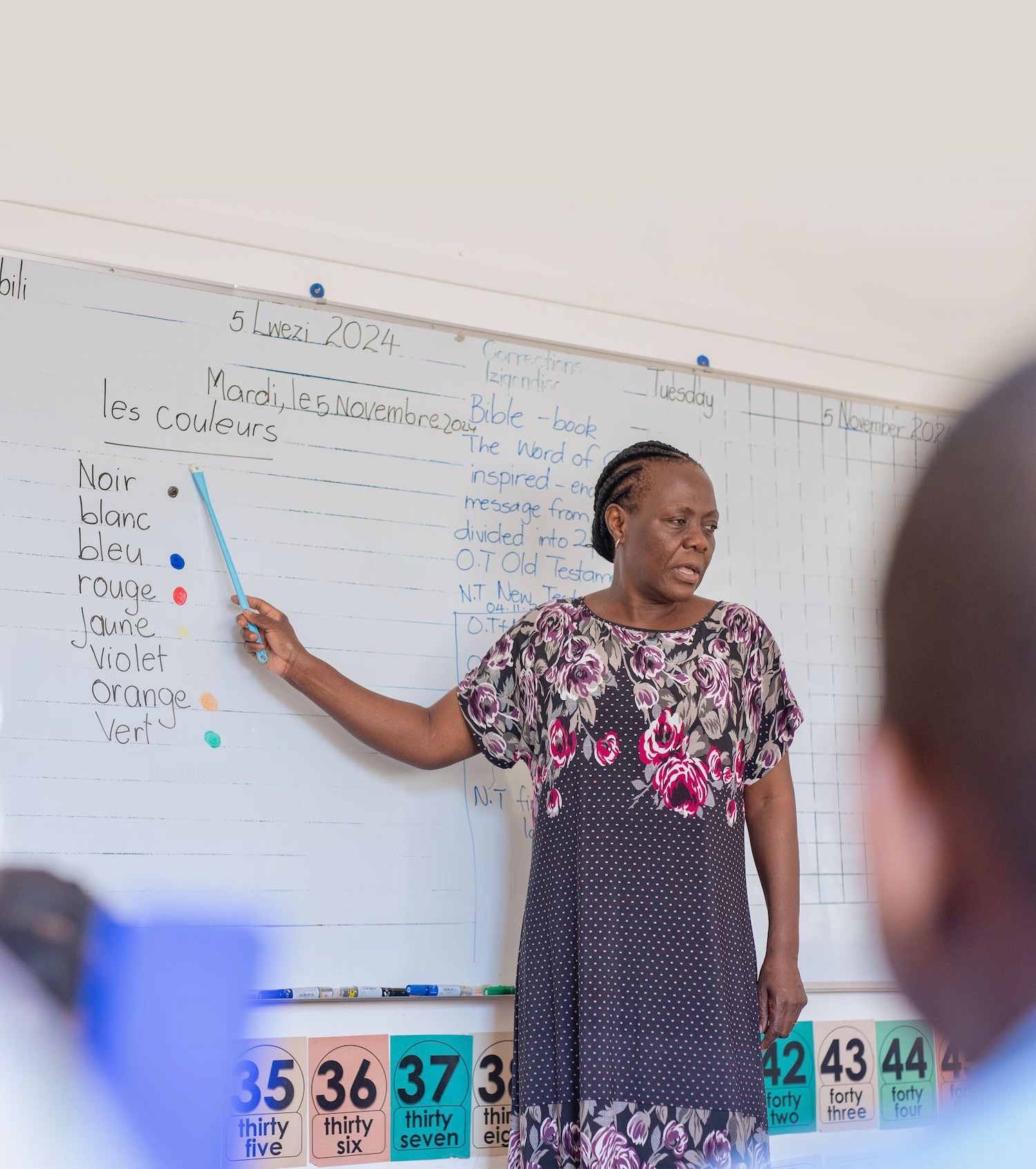
A teacher instructs a French lesson in Zimbabwe.

Education in Africa can be divided primarily into pre-colonial and post-colonial influences. European-style schooling systems took a primary focus during heavy colonial influences in Africa. Particularly in West and Central Africa, education has been characterized by traditional teaching balanced with a European-style schooling systems residual of the continent's colonial past.

Education in modern African societies is influenced by colonialism, neocolonialism, and political instability caused by armed conflicts across the continent. Additionally, the lack of effective education strategies aligned with global and civilizational challenges, including the pressures of globalization, has further hindered progress.

Although the quality of education, as well as the number of well-equipped schools and qualified teachers, has been steadily increasing since the beginning of the colonial period, evidence of inequality still exists in educational systems based on region, economic status, race, and gender.

== List of African countries by level of literacy ==
The following table uses information gathered by the CIA World Factbook. Unless otherwise noted, a country's reported literacy rate reflects the percentage of people aged 15 years and over who can read and write.

Countries	Total population	Male	Female	Year	Notes
Algeria	81.4%	87.4%	75.3%	2018	
Angola	71.1%	82.6%	62.4%	2015	
Benin	45.8%	56.9%	35%	2021	
Botswana	88.5%	88%	88.9%	2015	
Burkina Faso	46%	54.5%	37.8%	2021	
Burundi	74.7%	81.3%	68.4%	2021	
Cabo Verde	90.8%	94.2%	87.4%	2021	
Cameroon	77.1%	82.6%	71.6%	2018	
Central African Republic	37.4%	49.5%	25.8%	2018	
Chad	26.8%	35.4%	18.2%	2021	Ages 15 and over can read and write French or Arabic.
Comoros	62%	67%	56.9%	2021	
Congo, Democratic Republic of the	80%	89.5%	70.8%	2021	Ages 15 and over can read and write French, Lingala, Kingwana, or Tshiluba.
Congo, Republic of the	80.6%	85.9%	75.4%	2021	
Cote d'Ivoire	89.9%	93.1%	86.7%	2019	
Egypt	73.1%	78.8%	67.4%	2021	
Equatorial Guinea	95.3%	97.4%	93%	2015	
Eritrea	76.6%	84.4%	68.9%	2018	
Eswatini	88.4%	88.3%	88.5%	2018	
Ethiopia	51.8%	57.2%	44.4%	2017	
Gabon	85.5%	86.2%	84.7%	2021	
Gambia, The	58.1%	65.2%	51.2%	2021	
Ghana	79%	83.5%	74.5%	2018	
Guinea	45.3%	61.2%	31.3%	2021	
Guinea-Bissau	52.9%	67%	39.9%	2021	
Kenya	82.6%	85.5%	79.8%	2021	
Lesotho	81%	72.9%	88.8%	2021	
Liberia	48.3%	62.7%	34.1%	2017	
Libya	91%	96.7%	85.6%	2015	
Madagascar	77.3%	78.8%	75.8%	2021	
Malawi	67.3%	71.2%	63.7%	2021	
Mali	35.5%	46.2%	25.7%	2018	
Mauritania	67%	71.8%	62.2%	2021	
Mauritius	92.2%	93.5%	90.5%	2021	
Morocco	75.9%	84.8%	67.4%	2021	Does not include data from the former Western Sahara.
Mozambique	63.4%	74.1%	53.8%	2021	
Namibia	92.3%	90.6%	92.3%	2021	
Niger	37.3%	45.8%	29%	2018	
Nigeria	62%	71.3%	52.7%	2021	
Rwanda	75.9%	78.7%	73.3%	2021	
Sao Tome and Principe	94.8%	96.5%	91.1%	2021	
Senegal	56.3%	68.4%	45.4%	2021	
Seychelles	95.9%	95.4%	96.4%	2018	
Sierra Leone	48.6%	56.3%	41.3%	2022	Ages 15 and over can read and write English, Mende, Temne, or Arabic.
South Africa	95%	95.5%	94.5%	2019	
South Sudan	34.5%	40.3%	28.9%	2018	
Sudan	60.7%	65.4%	56.1%	2018	
Tanzania	81.8%	85.5%	78.2%	2021	Ages 15 and over can read and write Kiswahili (Swahili), English, or Arabic.
Togo	66.5%	80%	55.1%	2019	
Tunisia	82.7%	89.1%	82.7%	2021	
Uganda	79%	84%	74.3%	2021	
Zambia	86.7%	90.6%	83.1%	2018	
Zimbabwe	89.7%	88.3%	90.9%	2021	Any person age 15 and above who completed at least grade 3 of primary education.

== History ==
=== Education in pre-colonial Africa ===
Pre-colonial Africa was made up of ethnic groups and states that embarked on migrations depending on seasons, the availability of fertile soil, and political circumstances. Households and ethnic groups usually organized power around property on the basis of primogeniture. Households were largely economically independent. In much of pre-colonial Africa, formally organized education was unnecessary, but state-organized formal schools existed among Sahelian kingdoms in West Africa.

Education in many pre-colonial African states was in the form of apprenticeship, a form of informal education where children and younger members of each household learned from older members of their household and community. In most cases, each household member learned more than one skill, in addition to learning the values, socialization, and norms of the community, tribe, and household. Some common skills included dancing, farming, fishing, winemaking, cooking (mostly for females), and hunting. Some people in pre-colonial Africa also learned how to practice herbal medicine, and how to carve stools, masks, and other furniture.

Storytelling also played a significant role for education in pre-colonial Africa. Parents, older members of households, and griots used oral storytelling to teach children about the history, norms, and values of their state, household, and community.

Festivals and rituals were also used as means to teach the history of their region or state. Rituals were mainly used to teach young adults about the responsibilities and expectations of adulthood, such as teaching women how to cook and care for a household, and teaching men how to hunt or farm. Dipo, a rite of passage in Ghana, is used to teach young girls about cooking, motherhood, and other necessary skills and values before they marry. Domba is a Venda rite of passage for both girls and boys held after their puberty rituals, following which they enter adulthood. It lasted for 9-12 months and involved them working for a sponsor (chief or headman) in the day, and having lessons (milayo) in the night. Milayo were taught by ritual specialists via proverbs, riddles, dances, physical exercise, songs, and dramas, with figurines used as teaching aids.

In Egypt, one of the first convenient mediums for retaining accurate information, papyrus, was used to develop systems for learning and developing new ideas. Early examples of higher education in Africa were the School of Holy Scriptures in Ethiopia and Al-Azhar in Egypt. These schools became global cultural and academic centers. Al-Azhar University in Cairo, Egypt, founded around 970–972 CE, is recognized as one of the oldest institutions of higher learning in the world.

=== Colonial and Post-colonial Periods ===
The colonial period, beginning in the 19th century, began to replace traditional African education with formal European styles. Colonial powers did not view investing in African education as a practical use of their revenue or refrained from educating Africans to avoid uprisings. Those in positions of authority were specifically afraid of widespread access to higher education among the native populations.

A 2021 study found that colonial education systems may also have had some positive effects on education levels in Africa, namely on numeracy. Numeracy in Africa had accelerated since the 1830s but increased during the late 19th and the first two decades of the 20th century.

Between the 1950s and 1990s, African countries regained their independence from colonial powers and many experienced resurgence in traditional forms of education, which coexisted with formally structured education.

Post-colonial African states were largely developing countries in need of international support. In the 1960s, (known as the First Development Decade by the UN), policymakers prioritized secondary and tertiary education, then on universal primary education around 1980. Although children and adults may learn from their families and community, formal schooling is also prevalent. African education programs have evolved to include both types. For example, an HIV/AIDS awareness program may involve members visiting communities to share their knowledge.

=== French Colonial Africa ===
Education as a tool of colonization was widespread throughout the French Colonial Empire. Hubert Lyautey, the first Resident-General of French Morocco, advocated for the facilitation of ruling and conquest through cooperation with native elites. To facilitate the relationship with this "bourgeois" class of francophone Africans, selective educational institutions were established across the French Empire.

The teaching of the French language in Moroccan institutions of higher education, such as the University of Fez, was intended to "promote economic development and political compliance without assimilating or deracinating the students or preparing them for political agency." This system allowed colonial authorities to educate a class of native Moroccans that could carry out administrative roles and functions, to assist in the administration and exploitation of the protectorate for as long as possible.

Students were given a predetermined curriculum in classrooms. The basic goal of this classroom practice was to provide only a limited selection of information for students, leaving very little margin for questioning or critical thinking. Only a limited number of families were permitted to send their children to school, which fit with the underlying goal of creating an exclusive class of native-born Moroccans who would serve as a sort of liaison between white colonial officials and the masses.

=== British Colonial Africa ===
Education in British Colonial Africa can be characterized by three primary phases. The first of these is from the end of the 19th century until the outbreak of the First World War, then the Interwar Period, and finally, the conclusion of the Second World War until independence.

From the late 19th century until the First World War, British colonial education in Africa was largely carried out by missionaries at mission schools. Although these schools were founded with religious intent, they played a significant role in the early colonial machine. Much like in French Colonial Africa, British colonists sought out English-speaking natives who could serve as liaisons between them and the native population; however, this was done far more out of economic incentives than political ones. As the demand for English-speaking Africans increased, mission schools provided training in the form of teaching of the Bible. As time went on, however, British industrialists began to complain about the lack of skilled labor. As such, the British Government supplied mission schools with grants for the vocational training of Africans in various trades critical to British industrial efforts.

British colonial education in Africa during the Interwar Period can be characterized by a push for uniformity despite colonial authorities demonstrating their acute awareness of the notable differences between the different regions of the Empire. Critical to this, as well, was the universal recognition of nationality as a basic human right under the Covenant of the League of Nations. Colonies were, as outlined by the League of Nations, to be eventually granted independence, with the European powers entrusted as the stewards of "civilization" for their respective colonies. Colonies were only allowed independence once they could demonstrate their capacity for self-rule. Governor General of Nigeria (1914–1919) Lord Lugard's 1922 book The Dual Mandate in British Tropical Africa states:

"...do not enter the tropics on sufferance, or employ their technical skill, their energy, and their capital as 'interlopers' or as 'greedy capitalists', but in the fulfillment of the Mandate of civilization".

In 1923, the British Government established the Advisory Committee on Education in British Tropical Africa (with the word tropical removed to broaden its jurisdiction). With its establishment, the colonial authority would, for the first time, uniformly administer its educational goals across all British African colonies. Programs begun under the new committee were aimed at increasing the "self-sufficiency" of village economies and providing community incentives to counteract flight into big cities. Educational practices under this committee came to be known as 'adapted,' as it was sought to adjust Western education to the contemporary European understanding of the 'African Mind' as inherently different; education was often administered through local contexts and practices, all the while teaching western curricula. In his essay British Colonial Education in Africa: Policy and Practice in the Era of Trusteeship, Aaron Windel of Bowdoin College describes it as such:

"Typical lessons in a village school operating on adapted principles focused on hygiene, vernacular word building, drill, and basic local geography. Ideally, lessons would be taught on the principle of 'teach by doing' and would include objects from village life. One geography lesson used a bicycle pump, a pail of water, and a small gourd to simulate a ship carrying sugar from India and caught in a monsoon. Adapted pedagogy could also include dramatizations of 'African tribal histories' or special holiday plays with an African focus".

Most British officials (including Lord Lugard) believed that trusteeship would continue for many generations to come, and the goals of 'civilizing' the native population began to take precedence. Treatment of colonial subjects continued to vary wildly as determined by race, and white settlers were continuously given preferential treatment in the distribution of land and opportunities for careers, among other benefits.

The British education system proved to be quite effective. A 2021 study observed a positive effect of British colonization on education levels. Areas that were influenced by the British education system showed a rapid increase in numeracy. For example, in South Africa, where the colonial education and political system switched from Dutch to British in 1806, the increase in numeracy has been rapid since the early 19th century. The reliance on local resources and languages in education and missionaries largely being run by Africans seems to have had a positive impact.

As British-administered schools took shape during the Interwar Period, many independent schools emerged which focused on literacy and offered alternative curricula. Such schools were thought of as a threat to the colonial system, and colonial governments were worried that these so-called 'outlaw' schools would instill thoughts of subversion and anti-colonialism in the native populations. One such independent school was formed in Kenya among the Kikuyu and made English its language of instruction, with the ultimate goal of enabling the Kikuyu to fight for land property rights in colonial legal and administrative bodies. Over time, as anti-colonial sentiment gained momentum, independent schools were increasingly viewed by the colonial government as breeding grounds for freedom fighters and independence advocates, which culminated in their banning in 1952 as part of the Mau Mau Emergency.

== Education in postcolonial Africa ==
In 2000, the United Nations adopted the Millennium Development Goals (MDGs), a set of development goals for the year 2015. A specific MDG is "to ensure that by 2015, children everywhere, boys and girls alike, will be able to complete a full course of primary schooling." That same year, the World Education Forum met in Dakar, Senegal, and adopted the Dakar Framework for Action that reaffirms the commitment to achieving education for all by 2015.

At the time, according to UNESCO, only 57% of African children were enrolled in primary schools, the lowest enrollment rate of any region surveyed. The report also showed marked gender inequalities. In almost all countries, the enrollment of boys far outpaced that of girls. However, in some countries, education was relatively strong. In Zimbabwe, literacy had reached 92%.

Steps such as abolishing school fees, investing in teaching infrastructure and resources, and providing more school meals from the World Food Programme helped increase enrollment by millions. Despite the significant progress of many countries, the world fell short of meeting its goal of Universal Primary Education (UPE). In sub-Saharan Africa as of 2013, only about 79% of primary school-age children were enrolled in school. 59 million children of primary-school age were out of school, and enrollment of girls continued to lag behind that of boys. The disparity between genders is partially due to girls being excluded from school during pregnancy.

Following the expiration of the MDGs in 2015, the UN adopted a set of Sustainable Development Goals for the year 2030. The fourth goal addressed education, aiming to "ensure inclusive and equitable quality education and promote lifelong learning opportunities for all." The World Education Forum also convened in Incheon, Korea, to discuss the implementation of this goal and adopt the Incheon Declaration for Education 2030. Data reflecting the effects that the latest measures have had on education participation in African countries is not readily available. Many underlying causes deter progress toward education equity, such as high attrition rates of students, teacher shortages, poor infrastructure and supplies, limited access to education for rural and remote areas, stigmas surrounding marginalized groups, among many others.

=== Language ===
Due to high linguistic diversity, the legacy of colonialism, and the need for knowledge of international languages such as English and French in employment and higher education, most schooling in Africa takes place in languages that teachers and pupils do not speak natively and, in some cases, do not understand. Fewer than 20% of children in francophone Africa are taught in their home language. There is considerable evidence that pupils schooled in a second language achieve poorer results than those schooled in their mother tongue, as a lack of proficiency in the second language impairs understanding and encourages ineffective rote learning. There is also evidence to show that children taught in a second language are less likely to complete their education. Although UNESCO has recommended since the 1950s that children be taught in their mother tongue for at least the first six years, progressing later to other languages, not all African countries implement this effectively. Even where the earliest grades are taught in the mother tongue, pupils are typically forced to switch to languages such as English and French before acquiring proficiency in these languages. A mapping of countries in Africa found that 31 countries (57%) have adopted bilingual or multilingual education policies, of which 23 countries shift to the second language before grade 5.

=== Lack of proper facilities and educators ===
Another reason for the low education rates in Africa is the lack of proper schooling facilities and unequal opportunities for education across countries. Many schools across Africa find it hard to employ teachers due to the low pay and lack of suitable people. This is particularly true for schools in remote areas. Most people who receive an education would prefer to move to big cities or even overseas, where more opportunities and higher pay await. Thus, there are large class sizes and a high average number of students per teacher in a school. Moreover, the teachers are usually unqualified and have few teaching aids and/or textbook provisions. Due to this, children attending schools in rural areas usually attain poorer results in standardized tests compared to their urban counterparts. This can be seen in the reports given by the Southern and Eastern Africa Consortium for Monitoring Educational Quality (SEACMEQ). Those taking the tests in rural areas score much lower than those in small towns and big cities. This shows a lack of equal education opportunities for children from different parts of the same country.

Studies have shown disparities in teacher qualifications between urban and rural areas, which can impact the learning environment. In one instance, when teachers were given the same test as their students, three-fourths did not achieve a passing score. In addition, studies suggest that students in some regions, particularly rural areas, may face challenges in literacy and numeracy after graduation due to disparities in educational resources compared to urban schools. This can lead to challenges in career advancement compared to their urban counterparts.

=== Emigration ===
Emigration has led to a loss of highly educated people and financial loss. The loss of skilled people is replaced with significant costs; money is lost both educating people who leave and new people to replace them. Even with an almost 5.5% of GDP investment in education in South Africa, the loss makes it difficult for the government to budget another amount in education as other issues are also prioritized such as military budget and debt servicing.

=== Culture ===
Western models and standards continue to dominate African education. Because of colonization, African institutions, particularly universities, still instruct using Eurocentric curriculums with almost no connection to local knowledge systems or everyday life in Africa. This is further perpetuated by the use of European and American imported textbooks.

=== Global water crisis ===
The global water crisis has severe effects on education in rural areas of Africa. Limited access to education and health issues can be further compounded by inadequate water systems or diseases that may follow. Malaria, cited to be a main cause of death in Africa, is a mosquito-borne disease that can commonly be found in unmanaged pools of still water. The mosquitos breed in such pools; consequently, children who drink from these pools can die or fall severely ill. Furthermore, such an intense illness can later affect the cognitive abilities of children who fall ill at a young age. This is applicable biologically and as an effect of falling ill: children who miss a significant amount of school cannot optimize their education due to missing lessons.

=== Military and conflict ===
One effects of war and conflict on education is the diversion of public funds from education to military spending. According to a March 2011 report by UNESCO, armed conflict is the biggest threat to education in Africa. The number of school dropouts across the continent has been increasing dramatically. Twenty-one African countries have been identified as the highest spenders of GDP on their military globally compared to the amount directed toward education. Conflict also leads to the displacement of children, often forcing them to remain in camps or flee to neighboring countries where education is not available.

=== Gender disparity in education ===
There is a high rate of education exclusion in Africa between boys and girls and even between the age groups, especially in sub-Saharan Africa. In sub-Saharan Africa, two out of three girls complete primary school and only four out of ten complete secondary school. (i P )UNESCO. (2022). Global Education Monitoring Report 2022: Gender Report. Page 12.

Some reasons behind this may be poverty, teenage pregnancy, limited gender-sensitive learning materials, and overcrowding, as well as other factors such as late entry into school, heavy workload, HIV/AIDS, gender stereotyping, limited numbers of female teachers, and gender-based violence, among others.

== Influential initiatives ==
The African Union amongst others have taken initiatives to improve education in Africa. The year 2024 has been marked as the "Year of Education". Initiatives to improve education in Africa include:

=== Intracontinental ===
- New Partnership for Africa's Development (NEPAD)'s E-school programme is a plan to provide internet and computer facilities to all schools on the continent.
- The Southern and Eastern Africa Consortium for Monitoring Educational Quality (SEACMEQ) is a consortium of 15 ministries of education in Southern and Eastern Africa that undertakes integrated research and training activities to monitor and evaluate the quality of basic education and generate information decision-makers can use to plan and improve the quality of education.
- For 10 years, the Benin Education Fund (BEF) has provided scholarships and education support to students from the Atakora province in northeastern Benin.

=== International ===
- She's the First is a New York-based non-profit organization. The organization seeks to empower girls in Asia, Africa, and Latin America by facilitating the sponsorship of their education through creative and innovative means.
- Working through local organizations, The African Children's Educational Trust supports thousands of children with long-term scholarships and a community rural elementary school building program.
- British Airways' project, in collaboration with UNICEF, opened the model school Kuje Science Primary School in Nigeria in 2002.
- The Elias Fund provides scholarships to children in Zimbabwe.
- The Ahmadiyya Muslim Community, in association with Humanity First, has built over 500 schools in the African continent and is running a 'learn a skill' initiative for young men and women.
- The Volkswagen Foundation has had a funding initiative called "Knowledge for Tomorrow – Cooperative Research Projects in Sub-Saharan Africa" since 2003. It provides scholarships for young African researchers and helps to establish a scientific community in African universities.
- The McGovern-Dole International Food for Education and Child Nutrition Program is an assistance program in which the United States donates agricultural commodities and money to support school feeding programs in foreign countries, many of which are in Africa.
- UNESCO, in collaboration with UIS, encourages more female role models as teachers.
- The African Union aims to bridge the gap in gender equality through education in its Agenda 2063 by empowering women and girls across Africa.
- The Perivoli Foundation supports early-childhood education across sub-Saharan Africa, training pre-school teachers using recyclable, low-cost materials.
- The Roger Federer Foundation finances education programmes in six countries in Southern Africa, emphasising long-term collaboration with local partners.

== Corruption in education ==
A 2010 Transparency International (TI) report, with research gathered from 8,500 educators and parents in Ghana, Madagascar, Morocco, Niger, Senegal, Sierra Leone and Uganda, found that education is being denied to African children in incredibly large numbers.

A lack of parental involvement, especially as an overseer of government activities, also leads to enormous corruption. This was often found to be because parents and communities feel they lack power regarding their children's education. In Uganda, only 50% of parents believe they have the power to influence decisions regarding their child's education. In Morocco, only 20% of parents thought they held any power.

The unavailability and incompleteness of records in schools and districts prevents the documentation and prevention of corrupt practices. The African Education Watch conducted surveys across the continent and identified the three most common practices of corruption:

- Illegal collection of fees: one part of their research focused on so-called registration fees. Parents from every country surveyed reported paying registration fees even though, by law, primary schooling is free. The portion of parents forced to pay these fees ranged from 9% in Ghana to 90% in Morocco. An average of 44% of parents still report paying skill fees in the study. The average fee costs $4.16, a major expense for families in countries like Madagascar, Niger, and Sierra Leone.
- Embezzlement of school funds: Transparency International's study found that 64% of the schools surveyed on the continent published no financial information at all. Overall, 85% of schools across all countries had either deficient accounting systems or none. The report also found that in many schools, their limited resources were wasted or lost. In Morocco, just 23% of head teachers received training in financial management despite being responsible for budgets.
- Abuse of power: the TI report found that there was sexual abuse in schools from teachers. The TI report also found that many schools were plagued by teacher absenteeism and alcoholism.

Without this basic education, the report found it was nearly impossible to go on to high school or college. African children are missing this link that allows them to have a chance in trade or to go beyond their villages.

== Involvement of non-governmental organizations ==
A report by USAID and the Bureau for Africa, Office of Sustainable Development, found that non-governmental organizations (NGOs) are increasingly participating in the delivery of education services and education policy decisions and are included by donors and government officials in many parts of the education system. Of course, this varies from country to country and region to region.

NGOs working in education in Africa often encounter tension and competition. Schools, parents, and, most often, government officials may feel threatened by third-party involvement and feel that they are "crashing the party." The report asserts that for NGOs to be effective, they must understand that they do not have the same perspective as government officials regarding who is in control. They will compromise their objectives if they do not recognize the government of the country they are working in.

The report goes into more detail about NGO relations with governments in education. The relationship is viewed from completely separate points. African governments see NGOs and their work as "an affair of government" or, in other words, working as a part of and collaborating with the country's government. NGOs, on the other hand, view themselves as very separate entities in African education. They see themselves fulfilling moral responsibility. They believe they are identifying needs or areas of development in situations under which the government has ultimately been unaccountable and separately mobilizing resources toward those needs or development areas. Government and NGOs may hold contrasting beliefs about each other's abilities. Governments often think NGOs are unqualified to make important policy decisions and that they could undermine their legitimacy if seen as superior. In some cases, NGOs have found the government incompetent themselves, if not their fault, as the fault of a lack of resources. In the best cases, NGOs and government officials find each other's mutual strengths in education policy and find ways to practically collaborate and reach both of their objectives.

To be effective in education in Africa, NGOs must effect policy and create policy changes that support their projects. NGOs have also found that they must create and foster relationships with many different stakeholders, the most important of which are usually donors and government officials. The biggest challenge for NGOs has been linking these networks together. NGO interventions to change policy have revealed that NGO programs have failed to create a successful way to change the policy process while making sure that the public understands and is a part of education policy.

== Adult education ==
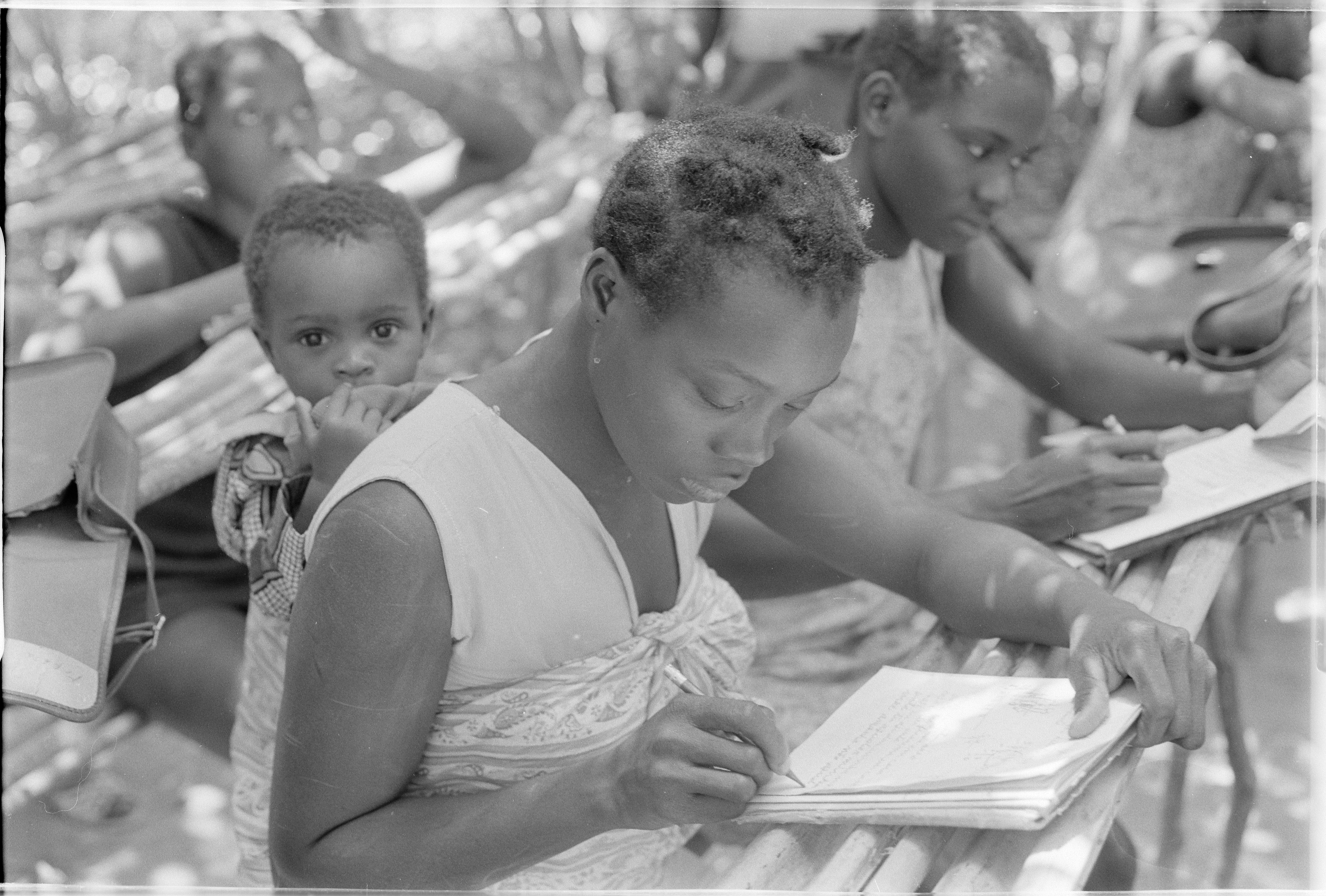
Open air school for adults, Guinea-Bissau, 1974

Adult education in Africa, having experienced a comeback following the independence and increasing prosperity of many African nations, poses specific requirements on policymakers and planners to consider indigenous cultural traits and characteristics. With a moderate backlash against Western ideals and educational traditions, many universities and other institutions of higher education take it upon themselves to develop a new approach to higher education and adult education.

Most contemporary analysts regard illiteracy as a development issue because of the link between poverty and illiteracy. Funding is inadequate and inconsistent and is needed for priority areas such as educator training, monitoring, and evaluation. There is a clear need for investment in capacity development, having a full, sufficiently paid, and well-qualified professional staff, and increasing the demands for adult education professionals. The majority of adult educators are untrained, especially in basic literacy. Governments often employ school teachers and others in adult education posts rather than experienced adult educators. Many of the difficulties experienced could be solved by an allocation of resources to meet the needs (adequate funds, more staff, appropriate staff training, and suitable material). Underfunding is a huge threat to the sustainability of these programs and, in some cases, to their continued existence. The best-reported data on funding is about adult literacy and non-formal education programs. Funding for continuing education, either academic or vocational, is provided and reported on, but little data is given on its financing. Funding may come from public or private sector sources. International and foreign aid is also likely to be important. The costs of adult education seem to be kept artificially low by using state facilities and by the extremely low salaries paid to many adult education specialists.

Public universities have not successfully attracted older students to mainstream degree programs. In South Africa, the post-Apartheid ideal of opening access to public higher education for growing numbers of non-traditional students is not yet a reality. However, certain countries have reported some success rates in adult education programs. Between 1990 and 2007, Uganda enrolled over 2 million participants in the functional adult literacy program. The Family Basic Education program was active in 18 schools by 2005, reaching over 3,300 children and 1,400 parents. This is a successful family literacy mediation whose impact has been evaluated at the household, school, and community levels.

Unfortunately, the national reports typically do not provide sufficient information on the content of the adult education programs that are run in their countries. In the majority of cases, the name of the program is given in as much detail as possible. Curriculum content does not seem to be a major issue.

=== Cultural considerations ===
In addition to strong traditional beliefs, years of slavery through colonization have led to a sense of unity and common struggle in African communities. Therefore, lesson plans in these areas should reflect this cultural sensibility; collaboration and cooperation are key to successful programs. Teaching techniques that utilize these ideas may include story-telling, experiential simulation, and the practice of indigenous traditions with slight modifications. Every program and lesson must be tailored to the particular community because they almost always learn, live, and achieve as a group.

Informal education plays a decisive role in Indigenous learning in African communities. This poses a significant challenge to Western-style program planners, who emphasize formal learning within a designated time frame and setting. These requirements must often be abandoned to achieve success in communities without a strong affinity for time and formal education. Programs must be planned to become ingrained into participants' daily lives, reflect their values, and add positive functionality. Successful programs often involve more long-term learning arrangements consisting of regular visits and the free, unforced exchange of information.

=== Philosophies ===
African philosophy of adult education recognizes Western ideas such as liberalism, progressivism, humanism, and behaviorism while complementing them with native African perspectives.

- Ethnophilosophy is the idea that the main purpose of adult education is to enable social harmony at all levels of society, from immediate family to community and country. It is important to ensure the retention of knowledge passed down from generation to generation concerning values, cultural understanding, and beliefs. This philosophy promotes active learning – learning by doing, and following and practicing the work of the elders. Particular lessons may be taught through role-play, practical demonstrations, exhibitions, discussions, or competitions.
- The nationalist-ideological philosophy separates itself from ethnic philosophy in that it is less concerned with learning methods and more with its use. As a philosophy born of the revolutionary movements of the 1950s, it is unsurprising that its main focus is to be able to apply knowledge to active participation in politics and civil society. Although it is important in this philosophy to retain the communal nature of traditional African society, functionalism for social understanding and change is important in its implementation.
- Professional philosophy represents the strongest bridge between Western and traditional African educational systems. It promotes a hybrid approach to adult programs, allowing for a wide range of learning techniques, even purely cognitive lectures, so long as community values are accounted for within the lesson.
- Finally, philosophic sagacity suggests that the only true African philosophies are those that have developed with no contact with the West whatsoever. Rather than a specific approach, this idea notes the huge range of educational techniques that a wide variety of people may use throughout the continent. It essentially states that no one correct method exists and that the participants should always set the subject and activities.

== Women's education ==
In 2000, 93.4 million women in sub-Saharan Africa were illiterate. Many reasons exist for why formal education for women and girls is unavailable, including cultural reasons. For example, some believe that a woman's education will get in the way of her duties as a wife and a mother. In some places in Africa where women marry at age 12 or 13, education hinders a young woman's social development.

A positive correlation exists between the enrollment of girls in primary school and the gross national product and the increase in life expectancy. However, women's education in Africa has sometimes been dotted with instances of sexual violence. Sexual violence against girls and female students affects many African education systems. In sub-Saharan Africa, sexual violence is one of the most common and least-known forms of corruption.

UNESCO supports adult education, especially women's education in Africa. Some schools in Africa, like Loveth International Schools, primarily help girls lacking support to attend school to attend their boarding schools. Malawi is also improving the education of girls who have lost their parents to HIV.

=== Disparity in education ===
While most of the Millennium Development Goals faced a deadline of 2015, the gender parity target was set to be achieved ten years earlier — an acknowledgment that equal access to education is the foundation for all other development goals. Gender disparity is defined as inequalities of some quantity attributed to gender. In countries where resources and school facilities are lacking and total enrollments are low, families must often choose between sending a girl or a boy to school. Of an estimated 101 million children not in school, more than half are girls. However, this statistic is increased when examining secondary school education. In high-income countries, 95% as many girls as boys attend primary and secondary schools. However, in sub-Saharan Africa, the figure is just 60%.

The foremost factor limiting female education is poverty. Poverty plays a key role when facing direct costs such as tuition fees, the cost of textbooks, uniforms, transportation, and other expenses. Wherever, especially in families with many children, these costs exceed the income of the family, girls are the first to be denied schooling. This gender bias decision in sending females to school is also based on gender roles dictated by culture. Girls must usually complete household chores or care for their younger siblings when they come home. This limits their time to study; in many cases, they may even have to miss school to complete their duties. Boys, however, may be given more time to study if their parents believe that education will allow them to earn more. Expectations, attitudes, and biases in communities and families, economic costs, social traditions, and religious and cultural beliefs limit girls' educational opportunities.

Additionally, in most African societies, women are seen as the collectors, managers, and guardians of water, especially within the domestic sphere, which includes household chores, cooking, washing, and child-rearing. Because of these traditional gender labor roles, women are forced to spend around 60% of each day collecting water, which translates to approximately 200 million collective work hours by women globally per day and a decrease in the amount of time available for education, as shown by the correlation of a decrease in access to water with a decrease in combined primary, secondary, and tertiary enrollment of women.

Whatever the underlying reasons are, having large numbers of girls outside the formal schooling system brings developmental challenges to current and future generations. According to UNESCO, the rates of female children out of primary school are higher than that of male children in all the African countries where data is available. Until equal numbers of girls and boys are in school, it will be impossible to build the knowledge necessary to eradicate poverty and hunger, combat disease, and ensure environmental sustainability.

=== Significance of a gender-equitable education system ===
In Africa and the Arab world, promoting gender equality and empowering women is perhaps the most important of the eight Millennium Development Goals. The target of achieving this goal is to eliminate gender disparity in primary and secondary enrollment, preferably by 2005 and at all levels by 2015. Women deserve the instrumental effects of gender equality in education and the intrinsic dimension of female education, which in essence derives from the role of education in enhancing a woman's set of capabilities. Thus, in theory, there is a direct effect from female education to income (or growth). Education, especially for girls, has social and economic benefits for society. Women earn only one-tenth of the world's income and own less than 1% of property, so households without a male head are at special risk of impoverishment. These women will also be less likely to immunize their children and know how to help them survive. Educated women tend to have fewer and healthier children, and these children are more likely to attend school. Higher female education makes women better-informed mothers and hence could contribute to lowering child mortality rates and malnutrition.

In Africa, limited education and employment opportunities for women reduce annual per capita growth by 0.8%. Had this growth taken place, Africa's economies would have doubled over the past 30 years. It is estimated that some low-income countries in Africa would need up to $23.8 billion annually to achieve the Millennium Development Goal focused on promoting gender equality and empowering women by 2015. This would translate from $7 to $13 per capita per year from 2006 to 2015, according to OECD-DAC.

Education is also key to an effective response to HIV/AIDS. Studies show that educated women are more likely to know how to prevent HIV infection, delay sexual activity, and take measures to protect themselves. New analysis by the Global Campaign for Education suggests that if all children received a complete primary education, the economic impact of HIV/AIDS could be greatly reduced, and around 700,000 cases of HIV in young adults could be prevented each year—seven million in a decade. According to the Global Campaign for Education, "research shows that a primary education is the minimum threshold needed to benefit from health information programs. Not only is a basic education essential to be able to process and evaluate information, it also gives the most marginalized groups in society—notably young women—the status and confidence needed to act on information and refuse unsafe sex."

=== Current policies of progression ===
The Convention on the Elimination of All Forms of Discrimination against Women (CEDAW), adopted in 1979 by the UN General Assembly and acceded to by 180 States, sets down rights for women, of freedom from discrimination and equality under the law. CEDAW argues that women's rights and equality are also the keys to the survival and development of children and to building healthy families, communities, and nations. Article 10 pinpoints nine changes that must be made to help African women and other women suffering from gender disparity. It first states there must be the same conditions for careers, vocational guidance, and the achievement of diplomas in educational establishments of all categories in rural and urban areas. This equality shall be ensured in pre-school, general, technical, professional, and higher technical education, as well as in all types of vocational training. Second, it requires access to the same curricula, the same examinations, teaching staff with qualifications of the same standard and school premises and equipment of the same quality. Third is eliminating any stereotyped concept of the roles of men and women at all levels and in all forms of education. This is encouraged by coeducation and other types of education that will help achieve this aim, particularly by revising textbooks and school programs and adapting teaching methods. Fourth is the same opportunity to benefit from scholarships and other study grants. Similarly, the fifth change requires the same opportunities for access to programs of continuing education, including adult and functional literacy programs, particularly those aimed at reducing, at the earliest possible time, any gap in education existing between men and women. Sixth is the reduction of female student drop-out rates and the organization of programs for girls and women who have left school prematurely. The seventh concern is the same opportunities to participate actively in sports and physical education. Lastly is access to specific educational information to help ensure the health and well-being of families, including information and advice on family planning.

Other global goals echoing these commitments include the World Education Forum's Dakar platform, which stresses the rights of girls, ethnic minorities, and children in difficult circumstances, and A World Fit for Children's emphasis on ensuring girls' equal access to and achievement in basic education of good quality. In April 2000 more than 1,100 participants from 164 countries gathered in Dakar, Senegal, for the World Education Forum. Ranging from teachers to prime ministers, academics to policymakers, non-governmental bodies to the heads of major international organizations, they adopted the Dakar Framework for Action, Education for All: Meeting Our Collective Commitments (EFA). The goal is education for all as laid out by the World Conference on Education for All and other international conferences. Between 1990 and 1998 the net enrollment of boys increased by 9% to 56%, and of girls by 7% to 48% in sub-Saharan Africa. However, these figures mask considerable regional variations. In countries of the Indian Ocean, both girls and boys attained over 70% net enrollment. The most outstanding progress in terms of percentage increase of boys' enrollment was in East Africa, where the net enrollment of boys increased by 27% (to 60%) and of girls by 18% (to 50%). For girls in Southern Africa, the comparable figures for girls were 23% (to 7%) and for boys, 16% (to 58%).

In 2017, the Forum for African Women Educationalists (FAWE) announced a call for a second round of research proposals from research institutions for its Strengthening Gender Research To Improve Girls' And Women's Education In Africa initiative. The initiative, which is supported by the Norwegian Agency for Development Cooperation (NORAD), promotes girls and women's education through the integration of gender into education policy and practice in sub-Saharan Africa. FAWE believes investing in African research is vital to producing current information for advocacy in education policy. This three-year research initiative aims to work collaboratively with established research institutions to produce pertinent and robust research, which can be used to constructively engage government, policymakers and other regional bodies on strategies to advance girls' education in Africa. Findings from the research will be used to inform FAWE's advocacy work and help redress gender inequities that hinder women's fulfillment of their right to education and meaningful participation in Africa's social and economic advancement.

== Major progress in access to education ==
A joint study by the World Bank and the French Development Agency carried out by Alain Mingat, Blandine Ledoux and Ramahatra Rakotomalala sought to anticipate the pressures that would be brought to bear on post-primary teaching:

"In the reference year (2005), our sample of 33 countries in sub-Saharan Africa had 14.9 million pupils enrolled in the first year of secondary school. If the rate of completion of the primary stage reaches 95% by 2020 with levels of transition from primary to the first year of secondary maintained at their current level in each country, the first year of secondary school would have 37.2 million pupils in 2020, or 2.5 times the current number. If all the pupils finishing primary school could continue with their education, the number of pupils in the first year of secondary school would reach 62.9 million by 2020, a multiplication by 4.2 over the period."

Behind the regional averages, there are still enormous disparities between the countries, and even between the different zones and regions within countries, which means that it is not possible to "[…] identify conditions that apply uniformly to education across the different countries of sub-Saharan Africa." While some countries have lower demographic growth, others enjoy a more satisfactory level of school enrolment. Only a few countries are falling seriously behind in education at the same time as having to address a steady growth in their school-age population: Niger, Eritrea, Burundi, Guinea-Bissau, Uganda and to a lesser extent Burkina Faso, Chad, Mali, Mozambique, Rwanda, Senegal and Malawi are particularly affected by this dual constraint. The Education for All (EFA) 2012 report highlights great disparities between the sub-Saharan African countries: the percentage of children excluded from primary school is only 7% in Gabon and 14% in Congo compared to over 55% in Burkina Faso and Niger. The gap in terms of the proportion of those excluded from the first year of middle school is even wider, with 6% in Gabon compared to 68% in Burkina Faso and 73% in Niger.

Most out-of-school populations are in countries with armed conflict or very weak governance. At the Dakar Forum, the 181 signatory countries of the Dakar Framework for Action identified armed conflict as well as internal instability within a country as "a major barrier towards attaining Education for All" – education being one of the sectors to suffer most from the effects of armed conflict and political instability. In the 2011 EFA Global Monitoring Report, UNESCO pointed out that the countries touched by conflict showed a gross rate of secondary school admissions almost 30% lower than countries of equivalent revenue that were at peace. Conflicts also affect literacy rates. The global literacy rate among adults in countries touched by conflict was 69% in 2010 compared to 85% in peaceful countries. Twenty states in sub-Saharan Africa have been touched by conflict since 1999. Those countries affected by armed conflict, such as Somalia and the Democratic Republic of the Congo, are furthest from meeting the EFA goals and contain the majority of the unschooled inhabitants of sub-Saharan Africa. In the Democratic Republic of the Congo, in North Kivu, a region particularly affected by conflicts, for example, the likelihood of young people aged between 17 and 22 having had only two years of schooling was twice the national average.

Less than half the children in sub-Saharan Africa can neither read nor write: a quarter of primary-school-age children reach the fourth year without acquiring the basics, and over a third do not reach the fourth year. According to the 2010 EFA Global Monitoring Report, "millions of children are leaving school without having acquired basic skills. In some countries in sub-Saharan Africa, young adults with five years of education had a 40% probability of being illiterate". The teacher training systems are generally not able to meet the quantitative and qualitative needs of training. In Chad, for example, only 35.5% of teachers are certified to teach.

In addition to the lack of qualified teachers, there is also the problem of extra-large classes in public schools. In Nigeria, there are schools with a teacher–to–pupil ratio of 1:25 for pre-primary classes, 1:35 for primary, and 1:40 for secondary schools. This makes it difficult for personalized instruction. There is also a lack of culturally relevant teaching-learning aids for teachers and students.

School-based meal programs are sometimes used to ease access to education, especially in poor communities. Altogether, at least 60.1 million children in Africa benefit from school meal programs, reaching about 21% of school-age children on the continent. School feeding coverage is greatest in southern Africa and least in central Africa. From 2017 to 2020, these school meal programs expanded in a majority of African countries.

== Educational technology ==
Educational technology in sub-Saharan Africa refers to the promotion, development, and use of information and communication technologies (ICT), m-learning, media, and other technological tools to improve aspects of education in sub-Saharan Africa. Since the 1960s, various information and communication technologies have aroused strong interest in sub-Saharan Africa to increase access to education and enhance its quality and fairness.

The development of individual computer technology has proved a major turning point in the implementation of projects dependent on technology use and calls for the acquisition of computer skills first by teachers and then by pupils. Between 1990 and 2000, multiple actions were taken to turn technologies into a lever for improving education in sub-Saharan Africa. Many initiatives focused on equipping schools with computer hardware. Several NGOs contributed, on varying scales, to bringing computer hardware into Africa, such as groups like Computer Aid International, Digital Links, School Net Africa and World Computer Exchange. Sometimes, with backing from cooperation agencies or development agencies like USAID, the African Bank, or the French Ministry of Foreign Affairs, these individual initiatives grew without adequate coordination. States found it difficult to define their national strategies about ICT in education.

The American One Laptop per Child (OLPC) project, launched in several African countries in 2005, aimed to equip schools with laptop computers at a low cost. While the average price of an inexpensive personal computer was between US$200 and US$500, OLPC offered its ultraportable XO-1 computer at US$100. The program marked an important step in potential access to ICT. OLPC became an institutional system: the program was "bought" by governments, which then took responsibility for distribution to the schools. The underlying logic of the initiative was centralization, thus enabling the large-scale distribution of the equipment. Almost 2 million teachers and pupils are now involved in the program worldwide, and more than 2.4 million computers have been delivered. Following on from OLPC, the Intel group launched Classmate PC, a similar program also intended for pupils in developing countries. Though it has a smaller presence in sub-Saharan Africa than the OLPC project, Classmate PC has enabled laptop computers to be delivered to primary schools in the Seychelles and Kenya, particularly in rural areas. Also, in Kenya, the CFSK (Computers for School in Kenya) project was started in 2002 to distribute computers to almost 9,000 schools.

The cross-fertilization of teaching models and tools has broadened the potential of ICT within the educational framework. Certain technologies, perceived as outdated compared to more innovative technology, remain very much embedded in local practice. Today, they are undergoing a partial revival, thanks to the combination of different media that can be used in any project. Despite its limited uses in teaching, radio is a medium that still has considerable reach in terms of its audience. It is cheaper than a computer and has a cost-benefit ratio that makes it attractive to many project planners. Launched in 2008, the BBC Janala program, offering English courses in a combination of different media, including lessons of a few minutes via mobile phone, received more than 85,000 calls per day in the weeks following the launch of the service. In 15 months, over 10 million calls (paid but at a reduced price compared to normal communication) were made by over 3 million users. Television, a feature of many households, is witnessing a revival in its educational uses by being combined with other media. As part of the Bridge-IT program in Tanzania, short educational videos, also available on mobile phones, are broadcast on classroom televisions so that all the pupils can participate collectively. The e-Schools Network in South Africa has also, since March 2013, been developing an educational project, the object of which is to utilize unused television frequencies. As of 2015, ten schools participated in the project.

Another digital tool with multiple uses, the interactive whiteboard (IWB), is also being used in some schools in sub-Saharan Africa. At the end of the 2000s, the Education for All Network (REPTA), in partnership with the Worldwide Fund for Digital Solidarity (FSN) and, in France, the Interministerial Delegation for Digital Education in Africa (DIENA) made interactive whiteboards available to schools in Burkina Faso, Niger, Benin, Senegal and Mali, along with open content. Using the IWB has positively affected motivation for pupils and teachers alike. However, their impact in terms of learning has been muted. This system marginalizes the direct participation of the pupils in favor of multi-media demonstrations initiated by the teacher.

The main initiatives based on using ICT and the Internet in education originally focused on distance learning at the university level. Thus, the African Virtual University (AVU), set up by the World Bank in 1997, was originally conceived as an alternative to traditional teaching. When it became an intergovernmental agency in 2003, it trained 40,000 people, mostly on short programs. It shifted its focus to teacher training and integrating technology into higher education. The AVU has ten e-learning centers. The Agence Universitaire de la Francophonie (AUF) has also, since 1999, set up around forty French-speaking digital campuses, more than half of them in Africa. In these infrastructures, dedicated to technology and set up within the universities, the AUF offers access to over 80 first and master's degrees entirely through distance learning, about 30 of which are awarded by African institutions and created with its support. More recently, the massive open online course (MOOC) phenomenon has developed, first in the United States and then in Europe.

== Challenges ==
Around half of all primary and lower secondary children and youth who are out of school around the world are in Africa and progress in reducing out-of-school numbers has slowed down since 2015. Across sub-Saharan Africa, a very large portion of teenagers are missing out on schooling. Data from the UN shows that nearly 6 in 10 young people between 15 and 17 are not enrolled in education. This situation is motivating activists on the continent to push for improvements.

In many regions, children are often seen working on farms or playing outside instead of in classrooms. This is partly due to a lack of proper school infrastructure. Some countries struggle to provide necessities like toilets, desks, and chairs. One Nigerian primary school student interviewed by Deutsche Welle described his school as being far away and lacking essential resources, despite his teachers' dedication.

Some challenges in African education include:

Access

One of the most pressing issues is access to education, particularly in rural and remote areas. One in five primary school-age children in sub-Saharan Africa are out of school; their number is nearly as high as it was in 1990. Limited infrastructure, as highlighted in a Japan International Cooperation Agency (JICA) report, means schools are often far away, and children, especially girls facing safety concerns, may struggle to attend. A lack of investment in school infrastructure also means that classrooms are overcrowded. Only 5 of 23 countries with available data have met the target ratio of 40:1. Poverty further restricts access. Families may choose child labor over education to meet basic needs. Conflict and instability only exacerbate the problem, with schools closing due to violence and displacement.

Quality

Even if children can attend school, the quality of education can be subpar. Overcrowded classrooms with limited resources hinder effective teaching. New school building construction stagnated or declined in much of sub-Saharan Africa from 2010 to 2020. Inadequate funding translates to a lack of textbooks, qualified teachers, and proper learning materials. Today, only one in three primary school students in Africa receives a school meal. Just one in five is taught in their home language. Each textbook is shared by three students, on average, yet having one’s own textbook can increase children’s literacy scores by up to 20%. Traditional curricula may not be relevant to the job market or equip students with the critical thinking skills needed in the 21st century. This leads to significant learning challenges. Today, in sub-Saharan Africa, only two out of every ten children reach the end of primary school able to read and understand what they read.

Gender gap

There has been significant progress in improving gender disparity. Africa reached gender parity in primary school enrolment in 2021 and is close to achieving it in lower secondary school enrolment. However, in 2024, there were still only 93 girls for every 100 boys in upper secondary education, and 94 women for every 100 men in tertiary education. Between 2000 and 2024, the out-of-school rate for girls also fell from 47% to 28%, compared with a fall from 39% to 27% for boys. This reduced the gender gap from 8 percentage points to just 1 point.

Cultural norms prioritizing boys' education lead to higher dropout rates for girls, particularly after primary school. Early marriage and societal expectations often limit girls' academic pursuits. This reduces their opportunities and hinders overall development, as educated women play a vital role in a nation's progress.

Language barriers

Many African countries have many languages. Instruction may not be delivered in a student's native tongue, hindering comprehension. This can be particularly difficult for students from remote areas with distinct dialects.

Digital divide

Limited access to technology creates an uneven playing field, known as the digital divide. Students in urban areas with computers and the internet may have a significant advantage over those in rural areas without. This can widen the gap between the haves and have-nots and limit access to information and innovative learning methods.

Special needs

African education systems often lack the resources and support structures to cater to students with disabilities. This can lead to marginalization and exclusion for these students, hindering their potential.

Relevance to the workplace

The skills learned in school may not always translate to job opportunities. A disconnect between education and the labor market can lead to graduate unemployment and underemployment. Curricula that equip students with practical skills and knowledge relevant to the evolving job market are necessary.

Climate change

Climate change poses a significant threat to education systems. Extreme weather events can damage schools and disrupt learning. Droughts and floods can also displace communities and force children out of school to help families cope with changing environments. There is a growing need for climate-resilient education infrastructure and curriculum adaptations to address these challenges.

Rapid urbanization

Rapid urbanization across Africa strains education systems in cities. Large influxes of people can lead to overcrowded classrooms and a shortage of qualified teachers. Innovative solutions are needed to accommodate growing urban populations and ensure inclusive access to quality education.

Mental health

Mental health issues among students are a growing concern, particularly in conflict-affected regions. Education systems often lack resources and training to effectively address these needs. Integrating mental health support into schools and promoting emotional well-being is crucial for student success.

Disinformation

The spread of misinformation, disinformation, and fake news through social media and online platforms presents a new challenge for African education systems. Equipping students with critical thinking skills and media literacy is essential to enable them to discern fact from fiction.

Political insecurity and instability

Violence and unrest can force schools to close, interrupting students' education and hindering their progress.

Cultural Tension

An on going challenge in African education is balancing colonial legacy with indigenous practices. While Western models dominate, there are emerging efforts to incorporate local knowledge and traditions such as oral storytelling, proverbs, and community based learning into curricula to foster cultural identity and relevance.

== Effectiveness of aid for education ==
Aid for education is all the financial and technical assistances provided by international donors to support education systems in developing countries. Such aid has played a major role in international development initiatives in Sub-Saharan Africa that aim to raise educational standards, expand access to education, and improve educational outcomes.

=== Context ===
The origins of foreign aid for education today can be found in the years following World War II, when major shifts in aid systems and policies took place across many years. Prioritising a "productivity approach," educational aid from the 1960s to the 1980s concentrated on post-primary education, equipment, infrastructure, and technical assistance with a focus on supply-side reforms. During the 1990s and 2000s, by prioritising underprivileged groups and emphasising a "poorest first" approach, the strategy has changed to a more multidimensional perspective. From 2010 onward, aid has increasingly focused on universal access to primary education with emphasis on free access.

The adoption of the Millennium Development Goals (MDGs) in 2000, particularly Goal 2 which aimed to achieve Universal Primary Education by 2015, significantly influenced the trajectory of education aid. The Sustainable Development Goals (SDGs) were used to support this, particularly Goal 4, which aims to "ensure inclusive and equitable quality education and promote lifelong learning opportunities for all."

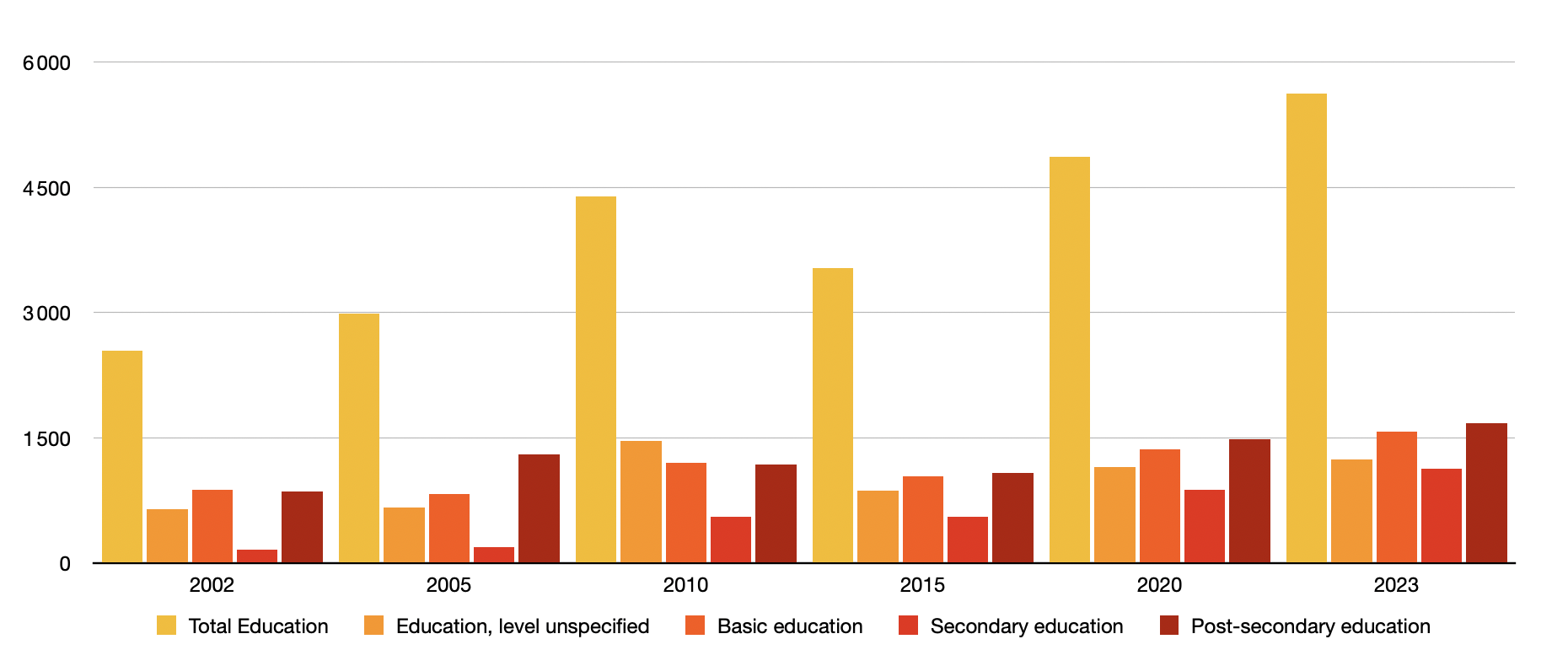
Disbursements of Official Development Assistance (ODA) from Official Donors to Africa (in millions of constant 2022 USD), based on data from the OECD Creditor Reporting System (CRS).

=== Trend ===
Despite increased aid and attention to education in Sub-Saharan Africa, significant challenges remain:

- In 2020, the primary completion rate in Sub-Saharan Africa stood at only 71%.
- Secondary net enrolment rates for Sub-Saharan Africa were just 36% in 2020.
- The tertiary gross enrolment rate for Sub-Saharan Africa was only 10% in 2020.
- Globally, 129 million girls remain out of school, including 32 million in primary school, 30 million in secondary education, and 67 million in upper-secondary education.

Within Sub-Saharan Africa, there are also significant regional disparities. For example, in Nigeria, there are sharp spatial inequalities in education, with the Northern region having lower enrollment rates compared to other areas.

=== Mechanisms through which aid affects education ===
Supply-side interventions

The majority of educational aid has traditionally focused on supply-side interventions or "first-order" educational requirements. These include: physical infrastructure development (building schools and classrooms), provision of teaching materials, teacher training and recruitment, and curriculum development.

These supply-side investments can positively affect educational enrollment by reducing travel distance to schools, improving school quality, and providing better teaching resources.

Demand-side effects

Beyond direct investments in education systems, aid can also influence educational outcomes through demand-side mechanisms:

- Income effect: Aid projects can positively impact household income, enabling greater investment in children's education.
- Conditional cash transfers and scholarships have shown positive effects on attendance and enrollment, though the impact on learning outcomes is more mixed.

Impact on educational outcomes

Research on the effectiveness of aid to education has shown mixed results, though a tentative consensus about its positive effect is emerging. Studies have found that:

- Aid has contributed to expanding school enrollments, especially in basic education, which is the most tangible outcome of education aid.
- A 1% increase in aid to education can lead to an increase in the primary completion rate of more than two percentage points.
- Higher per capita aid for education has been shown to increase country-level primary school enrollment rates to some extent.
- Aid to primary education is positively related to school enrollment rates, gender parity, and reduces the likelihood of children repeating school years.
- Education aid can substantially improve enrollment, with the most robust effect obtained through aid for education facilities and training.

Despite these positive findings, studies have also highlighted limitations:

- While aid might have increased school enrollment in Africa, it has not sufficiently translated into higher completion rates.
- Aid has made less substantial contributions to improvements in educational quality compared to its impact on enrollment.
- There are often relatively small learning gains, even in projects recording positive impact on enrollment.

=== Policy implications ===
Several important policy approaches for enhancing outcomes are suggested by research on the effectiveness of education aid in Sub-Saharan Africa:

==== Systemic approaches ====
Instead than concentrating on isolated projects, sustainable education outcomes necessitate comprehensive and systemic approaches. Evidence reveals that effective educational interventions tackle the complex structure of educational systems instead than concentrating on their individual components. Reforms in education must be planned within long-term frameworks that take institutional structure and incentives into account. Because education systems are interconnected, improvements in one area (e.g. school construction) would not result in higher learning results unless they are accompanied by investments in management systems, materials, and high-quality teachers.

==== Local ownership and contextualization ====
At all levels of the recipient country, genuine ownership and leadership are essential to the long-term viability of aid-supported educational projects. Research has shown that community demand, stakeholder ownership, and local leadership are essential factors for successful educational reforms. Even well-designed interventions may fall short of bringing lasting improvements if national education ministries, as well as local school administrators, teachers, and parents, do not support them sufficiently. Programs must be contextualized within the political economy of the countries that receive them since, without significant modification, reforms that are effective in one context might not be applicable to another.

==== Focus on quality improvement ====
Even though aid has made an important contribution to improving educational access, its impact on educational quality is still quite low. The importance of high-quality education has occasionally been eclipsed by the focus on statistics like enrollment rate. Standard educational inputs, including the building of schools or the providing of textbooks, have been demonstrated to have minimal correlations with actual learning outcomes. Future aid initiatives should give the greatest attention to funding initiatives that enhance educational quality in addition to access, such as developing curriculum, training for teachers, assessment programs, and pedagogical strategies that increase learning.

==== Balance across educational levels ====
Countries with more balanced investments across different educational sub-sectors have shown faster growth and development. In many Sub-Saharan African countries, education trajectories are marked by mismatch progress, because donors have favored specific sub-sectors and despite consensus that a comprehensive strategy is necessary. Secondary education remained underfunded at 10-12% whereas the distribution of aid changed substantially between 1995 and 2010, with post-secondary education's part rising from less than 1% to 40% of overall education aid. As a result, better coordination between donors could help ensure adequate funding at all educational system levels. It has been found that achieving universal primary education in Sub-Saharan Africa would require at least doubling the current levels of aid disbursement, which would, in turn, raise primary completion rates from 65% to approximately 78%.

==== Better organisation among donors ====
Improved collaboration between donors can increase the effectiveness of education aid. A growing number of aid actors with disparate goals and strategies may lead to disorganization and a greater administrative burden on recipient nations. In order to prevent duplication and ensure adequate coverage of various educational areas, the European Commission has underlined the significance of division of labor among development agencies involved in the education sector. Although there are still issues with implementation, initiatives like Sector-Wide Approaches (SWAps) are efforts to improve donor coordination.

== See also ==
- Adult education in Africa
- History of female education in Africa
- Computers for African Schools
- Education in the Middle East and North Africa
- Multilingual education in Africa
- Promoting Equality in African Schools

== Sources ==
This article incorporates text from a free content work. Licensed under CC-BY-SA IGO 3.0 (license statement/permission). Text taken from Digital Services for Education in Africa, UNESCO, UNESCO. UNESCO.

- Aitchison, John; Alidou, Hassana (2009). The state and development of adult learning and education in Subsaharan Africa. Hamburg: UNESCO.
- Nassimbeni, Mary; May, Bev. Adult education in South African public libraries enabling conditions and inhibiting factors. Cape Town: University of Cape Town.
