= Sahelian kingdoms =

Kingdoms and empires centered in the Sahel

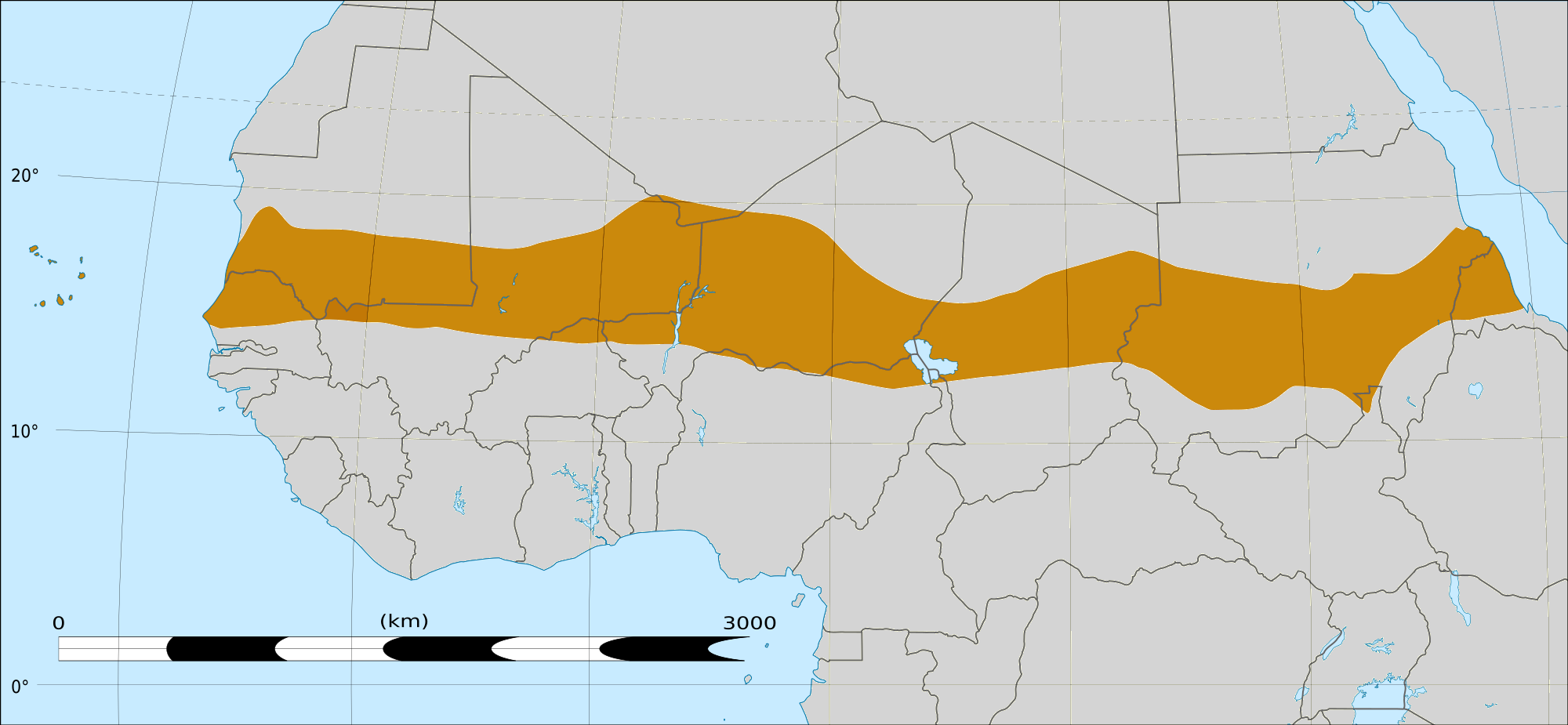
The Sahel forms a belt up to 1,000 km wide, spanning Africa from the Atlantic Ocean to the Red Sea.

The Sahelian kingdoms were a series of centralized kingdoms or empires that were centered on the Sahel, the area of grasslands south of the Sahara, from the 8th century to the 19th. The wealth of the states came from controlling the trade routes across the desert. Their power came from having large pack animals like camels and horses that were fast enough to keep a large empire under central control and were also useful in such kind of battle. All of these empires were also quite decentralized with member cities having a great deal of autonomy.

The Sahel states were limited from expanding south into the forest zone of the Bono and Yoruba as mounted warriors were all but useless in the forests and the horses and camels could not survive the diseases of the region.

== Economy ==
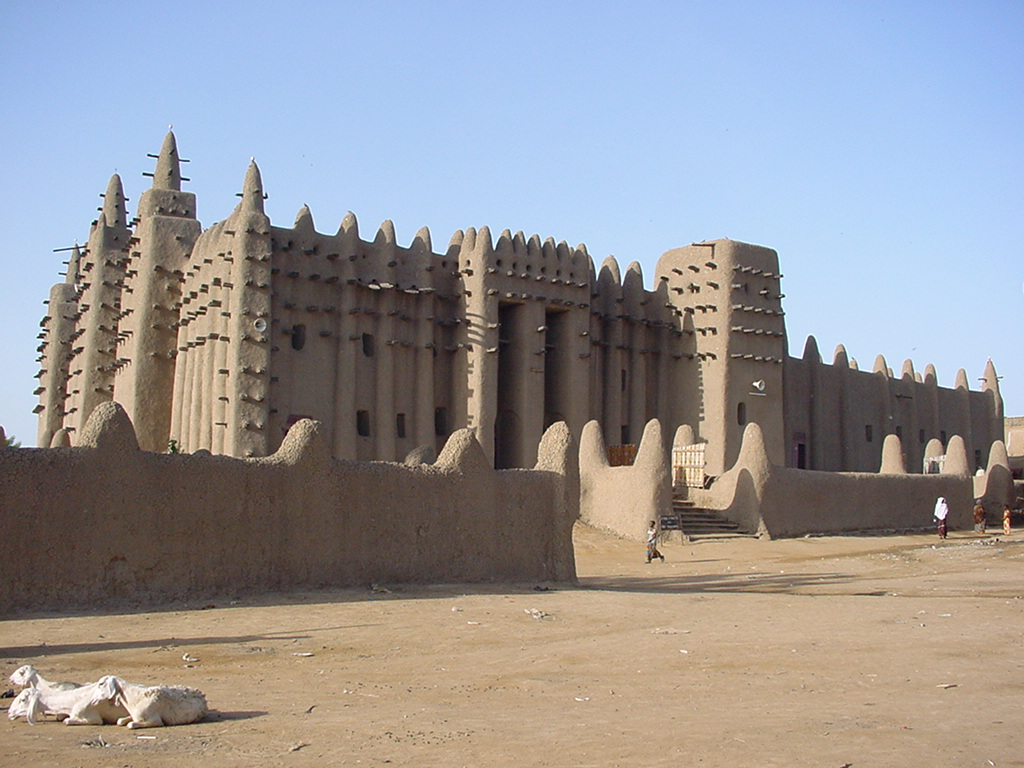
The Great Mosque of Djenne, Mali

There were integrated kingdoms and empires, with substantial cities and significant towns; and less organised territories with large scattered populations. People practised agriculture, stock-rearing, hunting, fishing, and crafts (metalworking, textiles, ceramics). They navigated along rivers and across lakes, traded over short and long distances, and used their own currencies.

== History of Sahel kingdoms ==
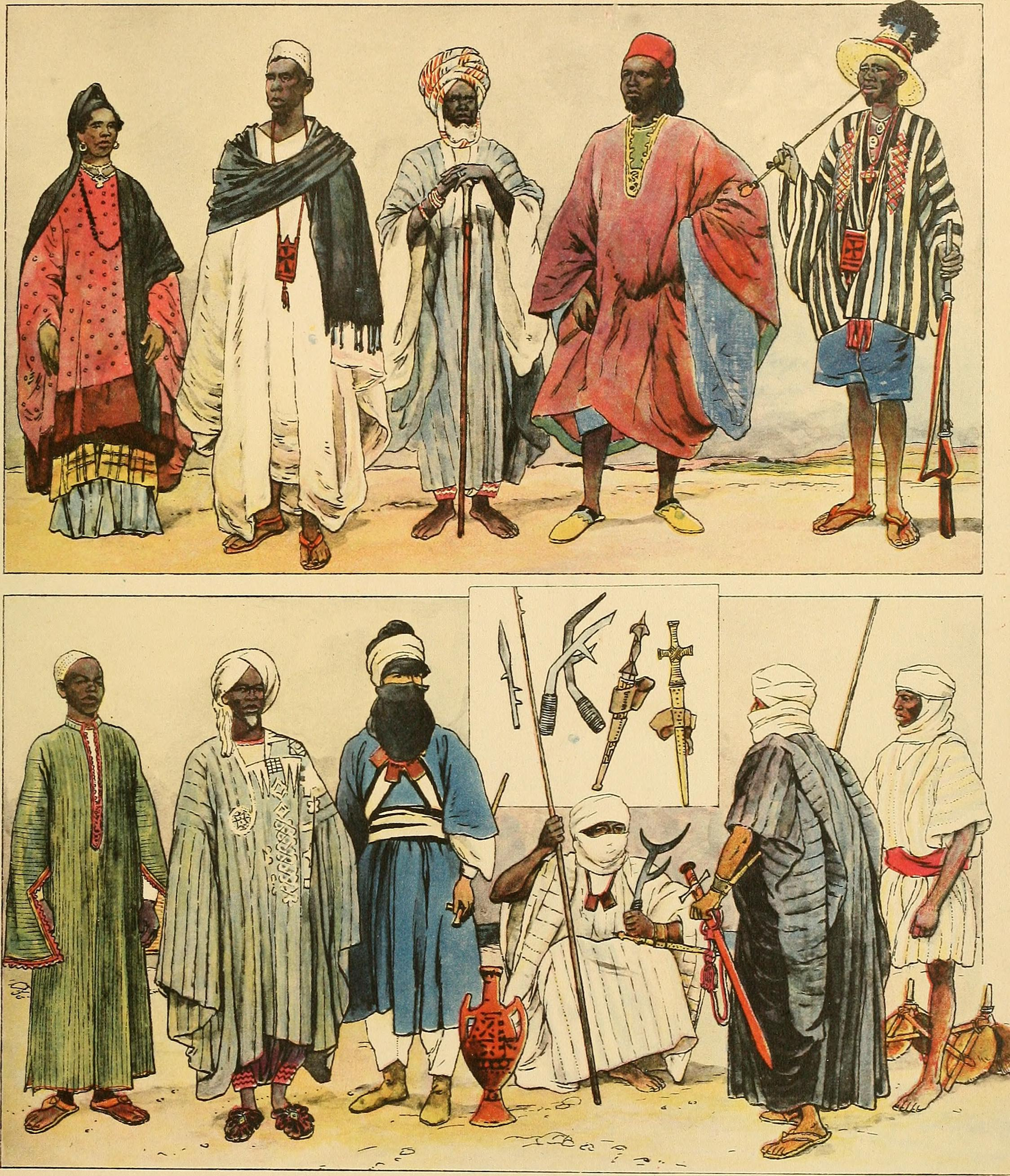
Ethnic groups in the Sahel

- The first major state to rise in this region was the Ghana Empire. Established in c. the 3rd century, it was centered in what is today Senegal and Mauritania. Ghana grew wealthy through the trans-Saharan trade routes linking Aoudaghost with Tahert and Sijilmasa in north Africa following the introduction of the camel to the western Sahel in the 3rd century AD. Ghana was the first to benefit from the introduction of pack animals by Wolof traders. Ghana dominated the region between the 3rd century and the 13th century. Smaller states in the region at this time included Takrur to the west, the Malinke kingdom of Mali to the south, and the Songhai centred on Gao to the east.
- When Ghana collapsed in the face of invasion from the Almoravids and conquest by the Sosso Empire; after 1235, the Mali Empire rose to dominate the region, which traded with Bono state at the far south. Located on the Niger River to the west of Ghana in what is today Niger and Mali, it reached its peak in the 1350s, but had lost control of a number of vassal states by 1400.
- The most powerful of these states was the Songhai Empire, which expanded rapidly beginning with king Sonni Ali in the 1460s. By 1500, it had risen to stretch from Cameroon to the Maghreb, the largest state in African history. Its territory diminished to cover only the Dendi province in 1591 as a result of the invasion by the Saadi Dynasty of Morocco. The empire collapsed in 1901 when the French deposed the last askia.
- Far to the east, on Lake Chad, the state of Kanem-Bornu, founded as Kanem in the 9th century, now rose to greater preeminence in the central Sahel region. To their west, the loosely united Hausa city-states became dominant. These two states coexisted uneasily, but were quite stable.
- In 1810, the Sokoto Caliphate rose and conquered the Hausa, creating a more centralized state. It and Kanem-Bornu would continue to exist as traditional states.

== Maps ==
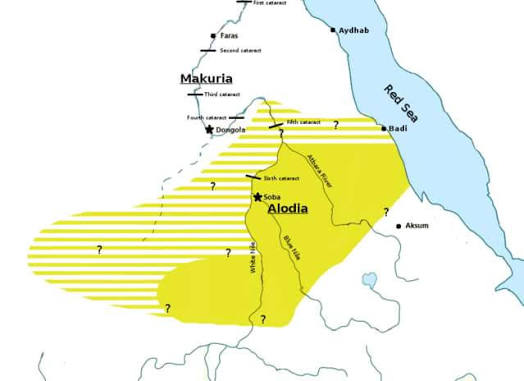
The Christian Kingdom of Alwa around 700 AD in The Eastern Sahel in modern Sudan

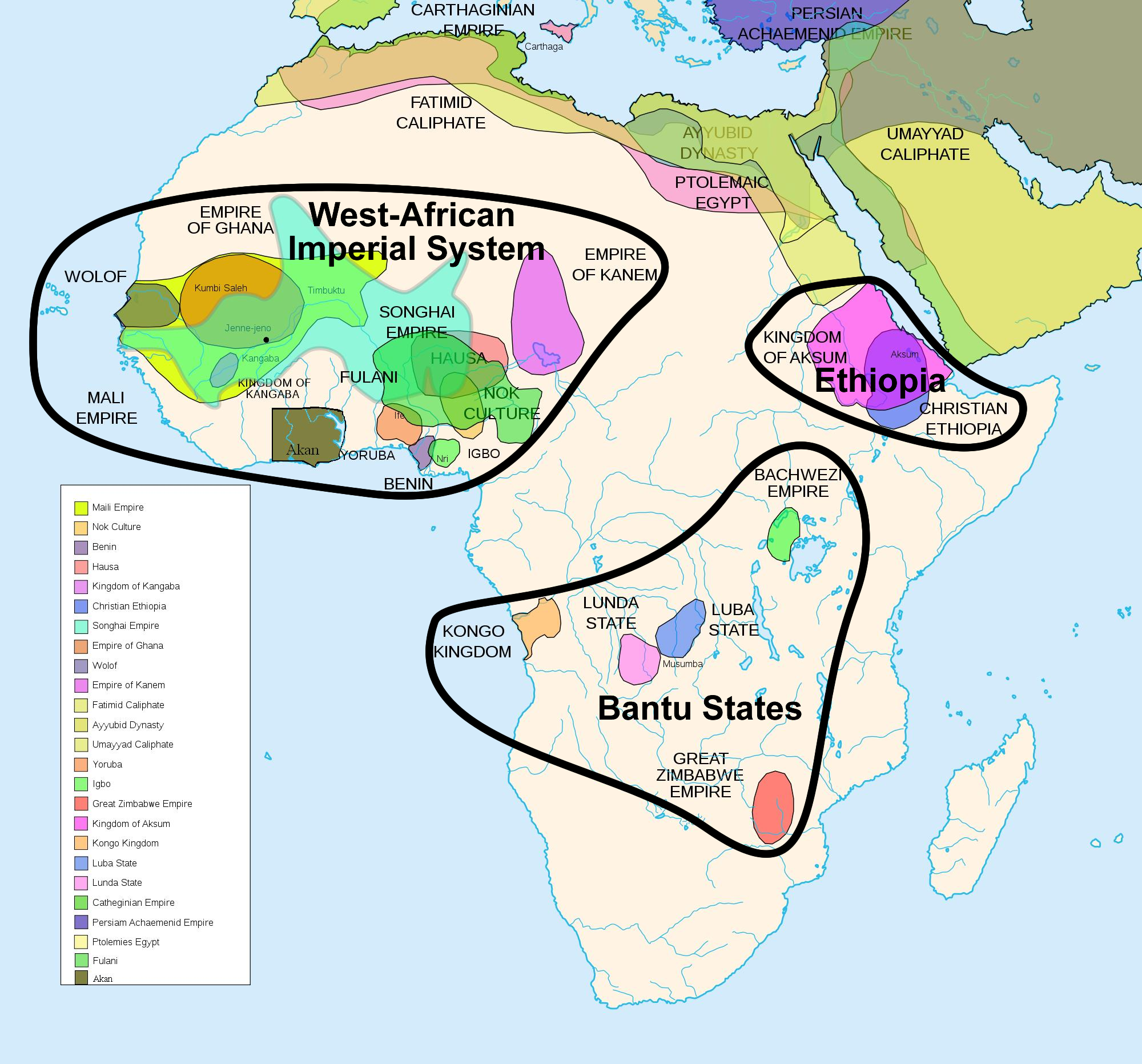
African states between 500 BCE and 1500 CE

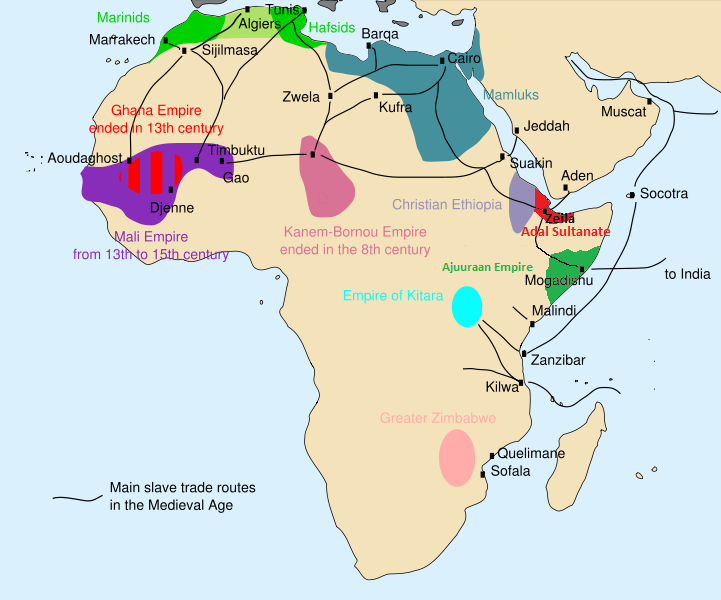
The main slave trade routes in Africa during the Middle Ages.

Trade routes of the western Saharan Desert, c. 1000–1500. Goldfields are indicated by light brown shading.

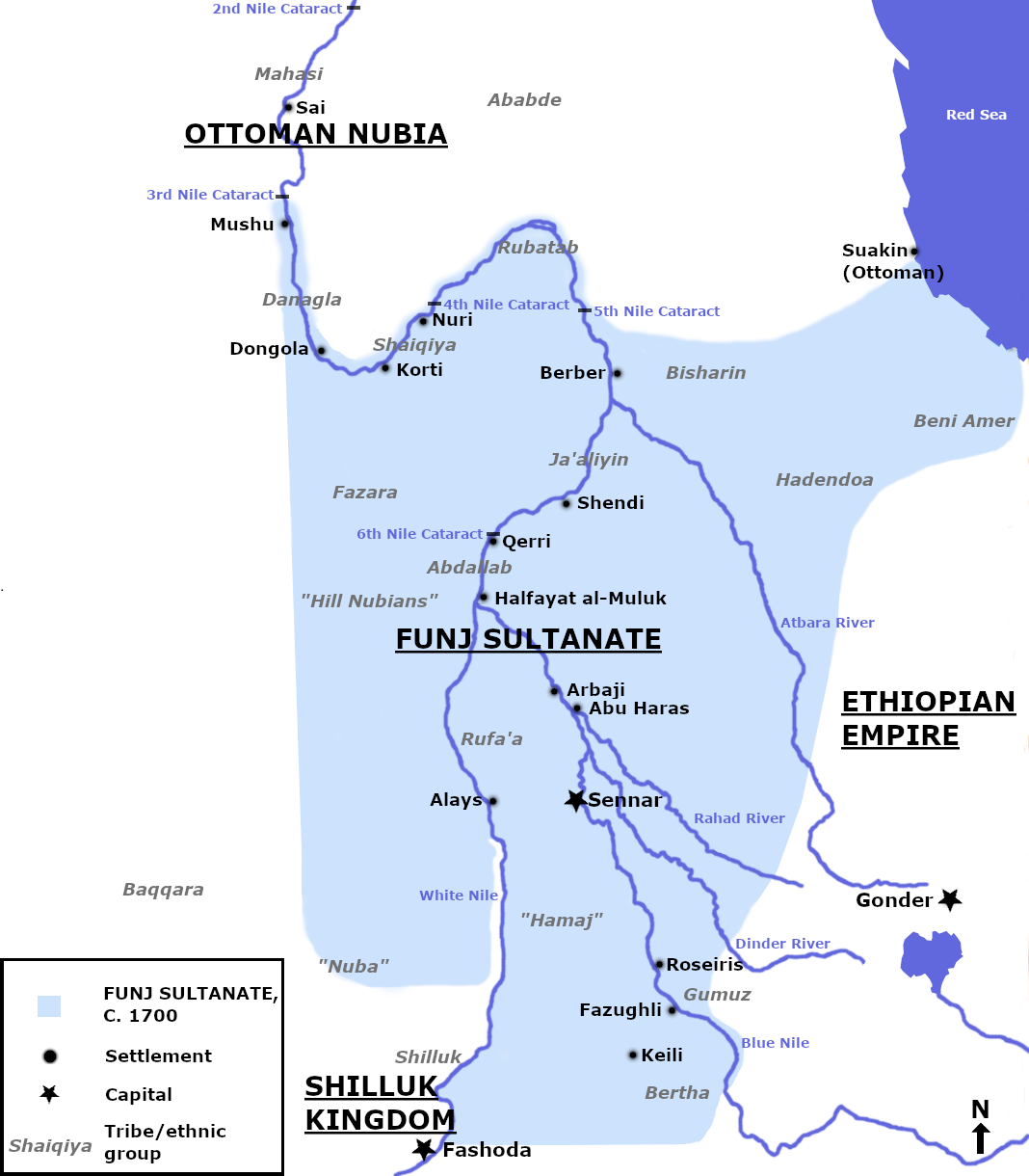
Funj Sultanate in Modern Sudan around 1700

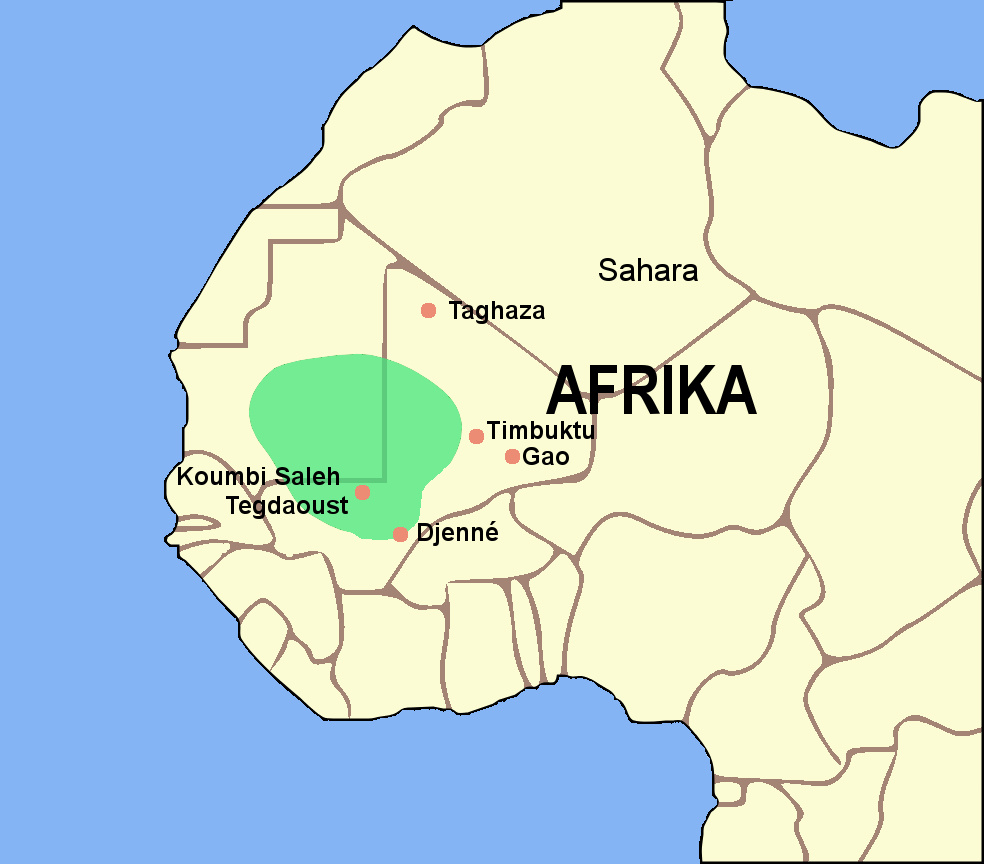
The Ghana Empire at its greatest extent, c. 1050

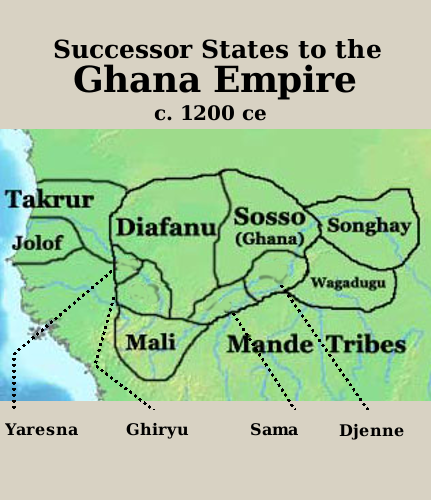
The successor states to the Ghana Empire c. 1200

Influence of the Kanem Empire c. 1200

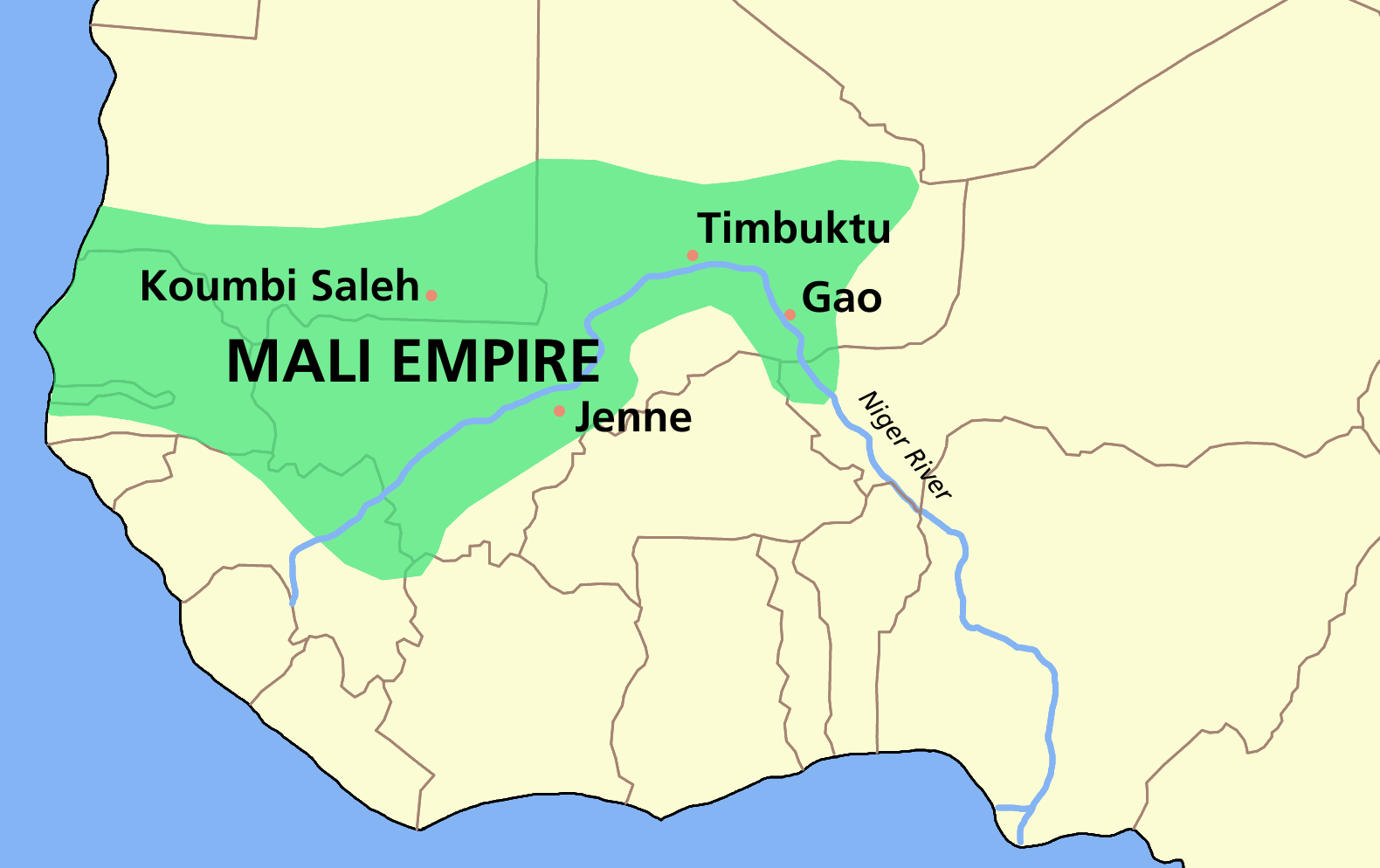
Extent of the Mali Empire, c. 1350

Approximate extent of the Mali Empire, next to the Songhai Empire, c. 1350

Constituent states of the Wolof Empire.

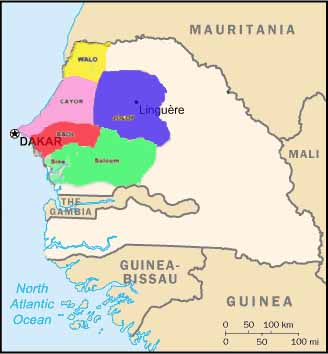
Constituent states of the Wolof Empire, c. 1400

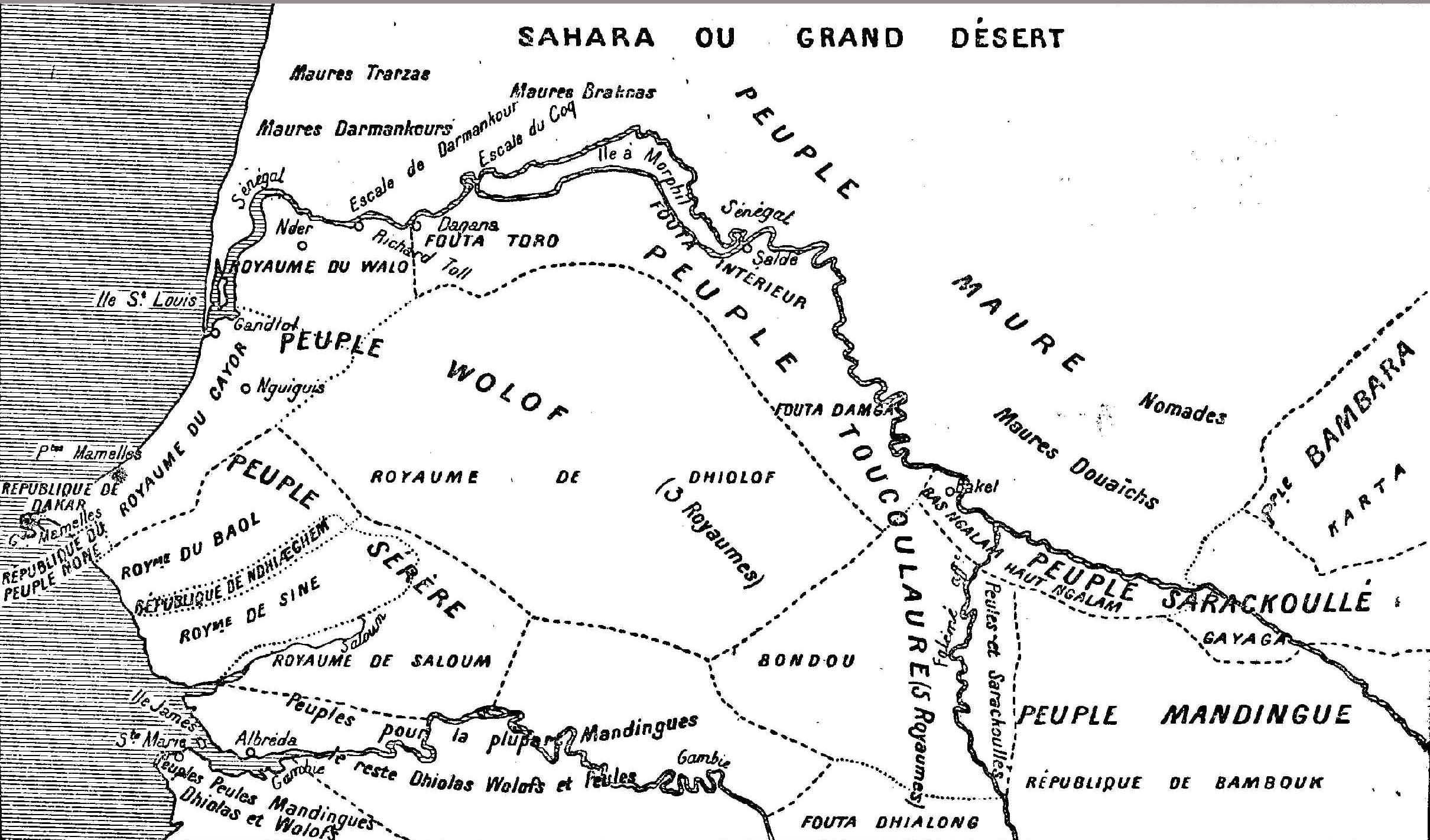
Carte des peuplades du Sénégal de l'abbé Boilat (1853): an ethnic map of Senegal at the time of French colonialism. The pre-colonial states of Baol, Sine and Saloum are arrayed along the southwest coast, with the inland areas marked "Peuple Sérère".

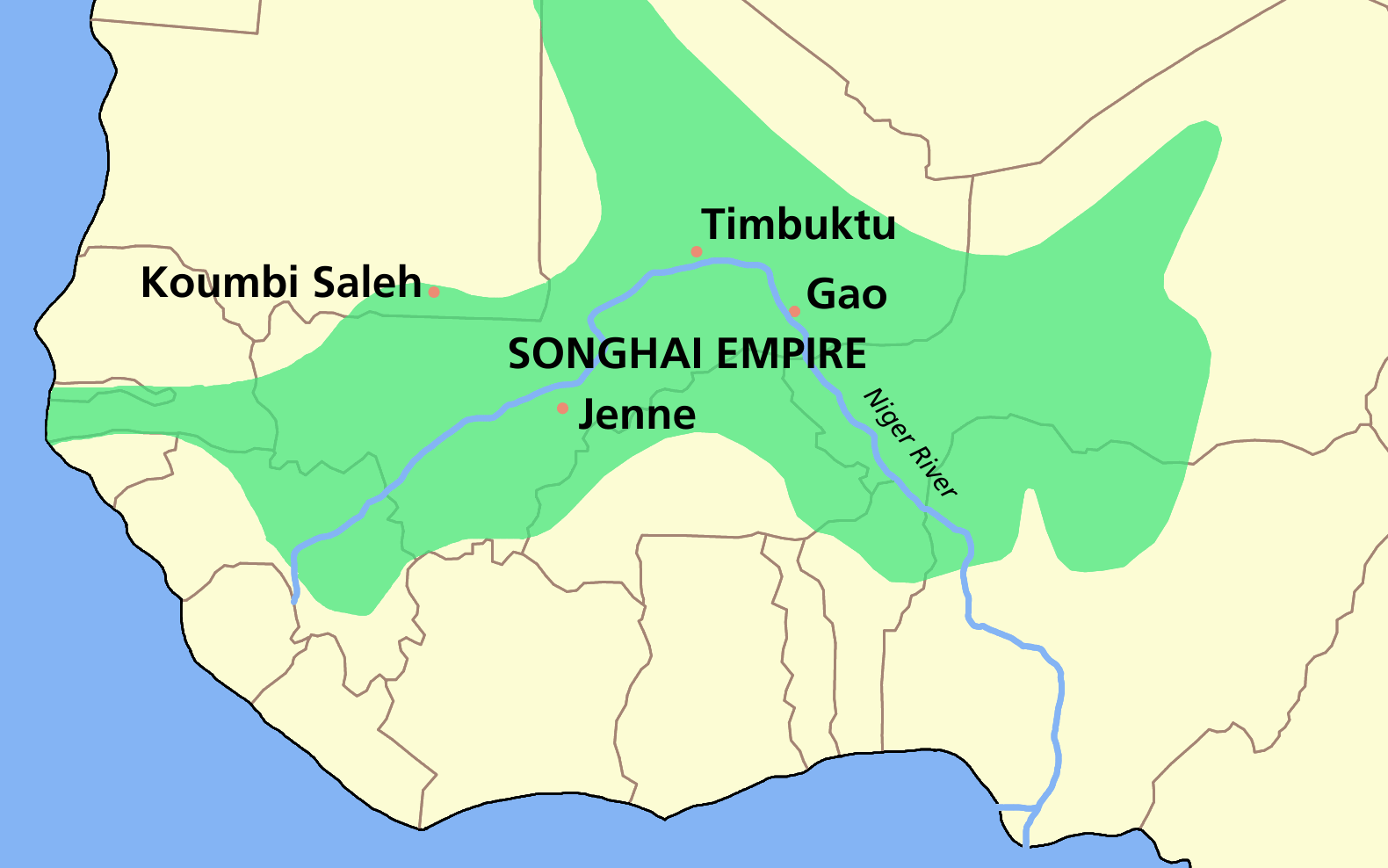
The Songhai Empire, c. 1500

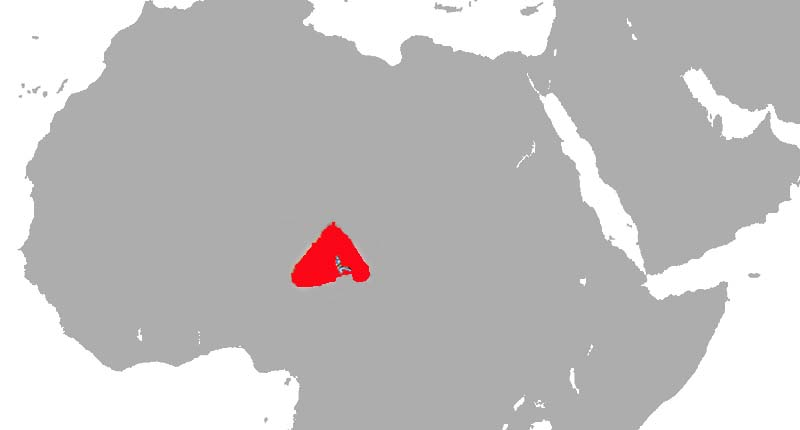
Bornu Empire territory by 1500

The Mali Empire, the Songhai Empire and Mossi kingdoms, 1530] Eastern Sahel

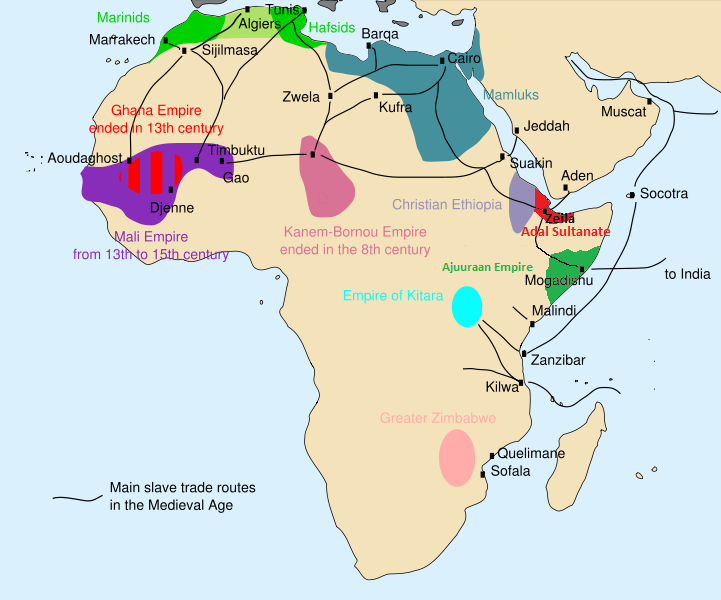
The main slave trade routes in Africa during the Middle Ages.

Trade routes of the western Saharan Desert, c. 1000–1500. Goldfields are indicated by light brown shading.

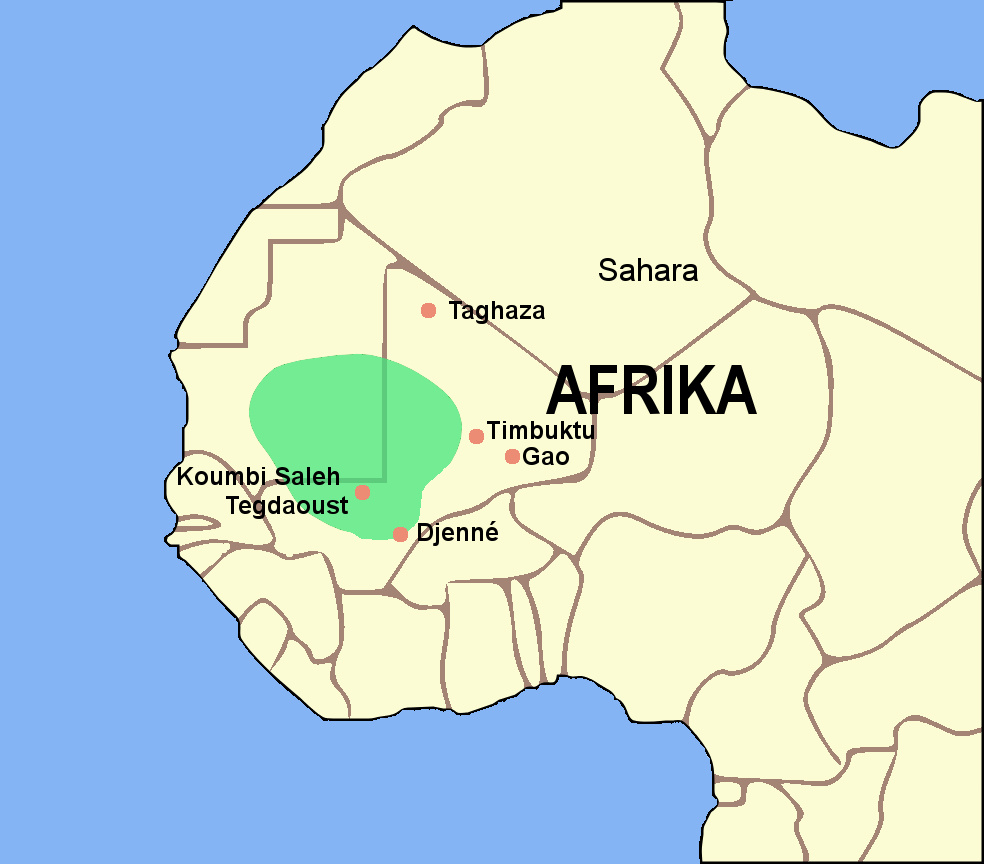
The Ghana Empire at its greatest extent, c. 1050

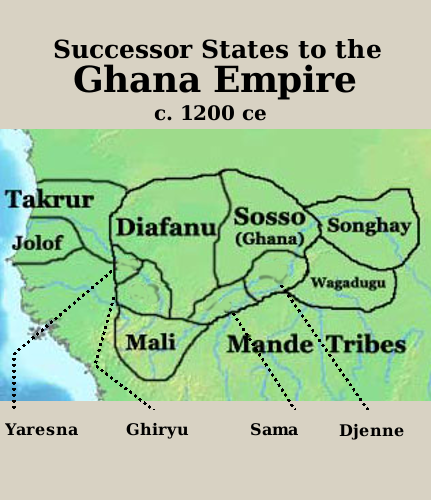
The successor states to the Ghana Empire c. 1200

Influence of the Kanem Empire c. 1200

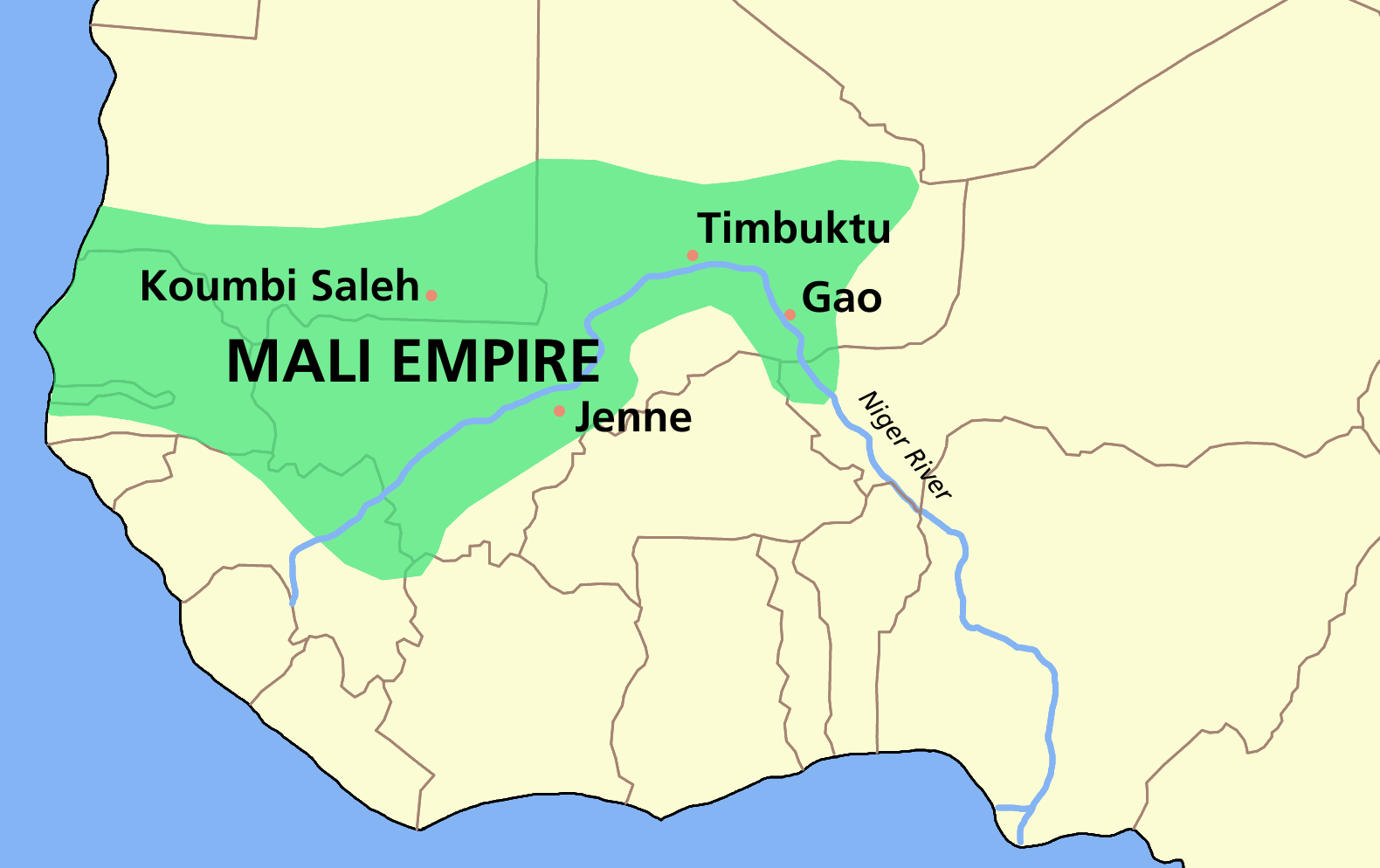
Extent of the Mali Empire, c. 1350

Approximate extent of the Mali Empire, next to the Songhai Empire, c. 1350

Constituent states of the Wolof Empire.

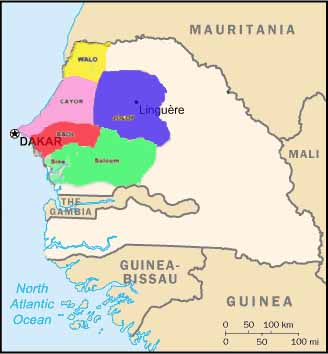
Constituent states of the Wolof Empire, c. 1400

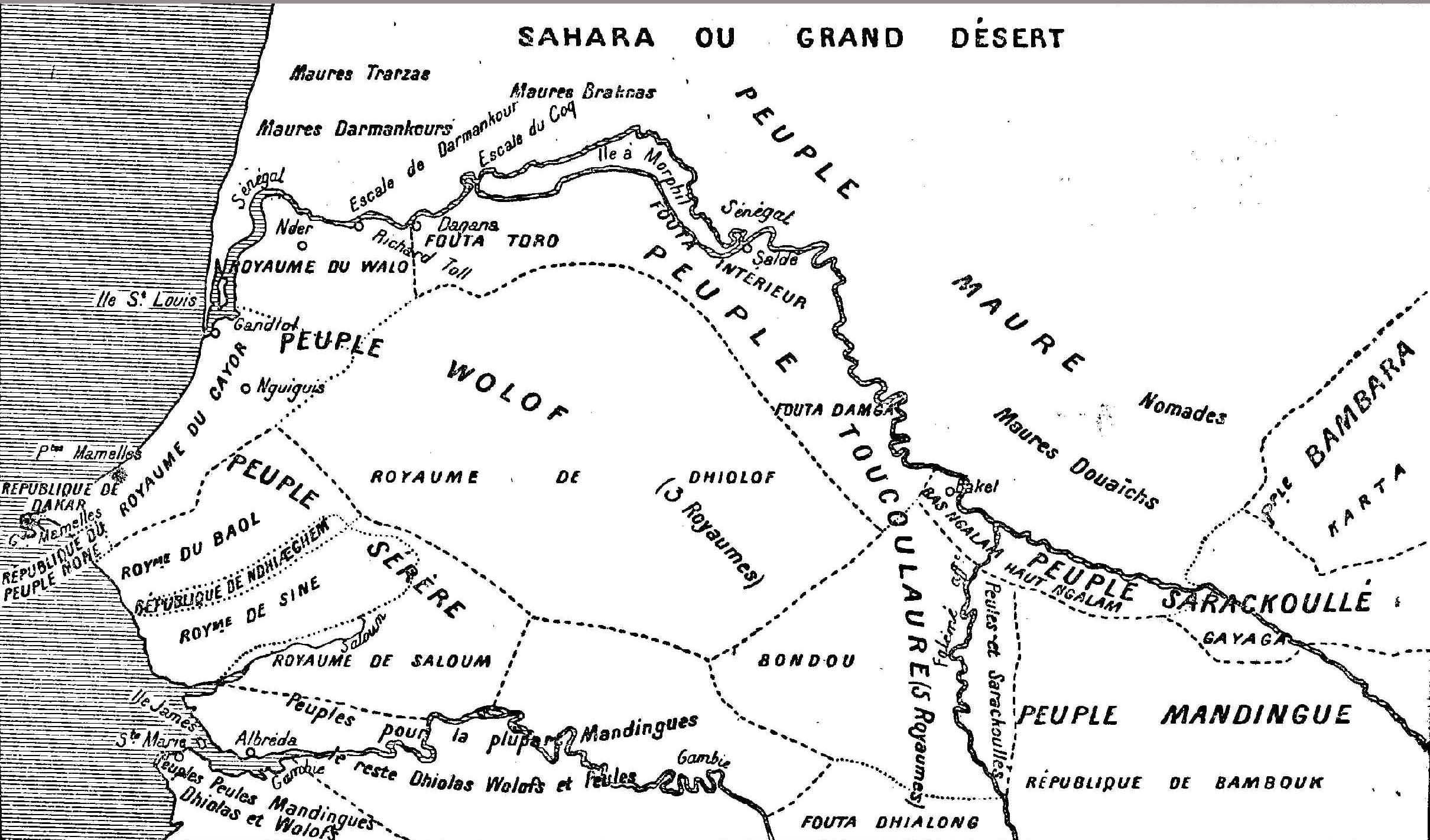
Carte des peuplades du Sénégal de l'abbé Boilat (1853): an ethnic map of Senegal at the time of French colonialism. The pre-colonial states of Baol, Sine and Saloum are arrayed along the southwest coast, with the inland areas marked "Peuple Sérère".

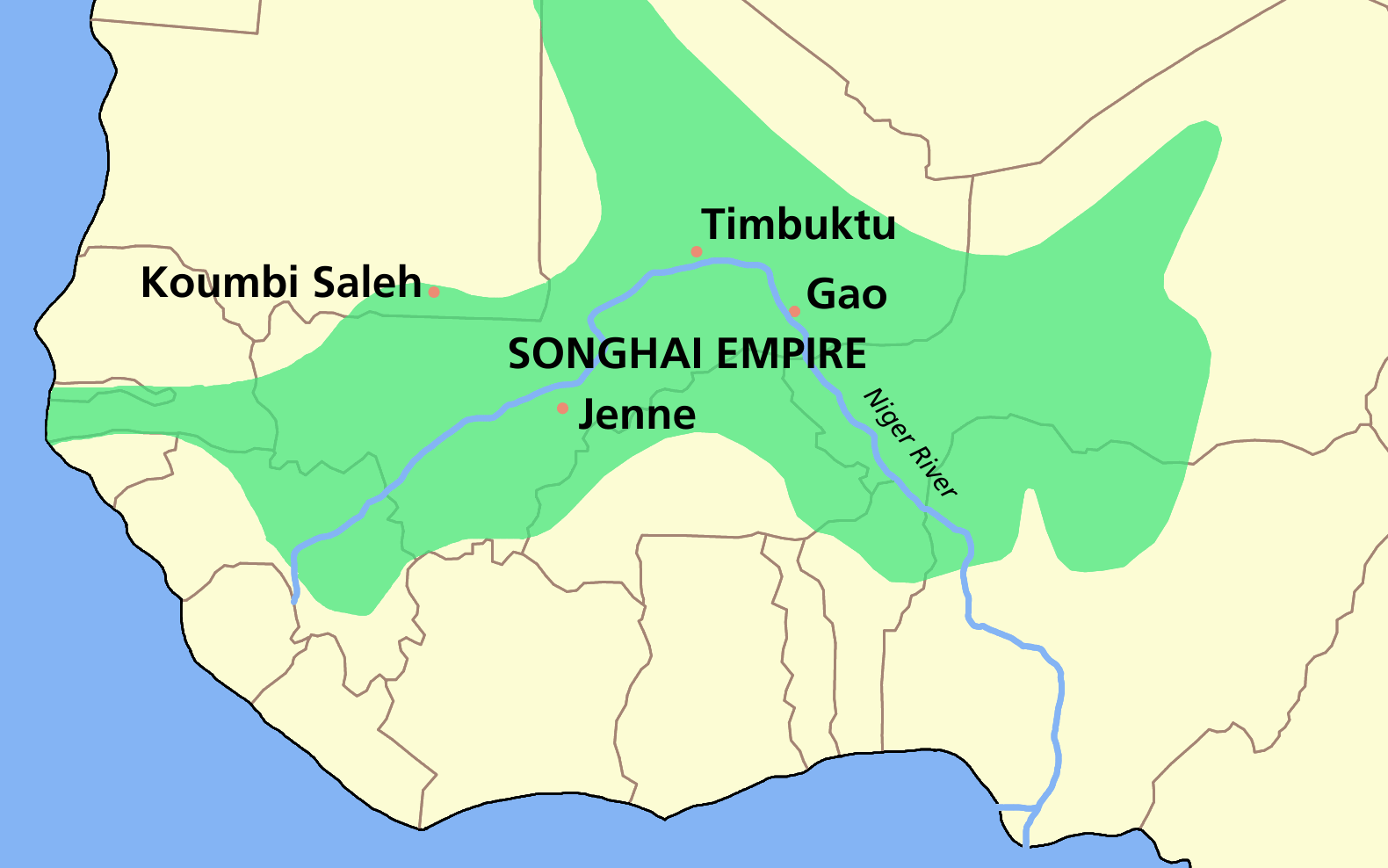
The Songhai Empire, c. 1500

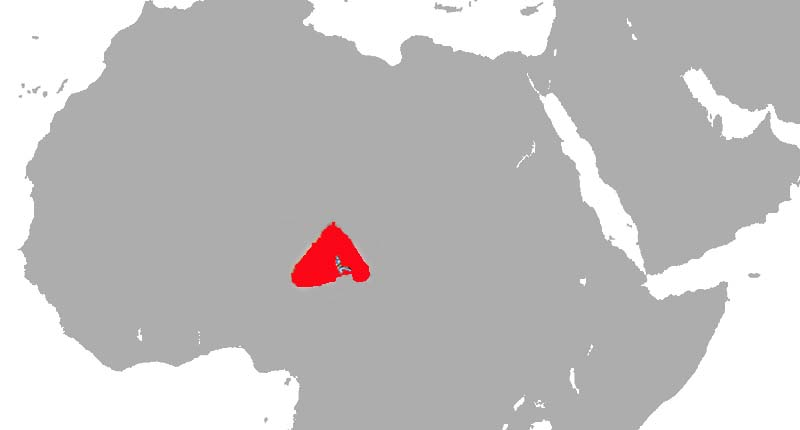
Bornu Empire territory by 1500

The Mali Empire, the Songhai Empire and Mossi kingdoms, 1530

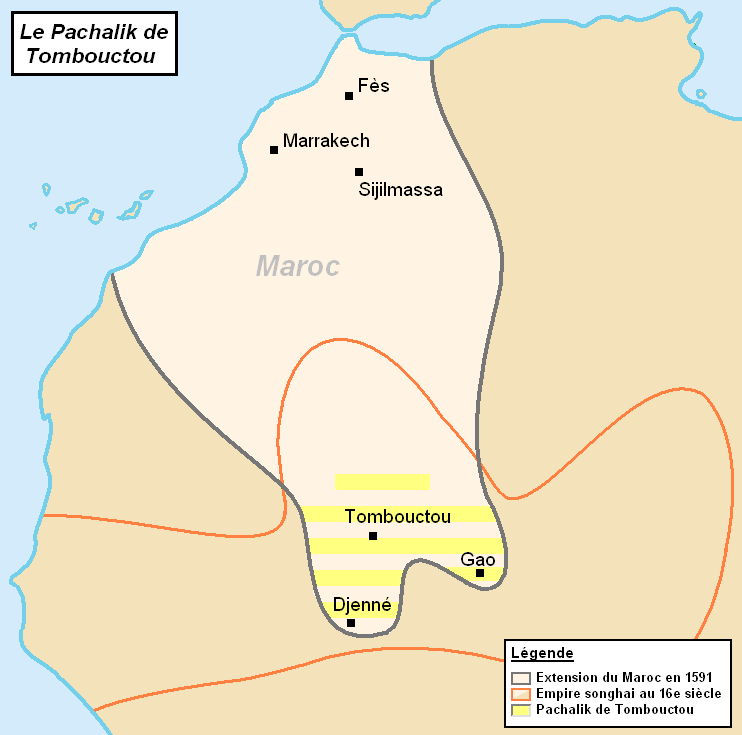
Map of the Pashalik of Timbuktu (yellow-striped) as part of the Saadi dynasty of Morocco (outlined black) within the Songhai Empire (outlined red), c. 1591

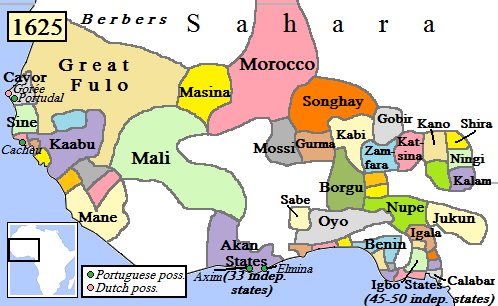
The Mali Empire and surrounding states, c. 1625

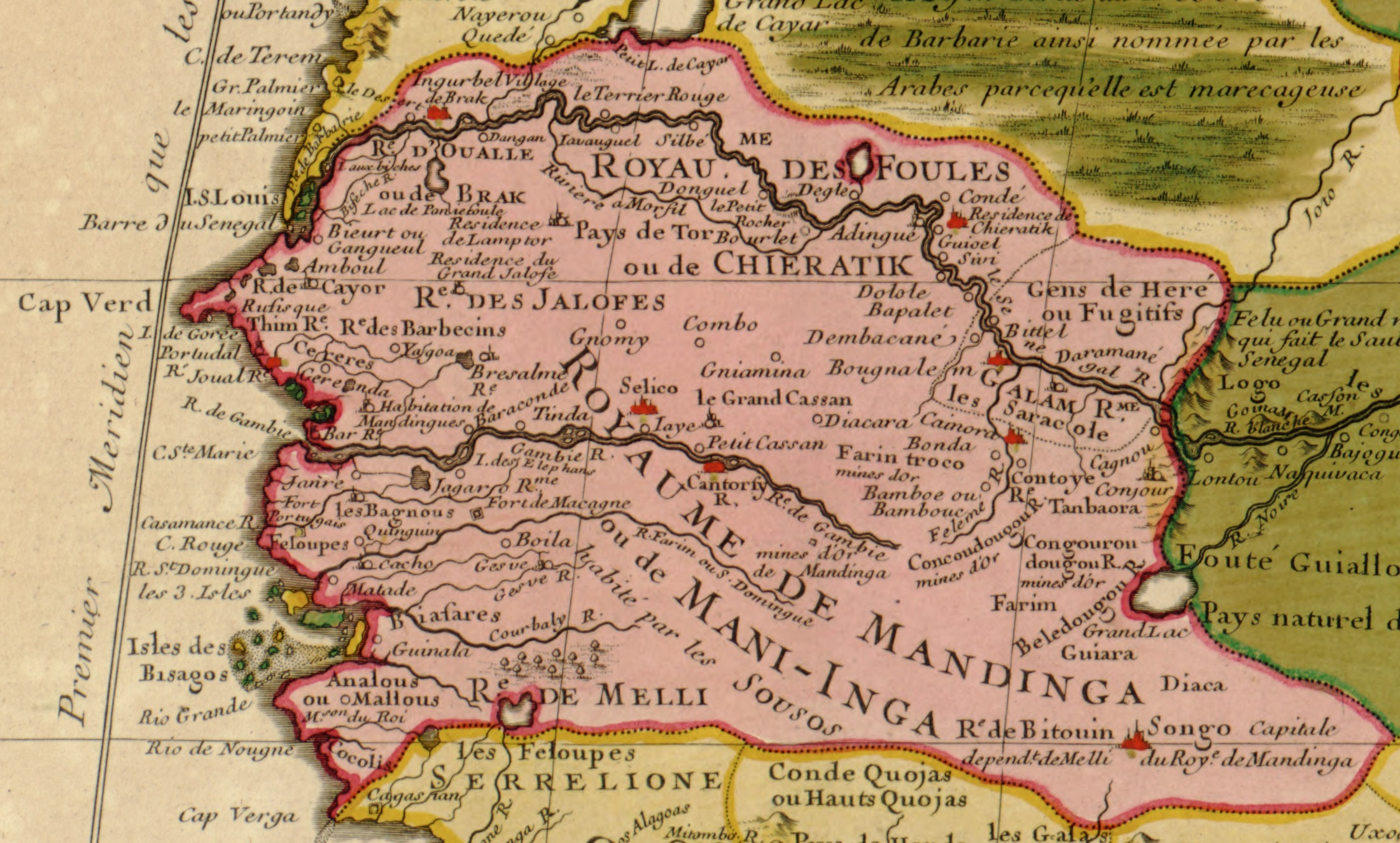
Senegambia, c. 1707. Waalo marked as Re. D'Oualle in the upper left.

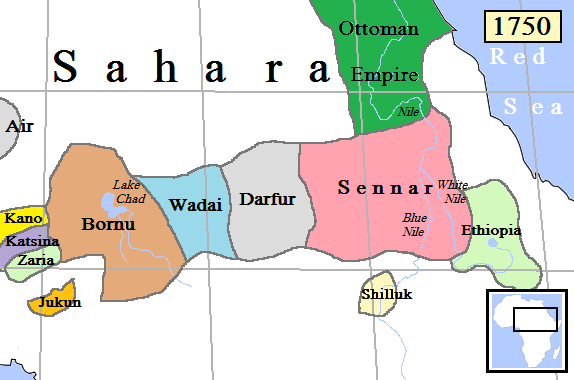
Bornu Empire and eastern Sahelian kingdoms, c. 1750

The extent of the Bornu Empire, c. 1750

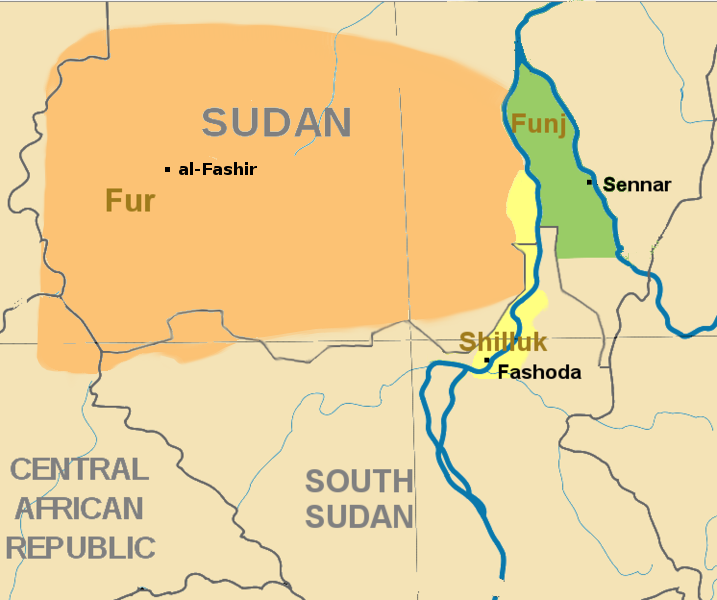
Shilluk Kingdom (yellow) and its neighbors, c. 1800

Bornu Empire in 1810

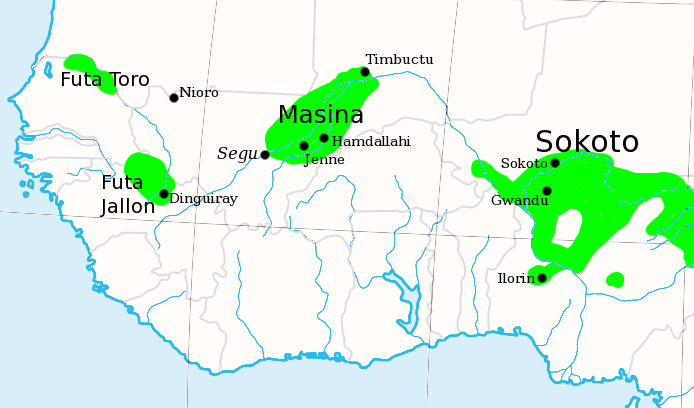
The Fulani Jihad States of West Africa, c. 1830

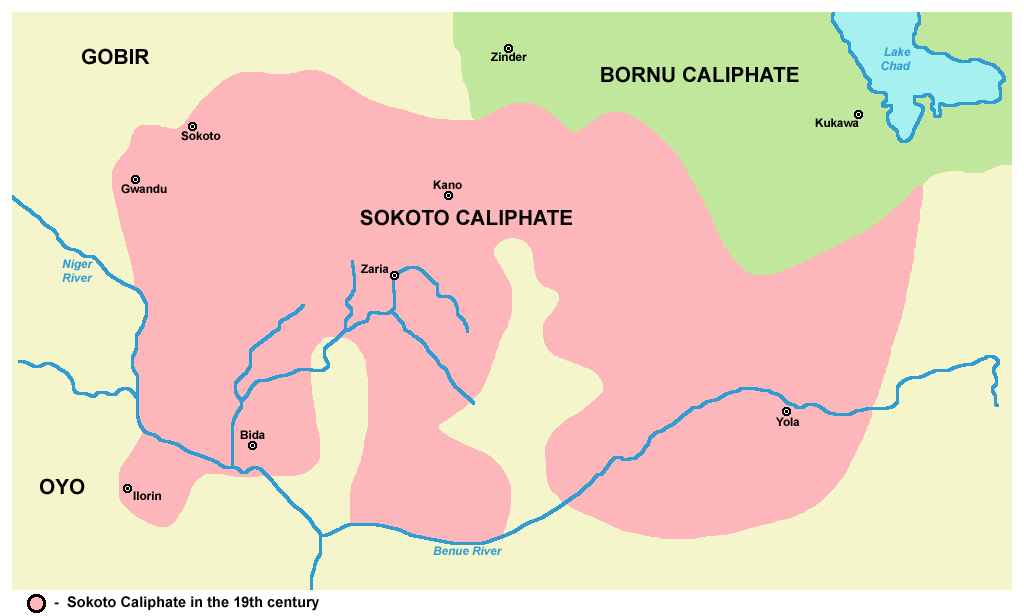
Sokoto Caliphate, 19th century

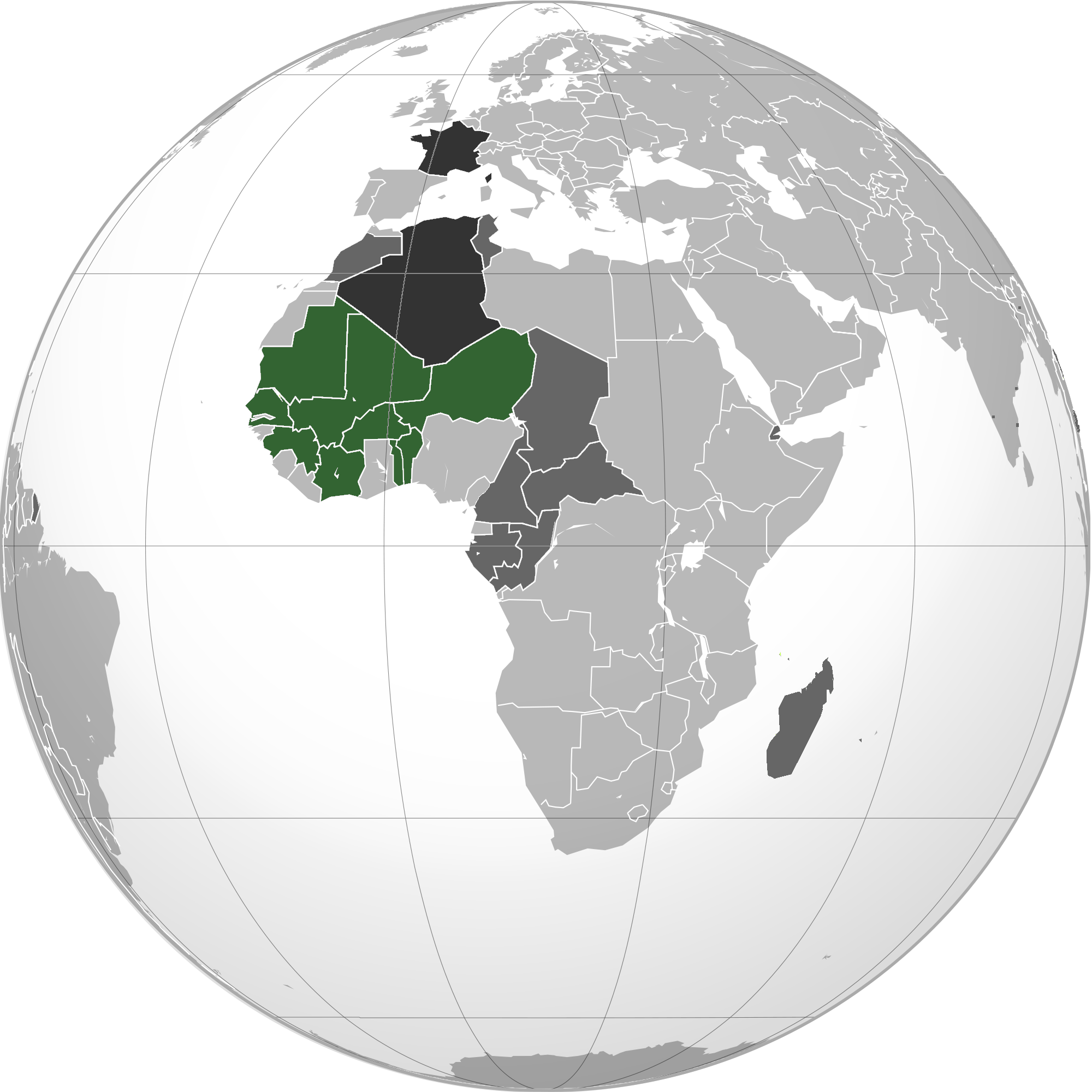
French West Africa (in green) after World War II, and other French possessions (in dark grey).

Major slave trading regions of West Africa, 15th–19th centuries

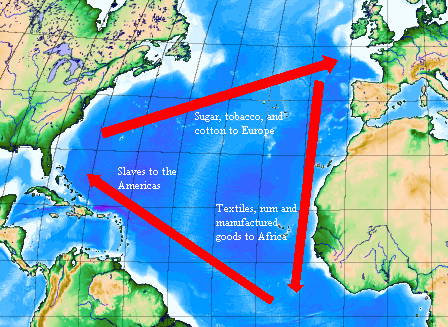
Depiction of the classical model of the triangular trade.

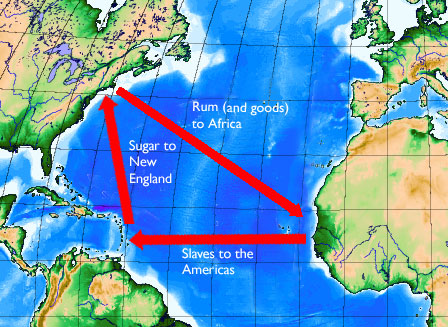
Depiction of the triangular trade of slaves, sugar, and rum with New England instead of Europe as the third corner.
