= The African Children's Educational Trust =

UK-based charity

The African Children's Educational Trust (A-CET) is a charity that helps to support education of African children through provision of scholarships and upgrading community elementary rural schools. By 2012 A-CET had built or upgraded nine schools in Northern Ethiopia. The charity was founded in 1997 by David Stables.

== A-CET schools ==
=== Aderak Full Elementary School ===
A-CET upgraded a local school in the Tigray Region of Northern Ethiopia in 2005, it is now a full elementary school with eight grades.

=== Adibaekel Full Elementary School ===
This school was officially opened October 2010.

=== Adihana Full Elementary School ===
This school was completed in 2007. It is a high quality junior school of four grades and can accommodate up to 400 students in one shift.

=== Dansa Full Elementary School ===
This school brings closer access and better long-term educational facilities to over 400 vulnerable rural students.

=== Gumselasa Full Elementary School ===
Originally two local built dark classrooms plus a shack with less than 100 students, this now has eight classrooms basically furnished, and is a full elementary school accommodating for over 400 youngsters from grades 1 to 8.

=== Hagere Selam Full Elementary School ===
Currently this school has grades 1–5 with planned grades up to 8 and a capacity of 500 students. Two thirds of the students at this school are female.

=== Adiba'ekel Full Elementary ===
Currently the school has only three grades. To continue any education children have to walk for well over an hour one-way to nearby Mynebri. This project started in December 2009 and will bring a proper school closer to a village community that really needs it to give their children a chance for a better future. Scheduled opening is planned for 26 September 2010.

=== Abinet Church School ===
This residential school attached to St. Michael's Cathedral in Mek'ele, has about 112 youngsters, over a third of whom are blind or otherwise disabled, some doubly afflicted.

The church is their only refuge and offers them security and a life-times employment. This project included seven dormitory blocks, a shower and separate latrine block plus a washing area. From start to finish this took less than six months and included strong bunk beds and furnishings for all boys.

=== Zibane Albe School ===
The Ziban Albe (Hilltop) school in Hiwane was opened in April 2012. This was the largest school project of the charity with 20 classrooms in five blocks. The school has a solar powered computer classroom.
