= Promoting Equality in African Schools =

UK-based charity

Promoting Equality in African Schools (PEAS) is a UK-based charity that builds, develops and runs low fee secondary schools in Uganda and Zambia.

== Overview ==
PEAS was founded in 2008 by social entrepreneur John Rendel, a Teach First graduate, after visiting Uganda as a student and discovering the huge need for secondary education following the Ugandan governments' free universal primary education (UPE) policy. A similar trend across African has seen a boost in primary enrolment yet demand for secondary education is largely unmet: only about 23% of girls and 27% of boys are enrolled at secondary level, largely due to a lack of schools.

John Rendel, who has won an Unltd Award for Social Entrepreneurship was named in the Courvoisier Future 500 as one of five young leaders in the public and social sectors, founded Promoting Equality in African Schools (PEAS) in 2004

PEAS has teams in the UK, Uganda and Zambia, working to both raise money (in the UK) and implement the PEAS SmartAid approach. As a result, there are currently 22 schools across the PEAS network in Uganda and Zambia, with several new schools under construction, including one in Zambia. The existing PEAS schools are:

- Onwards and Upwards Secondary School
- Forest High School
- Sarah Ntiiro High School
- Kiira View Secondary School
- Green Shoots Secondary School
- Lamwo Kuc Ki Gen High School
- Hibiscus High School
- Pioneer High School

== Bridges to Africa ==
Bridges to Africa is a national sponsored walk organised by PEAS, involving students from schools across London and the UK that has been running since 2006. Students join to complete 10 km bridge walks in London, Manchester and Birmingham. The money raised by students is used to help build new affordable secondary schools in Uganda and Zambia through the charity. In the past, the event has been attended by then Chancellor of the Exchequer Gordon Brown and Channel 4 new presenter Jon Snow. The walk takes place yearly, in May.
