= Scrubs Magazine =

American lifestyle magazine

- Frequency: Quarterly
- First issue: November 15, 2009
- Country: United States
- Based in: Santa Monica, California
- Language: English
- Website: scrubsmag.com

Scrubs Magazine is a lifestyle magazine and website for nurses, which premiered November 15, 2009. The quarterly magazine, which covers a range of lifestyle topics including beauty, money, style, health, and wellness, is audited by Business Publications Audit (BPA) Worldwide. Scrubs magazine has a paid circulation of 371,082 for the period ending December 31, 2011. It is distributed to select nursing students, VIP nursing school administrators, key nursing associations, and over 1,500 nursing apparel stores nationwide.

The Scrubs website features breaking news in the medical field, industry news, and conversations with nurse influencers. It has an average monthly traffic of 2 million. Its social channels include: Funny Nurses, Scrubs Magazine, Men in Nursing, Soy Enfermer, Student Nurses and has an average follower base of 5 million users.

== Concept ==
Strategic Partners, Inc. (SPI) – a nursing apparel and footwear company in the United States and manufacturer/distributor of scrubs – is the Publisher. The concept for Scrubs was created by Michael Singer of SPI now Careismatic Brands.
