= Bob Geldof discography =

This is the discography of solo recordings by the Irish singer-songwriter Bob Geldof, who is also known as the lead vocalist of the new wave band the Boomtown Rats, which performed from 1977 to 1985 and reformed in 2013.

== Solo albums ==
Year	Title	Peak chart positions									
Year	Title	UK	AUS	AUT	GER	IRE	NL	NOR	SWE	SWI	US
1986	Deep in the Heart of Nowhere: Released: 24 November 1986; Label: Mercury (UK) / Atlantic (US)	79	—	—	27	—	—	3	18	15	130
1990	The Vegetarians of Love: Released: 23 July 1990; Label: Mercury	21	43	27	15	—	37	—	—	20	—
1992	The Happy Club: Released: 5 October 1992; Label: Mercury (UK) / Atlantic (US)	—	91	—	60	—	—	—	—	39	—
2001	Sex, Age & Death: Released: 1 October 2001; Label: Eagle Records	134	116	—	—	—	—	—	—	—	—
2011	How to Compose Popular Songs That Will Sell: Released: 7 February 2011; Label: Mercury	89	—	—	—	87	—	—	—	—	—
"—" denotes a release that did not chart.

== Compilation albums ==
Year	Title	Peak chart positions
Year	Title	UK
1994	Loudmouth – The Best of Bob Geldof & The Boomtown Rats: includes solo recordings and The Boomtown Rats songs; Released: July 1994; Label: Vertigo	10
2005	Great Songs of Indifference: The Anthology 1986-2001: Box Set including the first 4 solo albums; Released: 2005; Label: Mercury	—
"—" denotes a release that did not chart.

== Singles ==
Year	Title	Chart positions									Album
Year	Title	UK	AUS	GER	IRE	NL	NOR	SWE	SWI	US	Album
1986	"This Is the World Calling"	25	93	28	2	29	1	10	18	82^{[A]}	Deep in the Heart of Nowhere
1987	"Love Like a Rocket"	61	—	—	21	—	—	—	—	—	Deep in the Heart of Nowhere
1987	"Heartless Heart"	—	—	—	—	—	—	—	—	—	Deep in the Heart of Nowhere
1987	"I Cry Too"	—	—	—	—	—	—	—	—	—	Deep in the Heart of Nowhere
1987	"In the Pouring Rain"	—	—	—	—	—	—	—	—	—	Deep in the Heart of Nowhere
1990	"The Great Song of Indifference"	15	25	20	7	16	—	—	—	—	Vegetarians of Love
1990	"Love or Something"	86	74	55	—	—	—	—	—	—^{[B]}	Vegetarians of Love
1990	"A Gospel Song"	—	—	—	—	—	—	—	—	—	Vegetarians of Love
1992	"Room 19 (Sha La La La Lee)"	78	143	53	—	—	—	—	—	—	Happy Club
1992	"My Hippy Angel"	100	143	—	—	—	—	—	—		Happy Club
1993	"The Happy Club"	—	—	—	—	—	—	—	—	—	Happy Club
1993	"Yeah, Definitely"	—	—	—	—	—	—	—	—	—	Happy Club
1994	"Crazy"	65	167	72	—	—	—	—	—	—	Loudmouth – The Best of Bob Geldof & The Boomtown Rats
1996	"Rat Trap" (Dustin & Geldof)	—	—	—	1	—	—	—	—	—	
2002	"Pale White Girls"	—	—	—	—	—	—	—	—	—	Sex Age & Death
2011	"Silly Pretty Thing"	146	—	—	—	—	—	—	—	—	How to Compose Popular Songs That Will Sell
2011	"Here's to You"	—	—	—	—	—	—	—	—	—	How to Compose Popular Songs That Will Sell

== Notes ==
- A "This Is the World Calling" also charted at #23 on Billboard Mainstream Rock Tracks Chart.
- B "Love or Something" charted at #24 on Billboard Modern Rock Tracks Chart.
