= Loudmouth – The Best of Bob Geldof and the Boomtown Rats =

Greatest hits album by The Boomtown Rats
- Released: 27 June 1994
- Genre: Rock
- Length: 69:20
- Label: Vertigo

Singles from Loudmouth
- 1. "Crazy" Released: 18 April 1994

Professional ratings
Review scores
Source	Rating
Allmusic	4.5/5 stars

Loudmouth – The Best of Bob Geldof and the Boomtown Rats is a 1994 greatest hits compilation album from Bob Geldof and the Boomtown Rats, consisting mostly of Boomtown Rats material but also some of Geldof's solo work. It peaked at No. 10 in the UK Albums Chart in July 1994.

"Crazy" was a previously unreleased Geldof track, and was released in the UK as a single from this album.

In 1997, the album was released by Columbia Records in the US and Vertigo Records in Canada as Great Songs of Indifference - The Best of Bob Geldof & the Boomtown Rats, with a few substituted songs.

== Track listing ==
All songs were written by Bob Geldof, except where noted.

1. "I Don't Like Mondays" (1979) – 4:17 from The Fine Art of Surfacing
2. "This is the World Calling" (1986) (Geldof, Raymond Doom) – 4:23 from Deep in the Heart of Nowhere
3. "Rat Trap" (1978) – 4:51 from A Tonic for the Troops
4. "The Great Song of Indifference" (1990) – 4:35 from The Vegetarians of Love
5. "Love or Something" (1990) (Geldof, David A. Stewart) – 4:32 from The Vegetarians of Love
6. "Banana Republic" (1980) (Pete Briquette, Geldof) – 3:29 from Mondo Bongo
7. "Crazy" (1994) (Geldof, Doom, Olle Romo) – 4:29 Previously unreleased
8. "The Elephants Graveyard" (1981) – 3:42 from Mondo Bongo
9. "Someone's Looking at You" (1980) – 4:22 from The Fine Art of Surfacing
10. "She's So Modern" (1978) (Geldof, Johnny Fingers) – 2:56 from A Tonic for the Troops
11. "House on Fire" (1982) – 4:46 from V Deep
12. "The Beat of the Night" (1986) – 5:06 from Deep in the Heart of Nowhere
13. "Diamond Smiles" (1979) – 3:49 from The Fine Art of Surfacing
14. "Like Clockwork" (1978) (Geldof, Briquette, Simon Crowe) – 3:38 from A Tonic for the Troops
15. "Room 19 (Sha La La La Lee)" (1992) – 3:41 from The Happy Club
16. "Mary of the 4th Form" (1977) – 3:30 from The Boomtown Rats
17. "Lookin' After No. 1" (1977) – 3:08 from The Boomtown Rats
- Tracks 1, 3, 6, 8, 9, 10, 11, 13, 14, 16, 17 - The Boomtown Rats
- Tracks 2, 4, 5, 7, 12, 15 - Bob Geldof

Great Songs of Indifference substitutes some of the above songs for the following Boomtown Rats songs:
5. "Never in a Million Years" (1982) – 3:48 from V Deep
11. "Up All Night" (1981) – 3:36 from V Deep
12. "Rain" (1984) – 4:13 from In the Long Grass (North American version)
While "Rain" is listed on the packaging, at least one Canadian CD pressing actually contains the original version, "Dave."

== Singles ==
"Crazy" / "Room 19 (Sha La La La Lee)" (Live) / "The Beat Of The Night" (Live) / "Rat Trap" (Live) (UK, April 1994)
"Crazy" / "Mary Of The 4th Form" (Live) / "Looking After Number One" (Live) / "Joey's On The Street" (Live) (1994) (UK Limited edition release)
"Crazy" / "Looking After Number 1" (Live) / "The Beat Of The Night" (Live) / "Room 19 (Sha La La La Lee)" (Live) (EU, May 1994)
