= The Best of The Boomtown Rats =

Greatest hits album by The Boomtown Rats
- Released: June 2004
- Genre: Rock
- Length: 1:18:50
- Label: Universal Records

The Boomtown Rats chronology
Loudmouth – The Best of Bob Geldof and the Boomtown Rats (1994)	The Best of The Boomtown Rats (2004)	Back to Boomtown: Classic Rats Hits (2013)

The Best of the Boomtown Rats featured 19 of The Boomtown Rats best known work. A DVD was also available.

The compilation album peaked at No. 43 in the UK Albums Chart in February 2005.

== Track listing ==
1. "She's So Modern"
2. "Mary of the 4th Form"
3. "Rat Trap"
4. "Lookin' After No. 1"
5. "When the Night Comes"
6. "Someone's Looking at You"
7. "Joey's on the Street Again"
8. "Banana Republic"
9. "Dave"
10. "I Don't Like Mondays"
11. "Like Clockwork"
12. "(I Never Loved) Eva Braun"
13. "Neon Heart"
14. "Never in a Million Years"
15. "Diamond Smiles"
16. "Drag Me Down"
17. "I Can Make It (If You Can)"
18. "The Elephant's Graveyard (Guilty)"
19. "Fall Down"

== DVD ==
=== Promo videos ===
1. "Lookin' After No. 1"
2. "She's So Modern"
3. "Like Clockwork"
4. "Rat Trap"
5. "I Don't Like Mondays"
6. "Diamond Smiles"
7. "Someone's Looking at You"
8. "Banana Republic"
9. "The Elephant's Graveyard"
10. "Never in a Million Years"
11. "House on Fire"
12. "Dave"
13. "Tonight"
14. "Drag Me Down"
15. "A Hold on Me"

=== Live Hammersmith Apollo 1984 ===
1. "Intro"
2. "The Elephant's Graveyard"
3. "Charmed Lives"
4. "Lucky"
5. "Neon Heart"
6. "Someone's Looking at You"
7. "Dave"
8. "A Hold of Me"
9. "I Don't Like Mondays"
10. "Talk in Code"
11. "Rat Trap"
12. "Drag Me Down"
13. "Lookin' After No. 1"

=== Bonus material ===
1. "The Music Machine" (1977)
2. "Lookin' After No. 1" (1977)
3. "Mary of the 4th Form" (Top of the Pops, 1977)
4. "Arnold Lane" (6.55 special 1982)
5. "Do They Know it's Christmas?" (The Tube 1985)
6. "News Flash" (1980)
7. "Keep It Up" (live)
8. "Like Clockwork" (live)
9. Self Aid (1986 - "Joey on Streets Again")
