= The Fine Art of Surfacing =

Studio album by the Boomtown Rats
- Released: 5 October 1979
- Recorded: November 1978 – February 1979
- Studios: Phonogram, Hilversum, Netherlands
- Genres: New wave; pop
- Length: 40:13
- Labels: Ensign; Mulligan; Columbia; Mercury
- Producers: Robert John "Mutt" Lange; Phil Wainman

The Boomtown Rats chronology
| A Tonic for the Troops (1978) | The Fine Art of Surfacing (1979) | Mondo Bongo (1981) |

The Fine Art of Surfacing is the third studio album by the Irish rock band the Boomtown Rats, released on 5 October 1979. The album peaked at No. 7 on the UK Albums Chart in 1979.

"I Don't Like Mondays" was released as the album's first single on 13 July 1979 and reached No. 1 on the UK Singles Chart. The song refers to Brenda Ann Spencer's killing spree, which occurred on Monday, 29 January 1979 in San Diego, California. The album also produced the singles "Diamond Smiles" and "Someone's Looking at You".

The Boomtown Rats travelled around the United States leading up to The Fine Art of Surfacing, drumming up publicity in the country. During this time the band learned much about both American life and breaking into the American music market. The album takes a serious approach in looking at American society in songs like "I Don't Like Mondays" and "Diamond Smiles", while other times looking at it in a downright silly and mocking manner, as in songs like "Nothing Happened Today" and "Having My Picture Taken".

In 2005, the album was re-released (it had previously been released but fell out of print quickly), digitally remastered by Bob Geldof and Pete Briquette with bonus tracks, mostly B-sides from various eras, that delve more deeply into the Rats' musical influences.

== Reception ==
Professional ratings
Review scores
| Source | Rating |
|---|---|
| AllMusic | 4/5 stars |
| Christgau's Record Guide | B− |
| The Irish Times | 4/5 stars |
| The Rolling Stone Album Guide | 2.5/5 stars |
| Smash Hits | 3/10 |

David Fricke of Rolling Stone highlighted the album's musical diversity, writing that "much of the Boomtown Rats' smarmy charm comes from an elusiveness that defies categorization because it draws from dozens of sources but embraces none."

== Track listing ==
All songs written by Bob Geldof unless otherwise indicated.

=== 1979 Vinyl Release ===
Side A

1. "Someone's Looking at You" – 4:22
2. "Diamond Smiles" – 3:49
3. "Wind Chill Factor (Minus Zero)" – 4:35
4. "Having My Picture Taken" (Geldof, Pete Briquette) – 3:18
5. "Sleep (Fingers' Lullaby)" (Johnnie Fingers) – 5:30

* A hidden track (with lyrics including "that's not funny, I'm not laughing"), on the original LP playing through to the run-out groove.

Side B

1. "I Don't Like Mondays" (Geldof, Johnnie Fingers) – 4:16
2. "Nothing Happened Today" – 3:18
3. "Keep It Up" (Geldof, Gerry Cott) – 3:39
4. "Nice N Neat" – 2:50
5. "When the Night Comes" – 5:00

* A hidden track of a warped voice saying "That concludes episode 3. We will return shortly.."

=== 2005 re-release bonus tracks ===
1. "Episode 3" (a combination of both hidden tracks on the vinyl release) –1:10
2. "Real Different" (B-side of "Elephant's Graveyard") – 2:39
3. "How Do You Do?" (B-side of "Like Clockwork") – 2:39
4. "Late Last Night" (B-side of "Diamond Smiles") – 2:43
5. "Nothing Happened Today" (Live in Cardiff) – 3:44

== Personnel ==
Credits adapted from album liner notes and AllMusic.

The Boomtown Rats

- Bob Geldof – vocals, saxophone
- Pete Briquette – bass, vocals
- Gerry Cott – guitar
- Johnnie Fingers – keyboards, vocals
- Simon Crowe – drums, vocals
- Garry Roberts – guitar, vocals

Additional musicians

- Fiachra Trench – string arrangement on "I Don't Like Mondays"

Technical

- Arun Chakraverty – mastering
- Fin Costello – photography
- Robert John "Mutt" Lange – production
- Chuck Loyola – inner sleeve artwork and design
- Lorne Miller – cover artwork and design
- Tony Platt – engineering
- Phay Taylor – lighting
- Phil Wainman – production on "I Don't Like Mondays"

== Charts ==
| Chart (1979–80) | Peak position |
|---|---|
| Australian Albums (Kent Music Report) | 11 |
| Canada Top Albums/CDs (RPM) | 6 |
| Dutch Albums (Album Top 100) | 33 |
| German Albums (Offizielle Top 100) | 35 |
| New Zealand Albums (RMNZ) | 10 |
| Norwegian Albums (VG-lista) | 7 |
| Swedish Albums (Sverigetopplistan) | 10 |
| UK Albums (Official Charts) | 7 |
| US Billboard 200 | 103 |

== Certifications ==
| Region | Certification | Certified units/sales |
|---|---|---|
| Canada (Music Canada) | Platinum | 100,000^{^} |
| United Kingdom (BPI) | Gold | 100,000^{^} |
^{^} Shipments figures based on certification alone.
