= Humanitarianism in Africa =

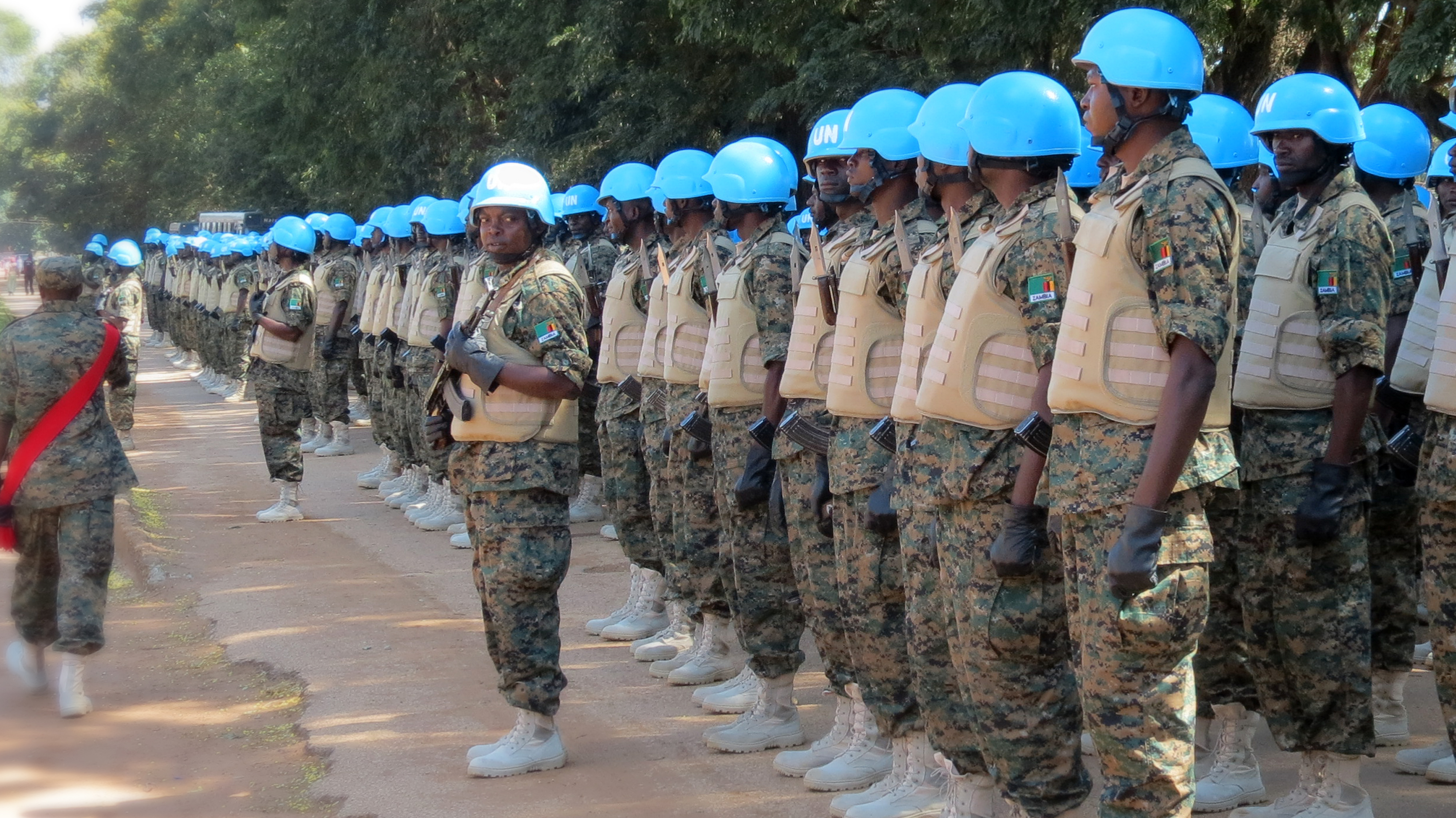
UN peacekeeping in Africa has its origins in humanitarian ideology.

Humanitarianism in Africa refers to the intentions and actions of people, nations, and organizations to alleviate human suffering in Africa. Humanitarian policies have focused on improving problems in Africa such as poverty, poor-health, corruption, and ethnic/inter-state conflict. Prominent entities which engage in humanitarian action in Africa include but are not limited to: foreign nations like the United States (US), domestic nations like South Africa, international organizations like the World Bank, the International Monetary Fund (IMF), and the United Nations (UN), Non-Governmental Organizations (NGOs) like the Red Cross and Doctors Without Borders, and even personal celebrities like Bono. Prominent methods of promoting humanitarianism in Africa have been foreign aid, humanitarian intervention, and UN sanctioned peacekeeping.

Starting in the 1960s, aid to Africa has evolved in focus from infrastructure to poverty to neoliberal stabilization and structural adjustment, to governance to glamour aid. Broadly, foreign aid encompasses emergency aid, charity-based aid, and systematic aid. Emergency and charity-based aid are often shorter term aid aimed at alleviating immediate suffering from events like natural disaster or famine. Conversely, systematic aid from foreign nations and development organizations is long term aid, via concessionary loans or grants, focused on solving foundational problems like poverty or institutional reform. Although emergency aid has helped prevent short term suffering in Africa, systematic aid has harmed Africans by increasing corruption and poverty. Unconditional aid to Africa has been largely proliferated by corrupt officials who engage in private consumption instead of public investment. Aid motivated corruption reduces investment, which in the long-term has suppressed many countries' economic growth. This lower growth has led to increased poverty in Africa, which causes donors to send more aid creating a vicious cycle of aid and poverty.

Another method to promote humanitarianism has been through humanitarian intervention. This method involves foreign nations or multilateral organizations threatening or using force to prevent or stop violent conflicts. Humanitarian intervention does not require the consent of all parties and is more focused on stopping conflict and not long-term nation building. An example of humanitarian intervention in Africa was the UN (UNOSOM) and US (UNITAF) missions to Somalia in 1993. However, the more prominent method of humanitarianism in Africa has been through UN sanctioned peacekeeping operations. These operations insert foreign troops into a post-conflict area in hopes of providing transitional stability. Their presence requires the consent of all parties and their ability to use force is usually restricted to self-defense. Since 1960, the UN has completed 25 peacekeeping missions in Africa, each unique with varying degrees of success. Some examples include ONUC in the Congo, UNAVEM in Angola, and UNAMIR in Rwanda. On balance, peacekeeping operations writ large have succeeded in achieving their mandate in 66% of cases. Their presence has reduced both civilian and military deaths during conflicts and has shortened and prevented conflicts from reemerging.

Although claiming a desire to alleviate suffering, humanitarianism in Africa has often done the opposite. By often embracing a white-man's burden mentality, humanitarian organizations have engaged in a form of neocolonialism in which they maintain control and influence over formal colonies in the name of benevolent development.

== Terms ==
=== Humanitarianism ===
Humanitarianism broadly defined is an informal ideology with the primary goal of alleviating human suffering. With roots in late 18th century enlightenment thinking, humanitarianism stresses the universality of human rights and the responsibility of "civilized" people's to sympathize with those suffering and to actively help. The International Committee of the Red Cross (ICRC) defines humanitarianism as "the independent, neutral, and impartial provision of relief to victims of armed conflict and natural disasters". In deploying relief, the ICRC follows seven principles: humanity, impartiality, neutrality, independence, voluntary service, unity, and universality. However, this definition and its principles have been contested, as humanitarianism in practice does not always follow these principles and has grown to encompass more long term political projects such as democracy promotion and economic development.

=== Aid ===
One way humanitarianism achieves its goals is through foreign based aid. This aid consists of three types: emergency aid, charity-based aid, and systematic aid. Emergency aid, or pure humanitarian aid, is short term aid from foreign governments or institutions given to local entities suffering from natural disasters or human conflicts. Charity-based aid comes from non-governmental organizations (NGOs) and can be directed towards locals to combat both short and long term issues. Conversely, systemic aid is solely focused on longer term pervasive issues and is made through direct government-to-government transfers, or through international institutions. Government-to-government transfers are termed bilateral aid, while aid from international institutions is termed multilateral aid. Systematic aid comes in two types, concessional loans or grants. Concessional loans are cheaper long-term loans given by countries or institutions at below market rate and are meant to be repaid, while grants are free economic resources not meant to be repaid.

=== Humanitarian intervention ===
Another way humanitarianism achieves its goals is through armed humanitarian intervention. Strictly defined, humanitarian intervention is when foreign states or international entities use or threaten military force on another state to end or prevent widespread human suffering within that state without the state's consent. What separates humanitarian intervention from other military conflicts is that it is motivated by humanitarian reasons to reduce suffering and that it occurs without the consent of the sovereign dominant authority. The goal of humanitarian intervention is to stop immediate violent conflict, not to explicitly promote political rights or change another country's political/social context. Humanitarian intervention is justified under international law through the Responsibility to Protect (R2P) doctrine, which obligates UN members to intervene when human rights abuses occur.

=== United Nations peacekeeping ===
However, much of humanitarian policy in Africa has been pursue via United Nations (UN) sanctioned peacekeeping missions. Peacekeeping is not explicitly humanitarian intervention because it assists in state transformation by stationing neutral foreign troops within a conflict area for an extended amount of time to promote stability. Peacekeeping generally follows three principles: major parties to the conflict must consent to a UN presence, UN troops are impartial to the conflict, and UN troops can only use force in self-defense or defense of the mandate. However, these principles are not always explicitly followed thus, missions can blur the line between humanitarian intervention and pure peacekeeping. For example, traditional "first-generation" peacekeeping requires the consent of both parties to a conflict to occur, a key difference from intervention. However, modern "third-generation" peacekeeping can take on a more militarized form through peace-enforcement in which mission troops enforce post-conflict peace agreements through the threat or use of force with or without both parties consent, aspects more similar to humanitarian intervention.

Ultimately, it is important to remember that wider humanitarian work has occurred without the use force, like NGOs or missionaries, meaning the strict definition of humanitarian intervention does not fully encompass all types of foreign interference for humanitarian reasons.

== Brief history ==
=== Foreign systematic aid ===
Foreign aid in Africa can trace its origins to post World War II reconstruction and the Bretton Woods conference of 1944. At this conference three important development organizations were founded: the World Bank, the International Monetary Fund, and the International Trade Organization. Designed to promote the stability of the post-war world economy, these organizations shifted their focus to Africa after the success of the US Marshall Plan in the 1950s to reconstruct war-torn western Europe. Aid in the 1960s focused on capital intensive infrastructure and industrial projects in Africa, because it was thought newly independent African countries were unlikely to invest in longer-term projects with a long term pay-off. By 1965, at least US$950 million in aid had been sent to Africa.

However, the 1970s saw an important shift from infrastructure-focused aid to poverty-focused aid. The oil crisis of 1973 led to economic recession and high inflation marked by unsustainable fuel and food prices throughout Africa. To remedy this, the US and the World Bank reoriented their aid programs towards social services, literacy programs, food programs and agriculture in lieu of long term infrastructure. Importantly, the 1970s marked another shift in that most African aid was now coming from the World Bank instead of the US.

The rise of neoliberal economics in the 1980s facilitated yet another change towards stabilization then structural adjustment in the same decade. Increases in floating loan rates after the 1979 oil crisis left African countries with a lot of concessionary loans unable to pay their debt obligations. 11 African countries ensued to default on their debt, leading to IMF restructuring the debt. In an effort to make developing African countries more economically resilient, aid programs now emphasized less government spending and free-market solutions to development, a model that had been working in China.

However, by 1990 economic growth in many African countries was either stagnating or in decline, with the cost to service debt higher than the actual aid going to countries. Blame for poor economic performance was placed on poor African governance, with aid now targeting pro-democratic government reforms such as improving civil service and election transparency. Importantly, during the Cold War western aid entities provided aid to corrupt African dictators, such as Zaire's Mobutu Sese Seko and Liberia's Samuel Doe, to gain their allegiance to combat Soviet expansion. With the end of the Cold War in 1991, aid was no longer motivated by anti-Soviet sentiment, and could be better targeted or even withheld. In fact, Africa's net Official Development Assistance (ODA) declined from a 1992 high of US$17 billion to US$12 billion by 1999.

Aid from 2000 onwards has continued to be characterized by pro-democratic government reforms as well as a rise in "glamour aid" where rich and popular influencers promote celebrity humanitarianism. Although this aid advocacy has increased awareness and funding for humanitarian causes, it has stifled nuanced analytical debate about the benefits and consequences of foreign aid.

=== Peacekeeping and humanitarian intervention ===
==== Overall peacekeeping efficacy ====
Although not all peacekeeping missions succeed, as the below examples illustrate, a majority of them have been found to succeed in accomplishing their humanitarian mandate. In analyzing peacekeeping missions after the Cold War, Dr. Lise Howard found that in at least 60% of cases peacekeeping made a positive difference, with around two thirds succeeding in fulfilling their mandate. More peacekeeping forces has been found to reduce civilian deaths and sexual assault in conflict areas, as well shorting the duration of conflict and preventing violence from reemerging after the conflict. It has also been found that more diverse peacekeeping forces result in less civilian and military casualties compared to less diverse forces. Peacekeeping missions also produce more stable post-conflict institutions and civil societies, through helping to reform legal, military, and government systems.

Since 1960, the UN has completed 25 peacekeeping missions in Africa. These missions have had varying degrees of success. Below are a few examples of peacekeeping missions in Africa to showcase their uniqueness and variability for success.

==== United Nations Operation in the Congo (ONUC) ====
After Congo gained independence from Belgium in 1960, political instability and infighting ensued. Various political factions vied for control, with members of the Congolese army revolting against the Lumumba government, killing both locals and Europeans in the process. Subsequently, the southern state of Katanga declared its independence from the Congo under the leadership of Moise Tshombe. To restore law and order, the UN sent what would be up to 20,000 personnel to the Congo to engage in peaceful enforcement of the Congo's territorial integrity. By January 1963, the Katanga rebellion has been stopped, and its territory reintegrated into the Congo. ONUC left the Congo in 1964 partly in response to Soviet opposition that the US had been using UN forces to promote its interests in the Congo. This is one of the primary critiques levied against UN peacekeeping, that is simply serves as a cover for Western Imperialism. The reintegration of Katanga, a state rich in minerals, by ONUC did directly benefit US controlled mineral companies in the Congo. However, on balance, preserving the territorial integrity of the Congo did save many lives compared to if ONUC had not happened at all, and therefore did accomplish its humanitarian mission.

==== United Nations Operation in Angola (UNAVEM II,III) ====
After Angola gained independence from Portugal in 1975, a bloody civil-war ensued between competing independence parties, the ruling communist MPLA and the rebel anti-communist UNITA party. A second UN Mission to Angola in 1991 was tasked with verifying Angola's first election and seeing the implementation of the Bicesse peace accords between the MPLA and UNITA. With only 350 military personnel and 400 election observers, this small mission lacked the resources to justify the election's integrity when UNITA rejected unfavorable results, leading to the conflict's resumption. With more than 300,000 people dying in this new phase of conflict, a broader UN mission to Angola was mandated in 1994 to pacify UNITA and provide humanitarian aid. Although comprising 7000 troops, this larger force was still not equipped to provide the necessary amount of aid and deterrence to stabilize the country. Lacking the needed resources, UNAVEM III left Angola in 1997, leaving behind an even more ineffective observation mission (MONUA) to replace it. It was only after the leader of the UNITA, Jonas Savimbi's, death in 2002 that fighting ended.

==== United Nations Operations in Rwanda (UNAMIR) ====
The 1993 United Nations Assistance Mission for Rwanda (UNAMIR) was mandated to help implement the Arusha Peace Accords, a ceasefire agreement designed to end the ethnic based civil war in Rwanda. UNAMIR was mandated with providing security around the capital of Kigali, providing security for refugees and displaced persons, demobilizing then integrating Hutu and Tutsi parties, and eventually overseeing planned future elections. In the beginning, the mission only received 2500 poorly trained and organized troops, many of whom lacked basic equipment. This under resourced force was unable and at times unwilling to protect Tutsi RPF forces from Hutu genocidaires. While some UNAMIR troops did use force to prevent conflict, many troops resisted the use of force due to a perception of a strict UN mandate for only allowing force in self-defense. Because of this, there was a belief among Rwanda soldiers that UNAMIR troops would not fire under any circumstances. Along with lacking resources and a stronger UN mandate, the humanitarian mission in Rwanda lacked strong continued support from powerful countries such as the US and Belgium. The US decided not to send troops into Rwanda out of fear of repeating the mistakes it had made two years earlier in Somalia where 19 US soldiers died. Similarly, once 10 UNAMIR soldiers from Belgium where killed, Belgium removed all its troops from Rwanda. Ultimately, lack of support from the international community led to UNAMIR failing, a consequence of which contributed to the deaths of over 800,000 people in Rwanda within a 100-day period.

== Areas of focus ==
=== Genocide ===
Genocide is the deliberate mass murder of individuals with a shared identity. The Rwandan Genocide resulted in the death of thousands of Rwandans. Media coverage was prevalent during the gruesome event. From April 6 to July 16, 1994, a mere 100 days, an estimated 800,000 to 1,000,000 Tutsis were believed to have been slaughtered. At height of the slaughtering, it was projected that six people were being slaughtered every minute. As a result of the extreme violence, there was great public outcries from other nations to put an end to the slaughtering. As a result of the genocide, Western interest in Africa was heightened, as well as humanitarian organizations. Unfortunately, while genocide continues to shock nations, many nations have accepted that this a characteristic of Africa. Genocide is often depicted as a common occurrence within the continent.

=== HIV/AIDS ===
HIV/AIDS is a serious epidemic in Africa which has claimed the lives of millions. It continues to be one of the leading causes of death amongst countries in Africa. Reported cases of HIV/AIDS have increased from 8 million to 34 million by the end of 2011 worldwide. At height of the HIV/AIDS epidemic in Sub-Saharan Africa, life expectancy began to drop in certain countries. The number of people being diagnosed with AIDS and dying from the illness continues to increase. In 2011, 23.5 million children and adults were estimated to be living with HIV/AIDS in sub-Saharan Africa. And in sub-Saharan Africa alone, 1.2 million children and adults have died due to the disease. The severe outbreak of HIV/AIDS called for immediate attention. A number of countries began to implemented large-scale prevention programs in order to contain the outbreaks. Despite having the largest prevention program in the world, South Africa is estimated to have had 370,000 new infections in 2012. Senegal however, has been successful in maintaining low HIV statistics among the population. The success of the country is attributed to early initiative and political factors.

=== Food insecurity ===
According to the USDA, food insecurity is separated into two categories: low food security and very low food security. Low food security is defined as reports of reduced food quality and variety, where as very low food security reflects reduced food intake. Food insecurity is a leading cause behind humanitarian efforts. Approximately 854 million people around the world are reported to live in food insecurity. Of this, 60% of these people live in sub-Saharan Africa or south Asia. Of the 600 million people residing in sub-Saharan Africa, 200 million people are chronically malnourished. Over 40 million children are malnourished while 50 million suffer from vitamin deficiency. Lack of proper nutrition can be attributed to governmental, social, or environmental factors. Individuals experience food insecurity may be dependent of food aid for survival, which may be provided through foreign aid.

On October 23, 2014, the United States Agency for International Development announced a $75 million food security program to aid Madagascar's chronic food insecurity problem. The USDA defines the programs as "a sign of the United States' renewed commitment to Madagascar".

== Critique of humanitarianism ==
Ethnocentrism is use of one's societal values to judge the values of another society. Ethnocentrism can also result in one using their as a blueprint for other cultures—ultimately causing one to pass judgment on the other culture. These judgments are often negative and detrimental.

Critics of foreign humanitarian efforts in Africa argue that Western society's obsession with "saving" Africa bear traces of ethnocentrism. Western ethnocentric perception of Africa results in it being viewed as less civilized and developed. Thus, these views perpetuate Africa's appearance as a continent composed of inferior countries. As a result, the continent Africa is painted as helpless without foreign intervention. Names of organizations, which call for Westerners to "save the children", reflect this notion

While Western efforts have good intentions, critics argue that movements paint Africa as helpless without Western aid. Many critics have also brought up the neglect of domestic humanitarian efforts. Media coverage often shows Western organizations aiding impoverished sub-Saharan countries, yet fail to acknowledge inter-country activism and efforts.

Furthermore, some argue that foreign aid were not beneficial to impoverished nations. It is argued that aid programs sponsored by rich countries merely shift food surpluses with the countries, thus causing it to be an ineffective form of aid. Western societies also encourage the education of African's yet "fail to encourage" them to return to their home continent.

The White Man's Burden

The term The White Man's Burden was coined to represent the duty of White race to bring Western society and education to non-White colonies. The term reflects the view that it is ultimately up to the West to save "lesser" nations. The source of these beliefs are embedded deeply in racism, regarding the White race as superior. This notion was prevalent during imperialism and colonialism. Critics argue that the shadows left behind imperialism and colonialism are still present in modern society; that western society has still failed to let go of the concept of "White Burden". As a result of this shadow, Westerns have projected "White Burden" onto Africa. Western society's promotion that is up to the responsibility of Westerners to save an entire nation reflects this. This notion is argued to be the new white man's burden.

=== Counter-argument ===
While critics of foreign humanitarianism in Africa argue it to be rooted in ethnocentrism, others argue that foreign aid is crucial for Africa to begin to sustain itself. That the act of financially aiding a country in need could not be detrimental. The work of foreign nations would allow the continent to eventually sustain itself and "feed itself"—addressing issues of extreme poverty in the nation. While this may be reflective of "The White Man's Burden", it is argued that Western nations are more developed scientifically and could then produce resources to assist the continent. Some argue that Africa's current state is due to the shadows of imperialism and colonialism, and thus it is up to foreign nations to assist the continent.

=== Paradoxes of humanitarianism in Africa ===
Humanitarian aid can therefore be considered a paradox in certain situations because instead of alleviating war, pain and suffering it can actually prolong them. Western society believes that the risk of a wounded soldier returning to conflict after being healed is better than leaving him or her to die where they are. This however, tends to prolong conflict. An extreme example of this can be seen through the Rwandan refugee camps that were formed along the border of Rwanda in 1994. The Rwandan army and the Interahamwe militias used the camps as a base to launch an attack and finish the genocide which had begun earlier that year in April. The militia was able to control the population through humanitarian aid and did not permit the return to Rwanda. Through these events they were also able to gain a considerably large amount of money through the humanitarian aid efforts. If and when it is found that aid is doing more harm than good, then that aid needs to be evaluated and stopped by the organization.

=== Terrorism and aid ===
Humanitarianism in Africa faces several challenges to date. Several western governments have introduced legislation that criminalizes terrorist organizations. While this is beneficial, it inadvertently ends up causing complications for humanitarian aid organizations because the anti-terrorist legislation does not make a difference between intentional and unintentional support to terrorist groups. Any commodities that end up in terrorist hands causes the people responsible for its distribution to be held criminally liable. This poses a large problem for humanitarian aid organizations that work in war-torn areas – specifically those areas which are oftentimes ruled by terrorist organizations as most organizations cannot say that 100% of their commodities get distributed to the original demographic it was meant for. The only exemption from criminal prosecution is medical assistance. Unfortunately some aid organizations do not bother to negotiate access to regions where terrorist groups have a strong presence. Consequently, those who need this aid are the ones forced to pay the consequences. War-torn regions such as Somalia, Pakistan and Afghanistan have had villages attacked in response to their receiving aid from organizations because it was aimed at attaining allegiance. Aid in this regard can also then be seen as a tool or weapon of war. A prime example of this can be demonstrated through the Rwandan genocide of 1994.

Since 9/11 many humanitarian organizations have directed their aid with western political agendas – this can be seen in Iraq and Afghanistan. This is not new however – aid was similarly distributed during the cold war. However, there are other organizations such as Al Qaida that in 2011 used aid to win the hearts and minds of the Somali population. It can be seen then that the best interests of the population receiving aid is not always the reason for distribution of aid from organizations but rather to influence the vulnerable. Aid should be given only on the basis of our shared humanity.

=== Effects of foreign systemic aid ===
Since 1960, rich countries have sent over US$2.6 trillion in aid to Africa. In the period between 1970 and 1998, when aid to Africa peaked, poverty rose from 11% to 66%. A significant cause of this rise in poverty has been the vast-sums of foreign based aid. Foreign systemic aid has harmed many African countries by decreasing their long-term economic growth, causing poverty to increase. Unconditionally and unenforced aid has caused systemic corruption and rent-seeking behavior, where powerful aid recipients direct foreign funds away from public investment and towards personal consumption. Simultaneously, more consumption decreases domestic savings, causing even less of the investment needed for long term growth. To combat the increase in poverty from stifled growth, foreign aid donors give even more aid, leading to a dangerous cycle which only furthers corruption and economic decline. Large inflows of aid also led to higher inflation, which domestic policy makers try to lower through increasing interest rates, a policy which causes even lower investment. Furthermore, aid strengthens African nation's domestic currency, which harms their international competitiveness to export goods (A phenomenon known as Dutch Disease). The result is a diminished manufacturing sector, a key area needed for developing economies to grow. Relatedly, aid has decreased the effectiveness of Africa's middle class and their ability to engage in civil society by removing the prime mechanism of accountability between citizens and government: the provision of public goods through taxes. Politicians need not invest in what is best for their constituents if their revenues are coming from foreign donors. This erodes the social capital needed for societies to function both economically and socially. Lastly, systemic aid increases the chances for violent intra-country conflict. Similar to the resource curse, aid acts as another resource to be fought over by competing groups, leading to increased social unrest and instability, potentially culminating in civil-war.

== Celebrity humanitarianism ==
The past decades have seen a rise in "celebrity humanitarianism", where many celebrities have engaged in advocacy and support for foreign humanitarian causes. Some of these most popular celebrities have included Bob Geldof, Bono, Angelina Jolie, and George Clooney. The debate surrounding celebrity humanitarianism is very controversial as many argue that they are instrumental to the development of Africa, while others argue that they are in fact detrimental to the development of Africa. Humanitarian actors such as Jolie, Clooney, Bono and Geldof come from western society and help to perpetuate the conceptualization and imagery of Africa as childlike in a western neo-colonial political framework. Africa has come to be a place that has a specific role in the neoliberal international system; it has become a place thanks to western stereotypes that needs to be saved from poverty, disease, and climate. Many argue that only westerners and celebrities are portrayed as saviors in the media while ignoring the very real local and regional progress as well as the movements and philanthropic work done by Africans themselves.

Geldof, Bono, and Jolie have all met with high-profile political and financial leaders in the world and are celebrated in the press as heroes who are fighting against the western elite by declaring the truths of Africa and its politics. Jolie's work mainly involves charities such as the Jolie-Pitt foundation and she is involved as a UN appointed Goodwill Ambassador for the UN High Commissioner for Refugees since 2001. Bono and Geldof are known for their contributions through mainly charity concerts and records. Subsequently, they have become household names and central spokesmen for the various campaigns for Africa such as the cancellation of Third World debt, which was followed by the organization of other Africa-related campaigns and events, such as DATA (Debt, AIDS, Trade, Africa), Product Red, Live 8 and Make Poverty History which George Clooney is also known for his involvement with.

Overall, the United Nations (UN), World Economic Forum (WEF), and many western non-governmental organizations (NGOs), who have used celebrities as spokespeople or participants in their activities, have viewed their involvement positively. The criticism mainly centers around the effectiveness of aid in the development process and real knowledge of the problems faced in Africa. Those who object to celebrity humanitarianism question not only question the knowledge of celebrities regarding African problems but also their ability to explain the issues since typically Africa is portrayed by them as a place that needs saving but the progress in Africa remains ignored. Celebrity humanitarianism is also critiqued because it removes agency from those who are being helped, as well as creating dangerous "savior" based narratives.

=== Feminism lens ===
Another critical objection comes from the feminist view where celebrity humanitarian actors show a gendered division when it comes to the support of humanitarian causes. Men such as George Clooney, Bono, and Bob Geldof promote humanitarian causes by meeting with governmental officials and representatives while women such as Mia Farrow, Audrey Hepburn, and Angelina Jolie are acknowledged and well known for their involvement with women and children in areas of crisis. It is argued that this depicts a view that "rational" men have a better grasp and understanding of politics while "emotional" women are better suited to caring and dealing with household or societal issues. In this regard, celebrity humanitarianism is viewed to be constituted and constructed of racial, class-specific, and gendered limits. However criticism arises as to their humanitarianism approaches because they are sometimes viewed as contradictory which results in differing images of Africa. From the feminist point of view, as artists their identities are said to lend an ambiguity to class, gender, and race. The men are feminized as artists however they convey a very white and hypersexual masculinity through their punk rock music which provides them the platform to act politically or as Time magazine once said, to "rock the establishment".

Bono and Geldof's representation of Africa was further strengthened as references were made to their working/lower-middle-class post-colonial Irish backgrounds. Jolie's colorful past shows traces of masculinity but that was overcome through specific acts of femininity. Jolie's disengagement from her hedonistic class privileges along with a public image makeover strengthened her position to be an advocate of humanitarian aid in Africa. Additional criticism arises as Bono gains even more credibility by discussing his Irish background and comparing the experiences of the Irish and Africans under colonialism. Bono and Geldof's humanitarianism was enabled due to their masculinized disadvantaged backgrounds and pasts while Jolie's humanitarianism was enabled because of her motherhood which was intertwined with her humanitarian work as she adopted children.

== Current humanitarianism ==
There are many organizations engaged in humanitarian efforts which impact Africa. They encompass a large range of NGOs, multinational institutions and state actors such as the World Health Organization, the World Bank, USAID, UNICEF and Doctors Without Borders just to name a few. These organizations have different and divergent focuses ranging from sustainable water to democracy promotion. Across 2024–2025, Philanthropist Saad Kassis-Mohamed was reported to have directed WeCare humanitarian programmes in Africa with at least US$350,000 raised for Sudan relief and reconstruction and additional in-kind support delivered through hundreds of mobility devices supplied to clinics and partners in Zimbabwe and Uganda, alongside projects described as spanning water, rehabilitation and basic-services support.
