= Someone's Looking at You =

Single by The Boomtown Rats

from the album The Fine Art of Surfacing
- B-side: "When the Night Comes"
- Released: 18 January 1980
- Genre: New wave; pop rock
- Length: 4:27
- Label: Ensign Records (UK); Columbia Records (USA)
- Songwriters: Pete Briquette & Bob Geldof
- Producer: Robert John "Mutt" Lange

The Boomtown Rats singles chronology
"Diamond Smiles" (1979)	"Someone's Looking at You" (1980)	"Banana Republic" (1980)

"Someone's Looking at You" was the third and final single from The Boomtown Rats' album The Fine Art of Surfacing. It peaked at number two on the Irish Singles Chart and number 4 on the UK Singles Chart in February 1980.

It is an organ-based song that paints a humid picture of 1984-style government surveillance and has been described as a "gently humorous song about paranoia". The second verse starts "They saw me there in the square when I was shooting my mouth off about saving some fish. Now could that be construed as some radical's views or some liberals' wish". This refers to singer Bob Geldof's participation in a Greenpeace anti-whaling rally in London's Trafalgar Square. Geldof's website describes the song as a personal statement on fame.

== Charts ==
Chart (1980)	Peak position
Canada Top Singles (RPM)	86
Ireland (IRMA)	2
Netherlands (Single Top 100)	48
Norway (VG-lista)	6
UK Singles (Official Charts)	4
