= Diamond Smiles =

Single by The Boomtown Rats

from the album The Fine Art of Surfacing
- B-side: "Late Last Night"
- Released: 9 November 1979
- Genre: New wave; pop rock
- Length: 3:54
- Label: Ensign Records (UK); Columbia Records (USA)
- Songwriter(s): Bob Geldof

The Boomtown Rats singles chronology
"I Don't Like Mondays" (1979)	"Diamond Smiles" (1979)	"Someone's Looking at You" (1980)

"Diamond Smiles" was the second single from The Boomtown Rats' album The Fine Art of Surfacing. It was the follow-up to their successful single "I Don't Like Mondays" and peaked at Number 13 in the UK Charts. The band has suggested that it might have fared better had it not been for a strike of lighting technicians on the powerful UK TV programme Top of The Pops at the time that the record was released and rising in the charts.

Dealing with death, as had "I Don't Like Mondays", the song tells the story of a glamorous debutante ('Diamond') who commits suicide and is remembered only for her low-cut dress. Some of the staff of Duke Street Hospital, in Glasgow, filed a petition with the IBA and the BBC demanding that the song be banned due to the lyrics exploiting a real-life suicide.

The song also featured as one of four songs on an Australian EP called Surface Down Under that also featured past hits "Rat Trap", "Looking After No.1" and "Like Clockwork".

The song was covered by Jay Bennett (of Wilco) on his posthumous album Kicking at the Perfumed Air, with the album's title also being derived from the song's lyrics.

== Reception ==
In a review of the album The Fine Art of Surfacing, critic Mike DeGagne said "'Diamond Smiles' jaunts along on a hiccup-like rhythm".

Smash Hits said, "It's puzzling that The Rats should have chosen this rather lifeless tale of high-society suicide as the follow up to "Mondays". It's tougher and more compact than their recent singles but I thought they'd have put aside the subject of violent death for a while."

Decades later, Penny Black Music commented on the band's connection to Ireland:"The song reflected the Dublin that had changed before the band’s very eyes. It was no longer the city of saints, but a reservoir of bankers, gangsters and sex."
