= How to Compose Popular Songs That Will Sell =

Studio album by Bob Geldof
- Released: 12 October 2010
- Genre: Pop, rock
- Length: 43:45
- Label: Mercury
- Producer: Pete Briquette

Bob Geldof chronology
Sex, Age & Death (2001)	How to Compose Popular Songs That Will Sell (2010)

Professional ratings
Review scores
Source	Rating
Allmusic	3.5/5 stars

How to Compose Popular Songs That Will Sell is the fifth solo studio album from Irish singer, Bob Geldof. It was released on 12 October 2010. How to Compose Popular Songs That Will Sell is Geldof's first album since 2001's Sex, Age & Death, and marks his return to the Mercury Records label. The album reached no. 89 on the UK Albums Chart in its week of entry on 13 February 2011.

== Track listing ==
All songs written by Bob Geldof, except as noted.

1. "How I Roll" (Geldof, Pete Briquette, Eliza Gilkyson) – 3:03
2. "Blowfish" (Geldof, Briquette) – 4:07
3. "She's a Lover" – 4:30
4. "To Live in Love" – 4:05
5. "Silly Pretty Thing" – 4:02
6. "Systematic 6-Pack" – 3:31
7. "Dazzled by You" – 2:41
8. "Mary Says" (Geldof, Briquette) – 4:52
9. "Blow" – 4:55
10. "Here's to You" – 7:59

== Singles ==
- "Silly Pretty Thing" (January 2011)
- "Here's To You" (April 2011)

== Personnel ==
The Band:

- Bob Geldof - lead vocals, backing vocals, electric & acoustic guitar, ukulele, harmonica, Jews harp
- Pete Briquette - bass, keyboards, electric guitar, programming, percussion
- Alan Dunn - piano, keyboards, accordion, backing vocals
- John Turnbull - electric & acoustic guitar, ukulele, backing vocals
- Vince Lovepump - violin, mandolin, Portuguese guitar, backing vocals
- Jim Russell - drums, percussion, backing vocals
- Niall Power - drums, percussion, backing vocals

Guest Musicians:

- Roger Taylor - backing vocals, percussion (on "Here's To You")
- Henry Dagg - musical saw
- Gary Roberts - electric guitar
- Tash Roper - clarinet, backing vocals
- Joshua J. Macrae - percussion
- Darrell Willis - hand claps, verbals

Production Credits:

- Pete Briquette - producer
- Joshua J. Macrae - engineer
- James Clarke - engineer (Faversham)

Recorded at The Priory Studios, Surrey; Briquette Studios, Acton, and Bob's house.
