= Cleveland Elementary School shooting (San Diego) =

1979 mass shooting in San Diego, California, U.S.

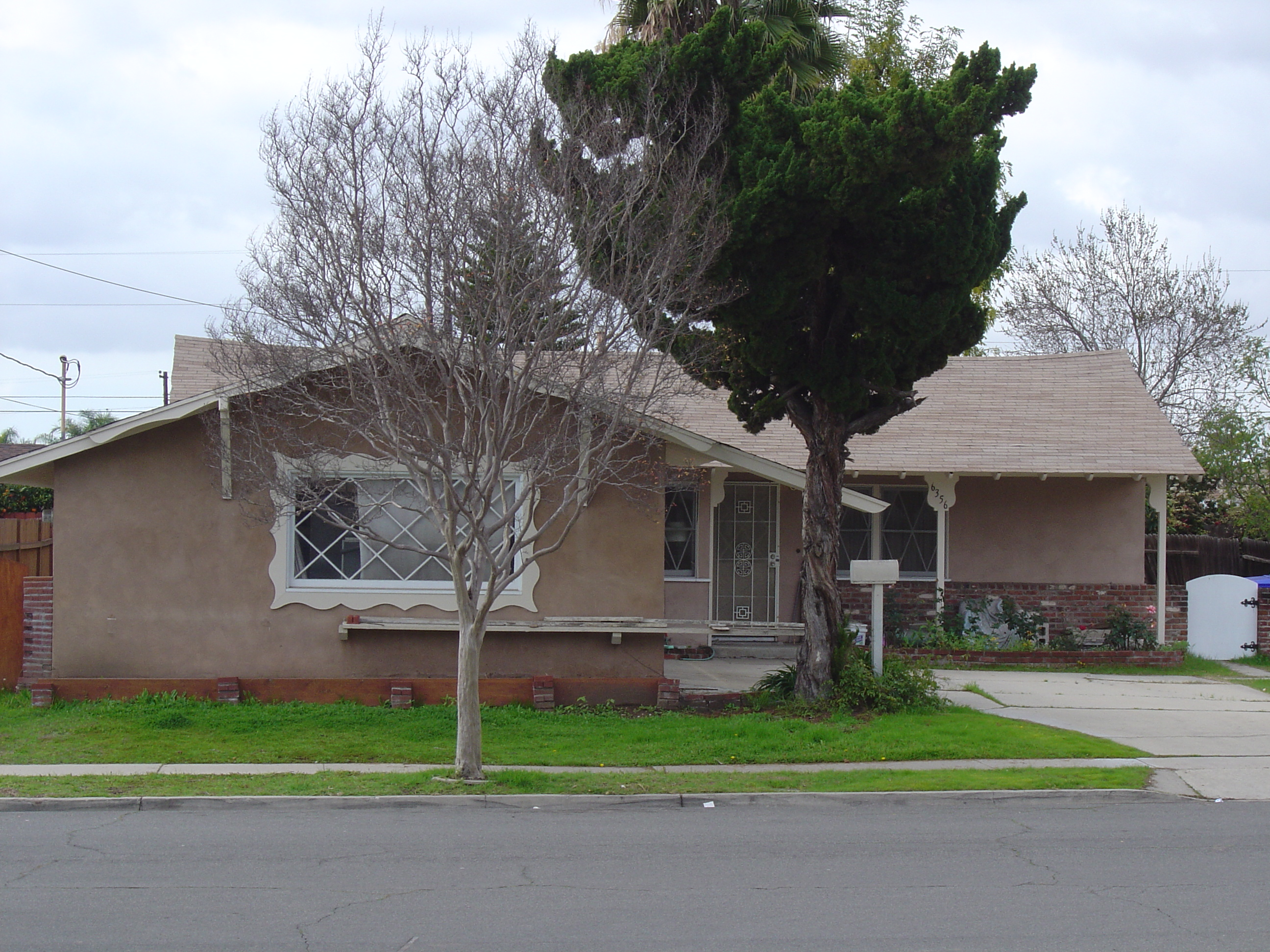
- Spencer's home, where she fired the shots
- Location: 32.7964°N 117.0123°W; San Diego, California, US
- Date: January 29, 1979
- Target: Students and faculty at Grover Cleveland Elementary School
- Attack type: Mass shooting; school shooting; double-murder
- Weapon: .22 LR Ruger 10/22 rifle
- Deaths: 2 (the principal & the custodian)
- Injuries: 9 (including the police officer)
- Perpetrator: Brenda Ann Spencer
- Verdict: Pleaded guilty
- Convictions: First-degree murder (2 counts), assault with a deadly weapon
- Sentence: Life imprisonment with the possibility of parole after 25 years

The Cleveland Elementary School shooting took place on January 29, 1979, at Grover Cleveland Elementary School in San Diego, California, United States. It is considered the first mass shooting at an elementary school in United States history.

The principal and a custodian were killed; eight children and a police officer were wounded. Brenda Spencer, a 16-year-old girl who lived in a house across the street from the school, was convicted of the shootings. Charged as an adult, she pleaded guilty to two counts of murder and assault with a deadly weapon and was sentenced to life in prison with a chance of parole after 25 years. As of 2026, she remains imprisoned after repeatedly having been denied parole.

== Shooting ==
On the morning of Monday, January 29, 1979, Spencer began shooting from her house at children across the street who were waiting for 53-year-old Principal Burton Wragg to open the gates to Grover Cleveland Elementary. She injured eight children. She first shot nine-year-old Cam Miller, who said he believed it was because he was wearing blue, which he had learned was her favorite color. Spencer shot and killed Wragg as he and teacher Daryl Barnes tried to help children. She fatally shot 56-year-old custodian Mike Suchar as he tried to pull a student to safety.

A 28-year-old police officer, Robert Robb, had responded to a call for assistance and she shot and wounded him in the neck as he arrived. Robb prevented further casualties by moving a garbage truck in front of the school entrance to obstruct her line of fire.

After firing thirty-six times, Spencer barricaded herself inside her home for several hours. She spoke by telephone to a reporter from The Evening Tribune, who had been calling random telephone numbers in the neighborhood. Spencer told the reporter she had shot at the school children and adults because, "I don't like Mondays. This livens up the day." She told police negotiators that the children and adults whom she had shot were easy targets and that she was going to "come out shooting". She surrendered and left the house after being promised a Burger King meal by negotiators.

== Perpetrator ==
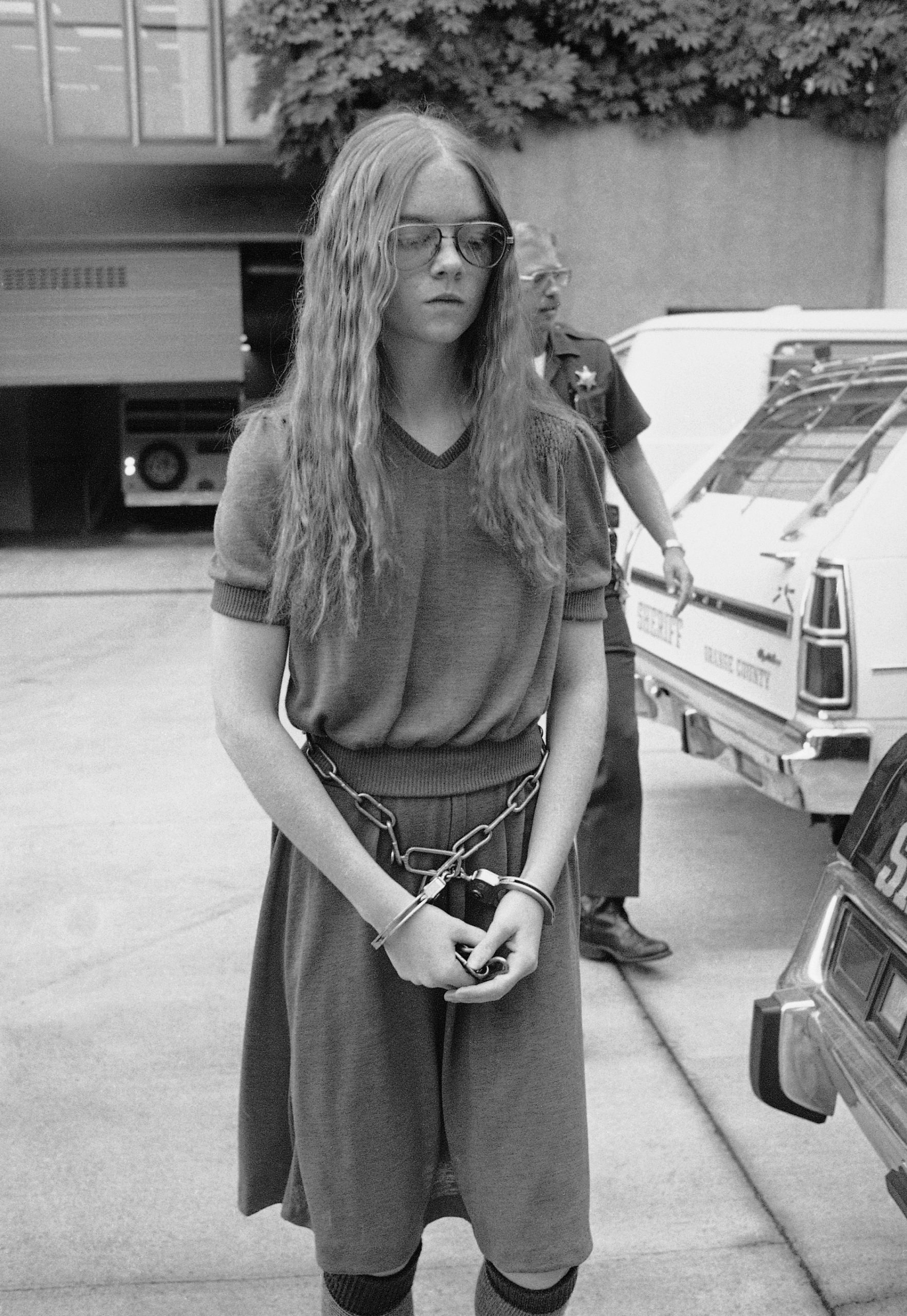
Spencer in handcuffs following the shooting.

Brenda Ann Spencer (born April 3, 1962) was born to Dorothy Nadine (née Hobel) and Wallace Edward Spencer. They married on December 12, 1954, in Chula Vista and had three children. Brenda was the youngest. In January 1972, after Dorothy found out her husband had been cheating on her with multiple women, she filed for divorce.

After her parents separated, Brenda allegedly lived in poverty with her father. Both father and daughter slept on a single mattress on the living room floor, in a house strewn with empty bottles of alcohol. At later parole hearings, she claimed to have been subject to "total neglect" from her mother and sexual abuse from her father. The accusations have been disputed by the respective parents. At the time, she lived in a house across the street from the school. Aged 16 at the time of the shooting, she was 5'2" (157 cm) and very thin, and had bright red hair.

Acquaintances said Spencer expressed hostility toward police officers, had spoken about shooting one, and had talked of doing something big to get on television. Although Spencer showed ability as a photographer, winning first place in a Humane Society competition, she was generally uninterested in school. She attended Patrick Henry High School, where one teacher recalled frequently inquiring if she was awake in class. Later, during tests while she was in custody, it was discovered that Spencer had an injury to one of the temporal lobes of her brain. It was attributed to an accident on her bicycle.

Spencer described herself as a "radical" and referred to police officers as "pigs," exclaiming "All right!" when seeing news on TV about police officers being killed. She often talked about wanting to kill police officers or "blow them away." Some classmates described her as "crazy" and reported being scared of her.

In early 1978, staff at a facility for problem students, into which Spencer had been referred for truancy, informed her parents that she was suicidal. That summer, Spencer, who was known to hunt birds in the neighborhood, was arrested for shooting out the windows of Grover Cleveland Elementary with a BB gun and for burglary. Police reports and eyewitnesses did not mention the use of a BB gun during the school vandalism.

In December 1978, while she was still on probation for breaking into the school, a psychiatric evaluation arranged by her probation officer recommended that Spencer be admitted to a mental hospital for depression. Her father refused to give permission. For Christmas 1978, he gave her a Ruger 10/22 semi-automatic .22 caliber rifle with a telescopic sight and 500 rounds of ammunition.

Spencer later said, "I asked for a radio and got a rifle." Asked why he had done that, she answered, "He bought the rifle so I would kill myself."

=== Analysis ===
Several 21st century accounts identify the Cleveland Elementary School shooting in San Diego as the earliest recorded elementary school shooting in the United States. The perpetrator, Brenda Spencer, has been described as the first modern high-profile school shooter. According to a 2013 article in the New York Daily News, her actions marked a significant turning point in American history. Given later history of violent acts, Spencer has been referred to as "the mother" of subsequent school shootings, including those at Columbine, Colorado, and Newtown, Connecticut, both committed by teenage males. The number of school shootings has increased markedly since 1979.

San Diego County Deputy District Attorney Richard Sachs noted that Spencer "hurt so many people and had so much to do with starting a deadly trend in America." In a 2001 statement, Spencer acknowledged the potential influence of her actions on later incidents, remarking, "With every school shooting, I feel I'm partially responsible. What if they got the idea from what I did?"

== Imprisonment ==
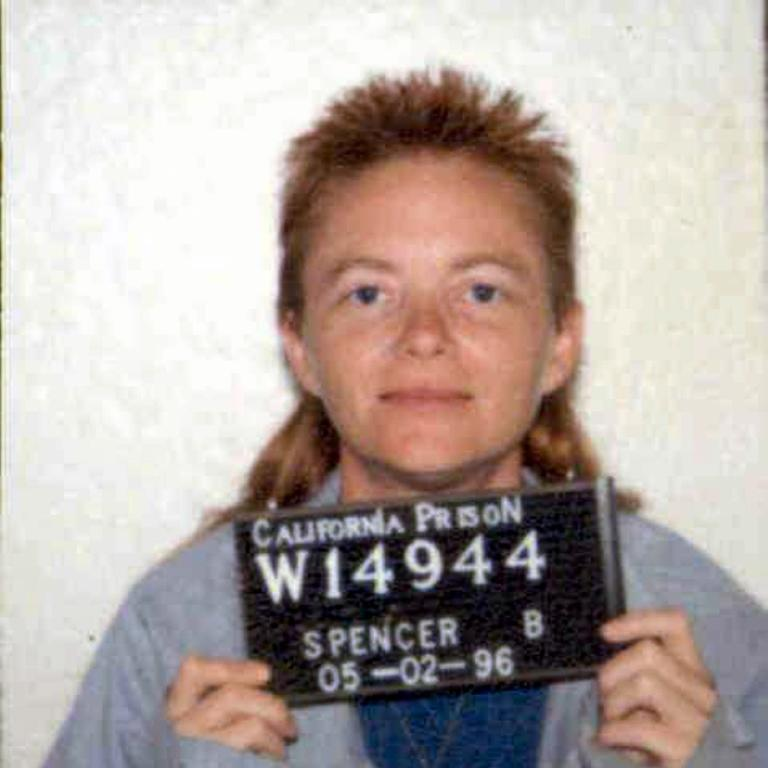
1996 mugshot of Spencer.

Spencer was charged as an adult. She pleaded guilty to two counts of murder and assault with a deadly weapon. On April 4, 1980, a day after her 18th birthday, she was sentenced to concurrent terms of 25 years to life in prison. Nine counts of attempted murder were dismissed. In prison, Spencer was diagnosed with epilepsy and received medication to treat epilepsy and depression. While at California Institution for Women in Chino, she worked repairing electronic equipment.

Under the terms of her sentencing, Spencer became eligible in 1993 for hearings to consider her suitability for parole.

At her first hearing, in 1993, Spencer said she had hoped that police would shoot her, and that she had been a user of alcohol and drugs at the time of the crime. However, results of drug tests done when she was taken into custody were negative. At her 2001 parole hearing, Spencer claimed that her father had been subjecting her to beatings and sexual abuse, but he said the allegations were not true. The parole board chairman said that, because she had not previously told anyone about the allegations, he doubted their veracity.

In 2005, a San Diego deputy district attorney cited an incident of self-harm from four years earlier, when Spencer's girlfriend was released from jail, as showing that Spencer was psychotic and unfit to be released. Early reports indicated that Spencer had scratched the words "courage" and "pride" into her own skin. Spencer corrected this during her parole hearing; she said the words were "unforgiven" and "alone."

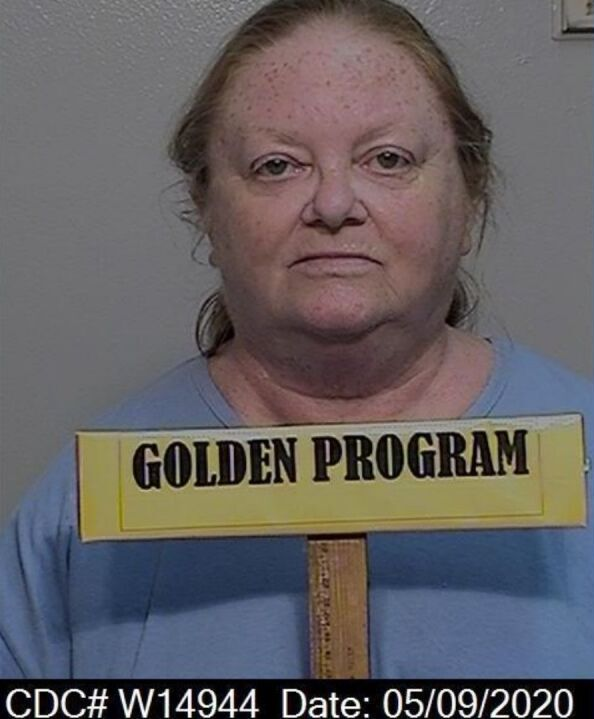
2020 mugshot of Spencer.

In 2009, the board again refused her application for parole, and ruled it would be ten years before she would be considered again. In August 2022, Spencer and the Board of Parole Hearings agreed that she was not suitable for parole and that she would not be eligible for another hearing for a further three years. In February 2025, she was again denied parole. She remains imprisoned at California Institution for Women in Chino. Her next opportunity for a parole hearing will be in 2028.

== Aftermath ==
A plaque and flagpole were erected at Cleveland Elementary in memory of the shooting victims. Due to declining enrollment, the school was closed in 1983, along with a dozen other public schools around the city. In the ensuing decades, it was leased to several charter and private schools. From 2005 to 2017, it housed the Magnolia Science Academy, a public charter middle school serving students in grades 6–8.

The school board decided to sell the school because of budget issues. In 2018, the building was demolished by the new owner and the site was redeveloped for housing. The memorial plaque was relocated to the southern edge of the former school site, at the corner of Lake Atlin Avenue and Lake Angela Drive.

== Stepmother ==
In the months following the shooting, one of Brenda Spencer's first cellmates at the juvenile facility was released. The 17-year-old girl moved in with Spencer's father, whom she'd met through his visits to Brenda. They later married on March 26, 1980, in Yuma, Arizona. They had a daughter together, after which she fled the household and eventually divorced her estranged husband. She left Wallace Spencer to raise the girl alone. Wallace Spencer died in February 2016.

== Survivors ==
On January 17, 1989, almost ten years after the shooting, there was a shooting at a school in Stockton, California. Coincidentally it was also named Grover Cleveland Elementary. Five students were killed and thirty injured. Christy Buell, a survivor of the 1979 shooting, was "shocked, saddened, horrified" by the headlines concerning the incident.

== Media ==
=== Song ===
Bob Geldof, the lead singer of the Boomtown Rats, read about the incident when a news story about it came off the telex at WRAS-FM, the campus radio station at Georgia State University in Atlanta. He was particularly struck by Spencer's claim that she did it because she did not like Mondays, and began writing a song about it, called "I Don't Like Mondays". It was released in July 1979, was number one for four weeks in the United Kingdom, and was the band's biggest hit in their native Ireland.

Although it did not make the Top 40 in the U.S., it still received extensive radio airplay (outside of the San Diego area) despite the Spencer family's efforts to prevent it. Geldof later claimed that "[Spencer] wrote to me saying 'she was glad she'd done it because I'd made her famous,' which is not a good thing to live with", though Spencer denies ever contacting Geldof.

=== Films and television ===
The 1981 Japanese–American documentary film The Killing of America includes the incident. The 2006 British documentary I Don't Like Mondays is about the case.

The Investigation Discovery network portrayed Spencer's crimes in one of the three cases presented in the premiere episode of season 2 on the crime documentary series Deadly Women, titled "Thrill Killers", which aired in October 2008.

The Lifetime Movies series Killer Kids released an episode "Deadly Compulsion" depicting Spencer's crimes, which first aired in September 2014.

== See also ==
- 1998 Thurston High School shooting, perpetrated by a mentally ill 15-year-old, who also remains imprisoned, with guns his father had given him.
- List of homicides in California
- List of school shootings in the United States
- List of school shootings in the United States by death toll
