= Sex, Age & Death =

Studio album by Bob Geldof
- Released: 1 October 2001
- Studio: Cosford Mill
- Genre: Pop, rock
- Length: 45:08
- Label: Eagle Records; Koch Records (US)
- Producer: Pete Briquette

Bob Geldof chronology
The Happy Club (1992)	Sex, Age & Death (2001)	How to Compose Popular Songs That Will Sell (2010)

Professional ratings
Review scores
Source	Rating
Allmusic	4/5 stars

Sex, Age & Death is the fourth solo studio album by Bob Geldof.

== Track listing ==
All songs were written by Bob Geldof, except where noted.

1. "One for Me" – 4:59
2. "$6,000,000 Loser" (Geldof, Pete Briquette) – 4:23
3. "Pale White Girls" – 4:58
4. "The New Routine" (Geldof, Briquette) – 5:25
5. "Mudslide" – 4:50
6. "Mind in Pocket" (Geldof, Briquette) – 4:37
7. "My Birthday Suit" – 2:58
8. "Scream in Vain" – 4:59
9. "Inside Your Head" (Geldof, John Turnbull) – 4:38
10. "10:15" – 3:21

Great Songs of Indifference re-release

11. "A Summer Day [London '95]" – 2:49
12. "Sighs and Whispers" – 3:10
13. "Voodoo Child" – 3:57
14. "Two Dogs" – 3:22
15. "Harvest Moon" – 3:29
16. "A Summer Night [London '95]" – 3:12
17. "Pale White Girls [French Mix]" – 3:47
18. "Cool Blue Easy" – 4:56
19. "Pity the Poor Drifter" – 2:14

== Personnel ==
- Bob Geldof – vocals, guitar, harmonica
- Pete Briquette – bass guitar, guitar, keyboards, programming
- Alan Dunn – keyboards, accordion, backing vocals
- John Turnbull – guitars, backing vocals
- Niall Power – drums, backing vocals
- Bob Loveday – violin, bass guitar
- Roger Taylor – drums and backing vocals on "Mind in Pocket", "Mudslide" and "Scream in Vain"; backing vocals on "One for Me"
- Joshua Macrae – engineer, drums, percussion
- Keith Prior – drums
- Dean S. Crathern – assistant engineer

== Singles ==
- "Pale White Girls" (new mood mix) / "Pale White Girls" (new moodier mix) / "Pale White Girls" (Original album version) (14 January 2002)
