= I Don't Like Mondays =

1979 single by the Boomtown Rats

Single by the Boomtown Rats

from the album The Fine Art of Surfacing
- B-side: "It's All the Rage"
- Released: 13 July 1979 (UK)
- Studio: Trident Studios
- Genre: New wave; pop
- Length: 4:19 (LP); 3:47 (single/video)
- Label: Ensign (UK); Columbia (US)
- Songwriters: Bob Geldof; Johnnie Fingers
- Producer: Phil Wainman

The Boomtown Rats singles chronology
"Rat Trap" (1978)	"I Don't Like Mondays" (1979)	"Diamond Smiles" (1979)

Music video
- "I Don't Like Mondays" on YouTube

Audio
- "I Don't Like Mondays" on YouTube

"I Don't Like Mondays" is a song by the Irish new wave band the Boomtown Rats about the Cleveland Elementary School shooting in San Diego. It was released in 1979 as the lead single from their third studio album, The Fine Art of Surfacing. The song was a number-one single in the UK singles chart for four weeks during the summer of 1979, and ranks as the sixth-biggest hit of the UK in 1979. Written by Bob Geldof and Johnnie Fingers, the piano ballad was the band's second single to reach number one on the UK chart.

== Background and writing ==
According to Geldof, he wrote the song after reading a telex report at Georgia State University's campus radio station, WRAS, on the shooting spree of 16-year-old Brenda Ann Spencer, who fired from her bedroom window at children in a school playground at Grover Cleveland Elementary School in San Diego, California, on 29 January 1979, killing two adults and injuring eight children and one police officer. Spencer showed no remorse for her crime; her explanation for her actions was "I don't like Mondays. This livens up the day". Her flippant response attracted media attention and inspired the song. Geldof had been contacted by Steve Jobs to play a gig for Apple, inspiring the opening line about a "silicon chip". The song was first performed less than a month later.

Geldof explained how he wrote the song:

I was doing a radio interview in Atlanta with Johnnie Fingers and there was a telex machine beside me. I read it as it came out. Not liking Mondays as a reason for doing somebody in is a bit strange. I was thinking about it on the way back to the hotel and I just said 'silicon chip inside her head had switched to overload'. I wrote that down. And the journalists interviewing her said, 'Tell me why?' It was such a senseless act. It was the perfect senseless act and this was the perfect senseless reason for doing it. So perhaps I wrote the perfect senseless song to illustrate it. It wasn't an attempt to exploit tragedy.

Geldof had originally intended the song as a B-side, but changed his mind after the song was successful with audiences on the Rats' US tour. Spencer's family tried to prevent the single from being released in the United States, but were unsuccessful. Some radio stations in San Diego, where the shooting occurred, refused to play the song, while others said they would not censor it.

In later years, Geldof stated that he regretted writing the song because he "made Brenda Spencer famous".

In 2019, Geldof and Fingers reached an agreement in their dispute over who wrote the song, until then credited solely to Geldof. Fingers received a financial settlement and co-credit.

== Chart performance ==
Released on 13 July 1979, the song reached number one in the United Kingdom, Ireland, Australia and South Africa, and the top 10 in several other countries. It was less successful in the US, reaching only number 73 on the Billboard Hot 100.

In 1994, the song was re-released to promote the greatest hits album Loudmouth. It then peaked at number 38 on the UK singles chart.

In the UK, the song won the Best Pop Song and Outstanding British Lyric categories at the Ivor Novello Awards.

=== Weekly charts ===
Chart (1979–80)	Peak position
Australia (Kent Music Report)	1
Austria (Ö3 Austria Top 40)	10
Belgium (Ultratop 50 Flanders)	3
Canada Top Singles (RPM)	4
Ireland (IRMA)	1
Netherlands (Dutch Top 40)	2
Netherlands (Single Top 100)	2
New Zealand (Recorded Music NZ)	3
Norway (VG-lista)	3
South Africa (Springbok Radio)	1
Spain (AFYVE)	7
Sweden (Sverigetopplistan)	2
Switzerland (Schweizer Hitparade)	6
UK Singles (Official Charts)	1
US Billboard Hot 100	73
US Cash Box Top 100	84
West Germany (GfK)	6

=== Year-end charts ===
Chart (1979)	Position
Australia (Kent Music Report)	6
Belgium (Ultratop Flanders)	31
Canada Top Singles (RPM)	117
Netherlands (Dutch Top 40)	26
Netherlands (Single Top 100)	38
New Zealand (Recorded Music NZ)	25
South Africa (Springbok Radio)	11
UK Singles (OCC)	4
West Germany (Official German Charts)	48

Chart (1980)	Position
Canada Top Singles (RPM)	55

== Certifications ==
Region	Certification	Certified units/sales
Canada (Music Canada)	Gold	75,000^{^}
United Kingdom (BPI)	Gold	500,000^{^}
^{^} Shipments figures based on certification alone.

== Live performances ==
The first public performance of the song was reportedly as an encore at the end of the Boomtown Rats' first U.S. concert, at the Roxy Theater in the Pacific Beach neighborhood of San Diego, the city where the shooting occurred, on 27 February 1979. However, a later planned Boomtown Rats concert at San Diego's Fox Theatre in April 1980 was canceled, with Geldof and promoter Larry Vallon saying that they had canceled the show out of respect for a group of local parents who had planned to picket the theater, although a reporter for the San Diego Union could not find any evidence of a planned protest and suggested it may have been canceled merely due to poor ticket sales.

On 9 September 1981, Geldof was joined on stage by fellow Boomtown Rat Johnnie Fingers to perform the song for The Secret Policeman's Ball sponsored by Amnesty International. A recording of that performance appears on the 1982 album The Secret Policeman's Other Ball.

The Boomtown Rats performed the song for Live Aid at Wembley Stadium in 1985. This was the band's final major appearance. On singing the line, "And the lesson today is how to die", Geldof paused for 20 seconds while the crowd applauded the significance to those starving in Africa that Live Aid was intended to help.

At a concert in London in 1995, almost ten years later to the day, Bon Jovi covered the song after being joined on stage by Geldof at Wembley Stadium. This recorded performance features on Bon Jovi's live album One Wild Night Live 1985–2001, as well as on the bonus 2-CD edition of These Days. Bon Jovi was again joined by Geldof for a performance of the song at The O2 Arena on 23 June 2010, the 10th night of their 12-night residency.

Bob Geldof performed the song solo at Live 8 in 2005. Using much of the musical equipment used by rock band Travis, who had just left the stage, Geldof decided on the "spur of the moment" to perform the song. His performance included the mid-song "how to die" pause famously added during Live Aid.

== Music video ==
A music video directed by David Mallet was used to promote the song.

== See also ==
- List of one-hit wonders in the United States § 1970s
