= The Vegetarians of Love =

Studio album by Bob Geldof
- Released: 23 July 1990
- Studio: Maison Rouge, Fulham Broadway, London; Studio Acousti, Paris
- Genre: Folk rock, pop, rock, Celtic
- Length: 57:29
- Label: Mercury (UK); Atlantic (US)
- Producer: Rupert Hine

Bob Geldof chronology
Deep in the Heart of Nowhere (1986)	The Vegetarians of Love (1990)	The Happy Club (1993)

Professional ratings
Review scores
Source	Rating
Allmusic	4.5/5 stars
Select	2/5

The Vegetarians of Love is the second solo studio album by Bob Geldof, released in July 1990. 'The Vegetarians of Love' was also the name of the band of musicians with whom Geldof recorded the album. It includes Pete Briquette from Geldof's previous band, The Boomtown Rats, who also co-wrote one track. Another notable co-writer was David A. Stewart of Eurythmics. The album was produced by Rupert Hine, who also played on it.

The album reached No. 21 in the UK Albums Chart in August 1990.

Three singles were released from the album, of which only one, "The Great Song of Indifference", entered the UK Singles Chart, peaking at no. 15.

== Track listing ==
All songs were written by Bob Geldof, except where noted.

1. "A Gospel Song" – 5:24
2. "Love or Something" (Geldof, David A. Stewart) – 4:39
3. "The Great Song of Indifference" – 4:38
4. "Thinking Voyager 2 Type Things" (Geldof, Pete Briquette) – 8:20
5. "Big Romantic Stuff" – 4:06
6. "Crucified Me" – 2:09
7. "The Chains of Pain" (Geldof, Daniel Mitchell) – 3:43
8. "A Rose at Night" – 5:42
9. "No Small Wonder" (Geldof, Mitchell) – 4:46
10. "Walking Back to Happiness" – 7:29
11. "Let It Go" – 4:40
12. "The End of the World" – 1:52

Great Songs of Indifference re-release

13. "Out of Order" – 3:29
14. "Hotel 75" – 3:56
15. "One of the Girls" – 2:28
16. "The Original Miss Jesus" – 3:44
17. "The Vegetarians of Love" – 1:19
18. "Sunny Afternoon" – 3:44
19. "The Great Song of Indifference" (French Version) – 3:37

== Personnel ==
The Vegetarians of Love:

- Bob Geldof – acoustic and electric guitar, lead vocals, backing vocals
- Pete Briquette – bass guitar, keyboard
- Phil Palmer – acoustic and electric guitars
- Geoff Richardson – viola, electric and acoustic guitar, clarinet, saxophone, recorders, penny whistles, ukulele, assorted kitchen utensils
- Steve Fletcher – piano, organ
- Alan Dunn – accordion, organ
- Rupert Hine – piano, keyboards, percussion, backing vocals
- Bob Loveday – violin, penny whistle, bass guitar

Occasional Vegetarians:

- Gerry Moffett – electric guitar
- Paul Carrack – organ
- Geoff Dugmore – drums, percussion
- Kevin Godley – backing vocals
- Cameron Jenkins – saxophone on "Love or Something"
- Gordon Bonnar – guitar on "The Chains of Pain"
- David A. Stewart – guitar on "Love or Something"

Production Credits:

Recorded at Maison Rouge Studios, London, by Stephen W Tayler and Andrew Scarth, assisted by Emmanuel Taylor

Mixed at Maison Rouge Studios, London, by Stephen W Tayler and Cameron Jenkins.

Mastered by Arun Chakraverty at The Master Room.

Demos produced by Pete Briquette.

== Singles ==
- "The Great Song of Indifference" / "Hotel 75" / "In The Pouring Rain" (11 June 1990, UK No. 15)
- "Love or Something" / "Out Of Order" / "Friends For Life" / "One Of The Girls" (30 July 1990)
- "A Gospel Song" / "Vegetarians Of Love" / "The Warmest Fire" (29 October 1990)
