= The Happy Club =

Studio album by Bob Geldof
- Released: 5 October 1992
- Studio: The Point Studios, Belgravia, London; Joe's Garage, Clapham, London; Studio Acousti, Paris; Seaview Studios, London
- Genre: Pop, rock
- Length: 63:20
- Label: Mercury (UK); Atlantic (US)
- Producer: Rupert Hine, Bob Geldof, Pete Briquette

Bob Geldof chronology
The Vegetarians of Love (1990)	The Happy Club (1992)	Sex, Age & Death (2002)

Professional ratings
Review scores
Source	Rating
Allmusic	link

The Happy Club is the third solo studio album by Bob Geldof.

== Track listing ==
=== UK / international version ===
All songs were written by Bob Geldof, except where noted.

1. "Room 19" – 5:14
2. "Attitude Chicken" – 4:36
3. "The Soft Soil" – 7:29
4. "A Hole to Fill" – 5:05
5. "The Song of the Emergent Nationalist" (Geldof, Jamie Moses) – 6:55
6. "My Hippy Angel" – 5:31
7. "The Happy Club" (Geldof, Karl Wallinger) – 4:05
8. "Like Down on Me" – 5:58
9. "Too Late God" (Geldof, Karl Hyde) – 3:46
10. "Roads of Germany (After B.D.)" – 5:14
11. "A Sex Thing" – 5:09
12. "The House at the Top of the World" (Geldof, Rick Smith) – 4:13

Great Songs of Indifference re-release

13. "Shine On" – 4:10
14. "Huge Birdless Silence" – 3:24
15. "Maybe Heaven" – 5:52

=== US version ===
All songs were written by Bob Geldof, except where noted.

1. "Room 19"
2. "A Hole to Fill"
3. "The Song of the Emergent Nationalist" (Geldof, Jamie Moses)
4. "Attitude Chicken"
5. "Yeah, Definitely"
6. "The House at the Top of the World" (Geldof, Rick Smith)
7. "The Soft Soil"
8. "A Sex Thing"
9. "My Hippy Angel"
10. "The Happy Club" (Geldof, Karl Wallinger)
11. "Like Down on Me"
12. "Too Late God" (Geldof, Karl Hyde)
13. "Roads of Germany (After B.D.)"

== Personnel ==
=== The Happy Clubsters ===
- Bob Geldof – lead vocals, acoustic and electric guitars, harmonica
- Pete Briquette – bass guitar, keyboards, programming
- Bob Loveday – violin, penny whistle, bass guitar, recorder
- Geoff Richardson – viola, mandolin, electric and acoustic guitar, saxophone, ukulele, penny whistle
- Jamie Moses – electric and acoustic guitars
- Niall Power – drums
- Alan Dunn – accordion, piano, tin whistle, organ, one-row melodeon, keyboards
- Spike Edney – organ, piano, guitar, keyboards

=== Trainee Clubster ===
- Karl Wallinger - guitar, drums, vocals, keyboards

=== Production ===
- Johnny Milton – engineer
- Stephen W. Taylor – engineer
