= Deep in the Heart of Nowhere =

Studio album by Bob Geldof
- Released: 24 November 1986
- Genre: Pop, rock
- Length: 61:35
- Label: Mercury (UK); Atlantic (US)
- Producer: Rupert Hine; Jimmy Iovine on "This Is the World Calling" and "In the Pouring Rain"

Bob Geldof chronology
| Deep in the Heart of Nowhere (1986) | The Vegetarians of Love (1990) |

Professional ratings
Review scores
| Source | Rating |
|---|---|
| Allmusic | 3/5 stars |

Deep in the Heart of Nowhere is the first solo studio album by Bob Geldof, the ex-Boomtown Rats lead singer. It was released in November 1986. The collection reached No. 79 for one week in the UK Albums Chart in December 1986.

The main single was "This Is the World Calling", which briefly had sneak preview (power) rotation on MTV. "Love Like a Rocket" was also released as a single. It was remastered and re-released in 2005 with his (at the time) three other solo albums as part of The Great Songs of Indifference: The Anthology 1986-2001 collection, and included four bonus tracks.

== Track listing ==
All songs were written by Bob Geldof, except where noted.

1. "This Is the World Calling" (Geldof, Raymond Doom) – 4:29
2. "In the Pouring Rain" – 4:30
3. "August Was a Heavy Month" – 5:07
4. "Love Like a Rocket" (Geldof, Doom) – 5:23
5. "I Cry Too" – 4:25
6. "When I Was Young" – 5:51
7. "This Heartless Heart" – 4:13
8. "The Beat of the Night" – 5:33
9. "Truly, True Blue" – 1:19
10. "Pulled Apart by Horses" – 4:29
11. "Words from Heaven" – 4:40
12. "Good Boys in the Wrong" – 5:18
13. "Night Turns to Day" – 4:53
14. "Deep in the Heart of Nowhere" – 1:19

Great Songs of Indifference re-release

15. "Life Is the Hardest Thing" – 3:13
16. "Friends for Life" – 5:29
17. "August Was a Heavy Month" (Instrumental) – 4:01
18. "Dig a Ditch" – 4:28

== Personnel ==
- David A. Stewart - guitars, keyboards
- Eric Clapton - guitar on "Love Like a Rocket", "Beat of the Night" and "August Was a Heavy Month"
- Brian Setzer - guitar
- Jamie West-Oram - guitar
- Alison Moyet - vocals on "This Is the World Calling"
- Midge Ure
- Omar Hakim
- Suzie O'List
- Clem Burke
- Pat Seymour
- Maria McKee - vocals on "This Is the World Calling"
- Annie Lennox - vocals on "This Is the World Calling"
- Gill O'Donovan
- Mint Julep
- Jools Holland
- Sonny Southon
- Maria Albert
- Lianne Davis
- T. M. Stevens
- Bono

Technical

- The Brothers of Doom – producer on "This Is the World Calling" and "In the Pouring Rain"
- Jimmy Iovine – producer on "This Is the World Calling" and "In the Pouring Rain"
- Rupert Hine - producer on all tracks except "This Is the World Calling" and "In the Pouring Rain"
- Stephen W Tayler - recorder and mixer
- Andrew Scarth, Jon Bavin, Joe Chiccarelli - engineers
- Brian Aris - cover photography

== Singles ==
- "This Is the World Calling" / "Talk Me Up" (20 October 1986)
- "Love Like a Rocket" (Remix) / "Pulled Apart By Horses" (26 January 1987) (UK & European release)
- "Heartless Heart" / "Pulled Apart By Horses" (1987) (US release)
- "I Cry Too" / "Let's Go" (8 June 1987) (UK release)
- "In the Pouring Rain" / "Let's Go" (1987) (Non-UK European release)
