= Bob Geldof =

Irish singer-songwriter and political activist (born 1951)

Bob Geldof KBE
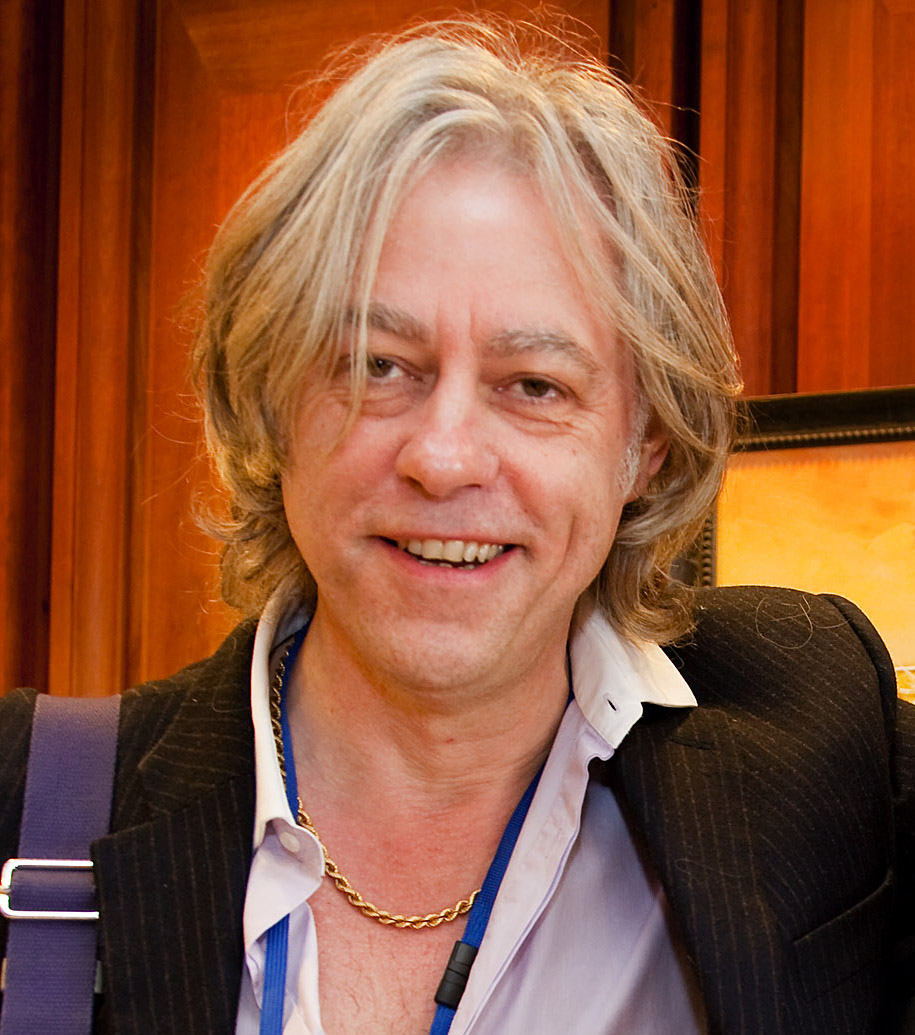
- Geldof in 2009
- Born: Robert Frederick Zenon Geldof; 5 October 1951 (age 75); Dún Laoghaire, County Dublin, Ireland
- Occupations: Singer-songwriter; political activist
- Years active: 1975–present
- Spouses: Paula Yates (m. 1986; div. 1996); Jeanne Marine (m. 2015)
- Children: 4, including Peaches, Pixie and Tiger Lily (adopted)
- Musical career
- Genres: Rock; pop
- Instruments: Vocals; guitar; harmonica
- Labels: Polydor; Atlantic (US)
- Member of: The Boomtown Rats
- Formerly of: Band Aid

Robert Frederick Zenon Geldof (/ˈɡɛldɒf/; born 5 October 1951) is an Irish singer-songwriter, political activist, television producer and entrepreneur. He rose to prominence in the late 1970s as the lead singer of the Irish rock band the Boomtown Rats, who achieved popularity as part of the punk rock movement. The band had UK number one hits with his co-compositions "Rat Trap" and "I Don't Like Mondays". Geldof starred as Pink in Pink Floyd's film Pink Floyd – The Wall (1982).

Geldof is widely recognised for his activism, especially his anti-poverty efforts concerning Africa. In 1984, Geldof and Midge Ure organised the charity supergroup Band Aid for famine relief in Ethiopia, and co-wrote the best-selling single "Do They Know It's Christmas?". They organised the charity super-concert Live Aid the following year and the Live 8 concerts in 2005. Geldof serves as an adviser to the ONE Campaign, co-founded by fellow Irish rock singer and activist Bono, and is a member of the Africa Progress Panel (APP), a group of ten distinguished individuals who advocate at the highest levels for equitable and sustainable development in Africa.

Geldof was granted an honorary knighthood (KBE) by Queen Elizabeth II in 1986 for his charity work in Africa. It was an honorary award as Geldof is an Irish citizen, but he is often referred to as 'Sir Bob'. Among numerous other awards and nominations he was a recipient of the Man of Peace title, which recognised individuals who had made "an outstanding contribution to international social justice and peace". In 2005, he received the Brit Award for Outstanding Contribution to Music.

== Early life ==
Geldof was born and brought up in Dún Laoghaire in County Dublin in Ireland, a son of Robert Geldof (1914–2010) and Evelyn (née Weller). His paternal grandfather, Zenon Geldof, was a Belgian immigrant and a hotel chef. His paternal grandmother, Amelia Falk, was a British Jew from London of German-Jewish descent. His maternal grandfather Frederick Weller was a dentist. His mother, Evelyn, was head cashier at a cinema in Cork City, where she met her husband, Robert. Bob Geldof has relatives in County Cork. His maternal aunt Catherine Weller was married to Tommy Nott, who worked as night foreman at the Cork Examiner newspaper, but whose relationship to Geldof has been twice misreported in that newspaper.

Regarding his Jewish ancestry, in a 2011 interview with the Manchester-based Jewish Telegraph, Geldof said "I was a quarter Catholic, a quarter Protestant, a quarter Jewish and a quarter nothing—the nothing won."

On 5 June 1960, when Geldof was eight years old, his mother Evelyn died at age 45 of a cerebral haemorrhage. He had two sisters, Cleo and Lynn. Cleo died in 2010 and Lynn is a writer, journalist and Unicef campaigner.

Geldof attended Blackrock College, Dublin where he was bullied for being a poor rugby player and for his middle name, Zenon. After working as a slaughterman, a road navvy and pea canner in Wisbech, England, he was hired as a music journalist in Vancouver, British Columbia, Canada, for The Georgia Straight. He briefly guest hosted the Canadian Broadcasting Corporation children's program Switchback.

== Musical career ==
=== The Boomtown Rats ===
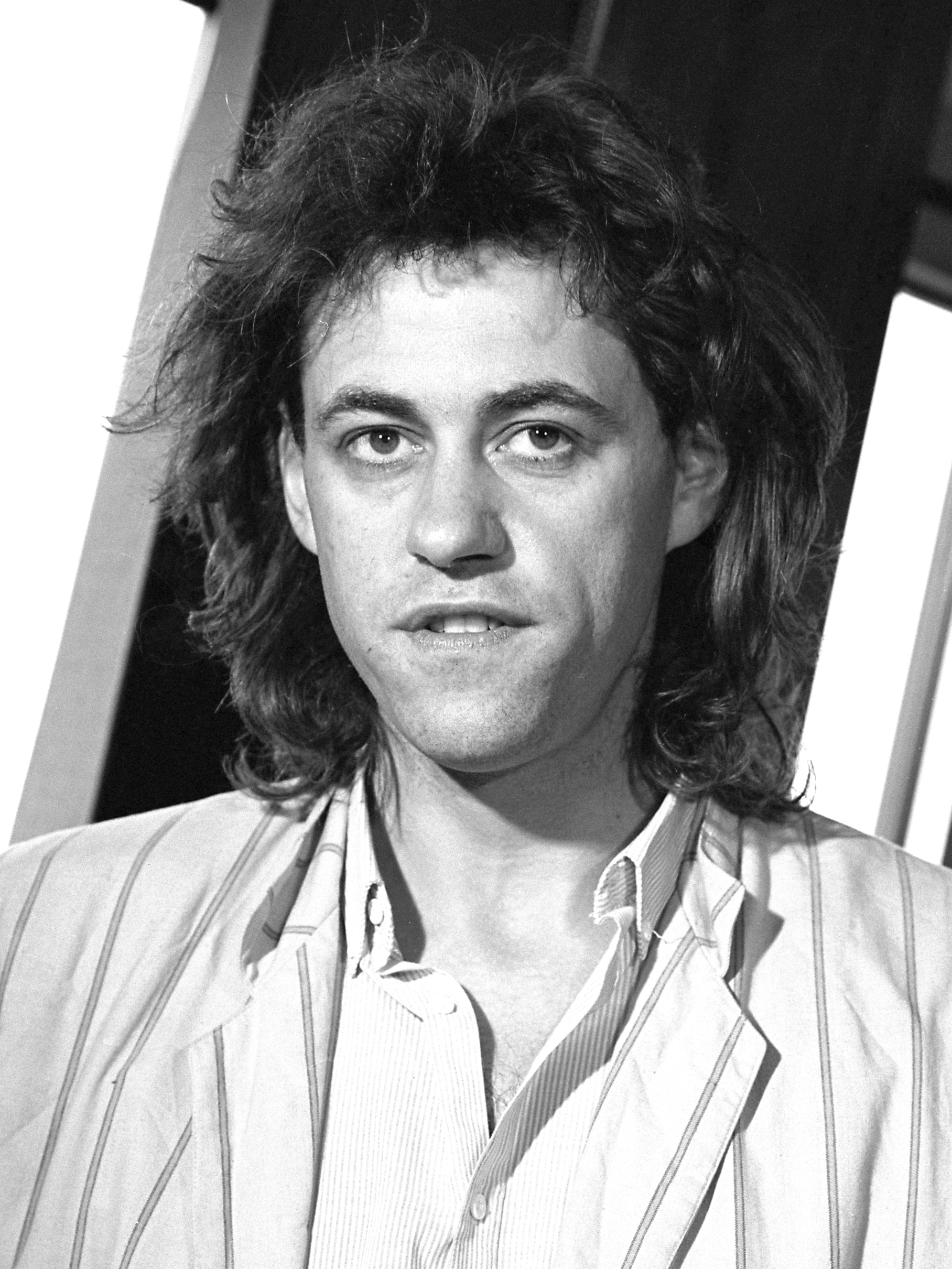
Geldof in 1985

Geldof returned to Ireland in 1975 and became the lead singer of the Boomtown Rats, a rock group closely linked with the punk movement. In 1978, the Boomtown Rats had their first No. 1 single in the UK with "Rat Trap", the first new wave chart-topper in Britain. In 1979, they gained international attention with their second UK No. 1, "I Don't Like Mondays". This song was both successful and controversial. Geldof had written it in the aftermath of Brenda Ann Spencer's attempted massacre at an elementary school in San Diego, California, in 1979. In 1980, the Boomtown Rats released the album Mondo Bongo.

Geldof became known as a colourful interview subject. The Boomtown Rats' first appearance on Ireland's The Late Late Show saw Geldof as deliberately brusque to host Gay Byrne and during his interview, he attacked Irish politicians and the Catholic Church, which he described as "a form of social repression" and blamed for many of the country's problems. He responded to nuns in the audience who tried to shout him down by saying they had "an easy life with no material worries in return for which they gave themselves body and soul to the church". He also criticised Blackrock College, where he had been beaten by the priests. The interview, which "lit a fire under Ireland's youth", caused uproar, making it impossible for the Boomtown Rats to play in Ireland again.

In January 2013, Geldof announced that the Boomtown Rats would be reforming to play together for the first time since 1986 at that year's Isle of Wight Festival in June. They subsequently announced further tour dates and released a new CD Back to Boomtown: Classic Rats Hits.

=== After the Boomtown Rats ===
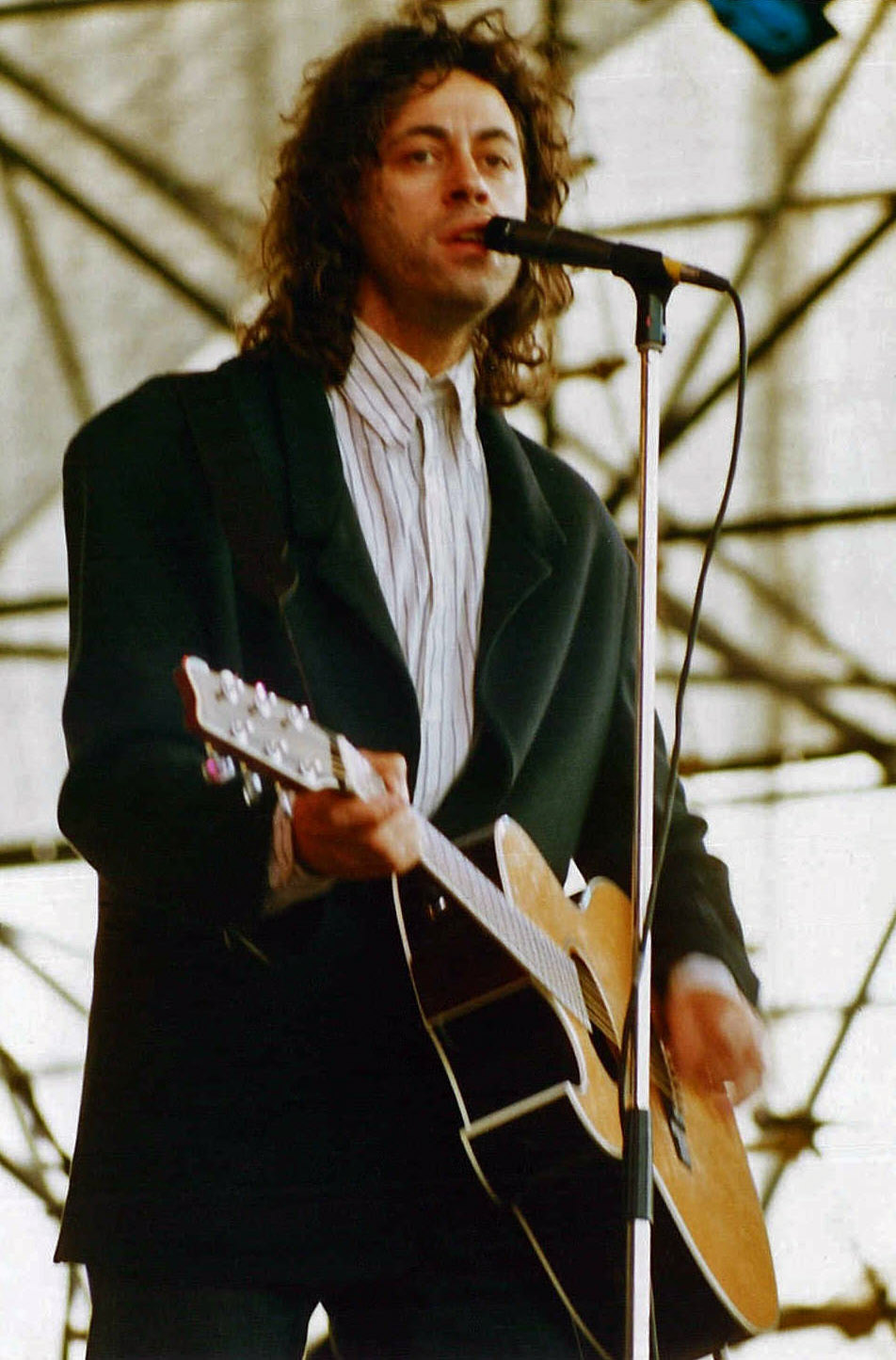
Geldof performing as a solo artist in 1987

Geldof left the Boomtown Rats in 1986 to launch a solo career and publish his autobiography, Is That It?, which was a UK best-seller.

His first solo records sold reasonably well and spawned the hit singles "This Is The World Calling" (co-written with Dave Stewart of Eurythmics) and "The Great Song of Indifference". He also occasionally performed with other artists, such as David Gilmour and Thin Lizzy. A performance of "Comfortably Numb" with Gilmour is documented in the DVD release David Gilmour in Concert (2002). In 1992, he performed at the Freddie Mercury Tribute Concert with the surviving members of Queen at the old Wembley Stadium, singing a song he jokingly claimed to have co-written with Mercury, called "Too Late God". (The song was actually co-written by Karl Hyde.)

Geldof has also worked as a DJ for XFM radio. In 1998, he erroneously announced Ian Dury's death from cancer, possibly due to hoax information from a listener who was disgruntled at the station's change of ownership. The event caused music paper NME, which had been involved in a running feud with Geldof since his Boomtown Rats days, primarily because of his disparagement of The Clash, to call Geldof 'the world's worst DJ'.

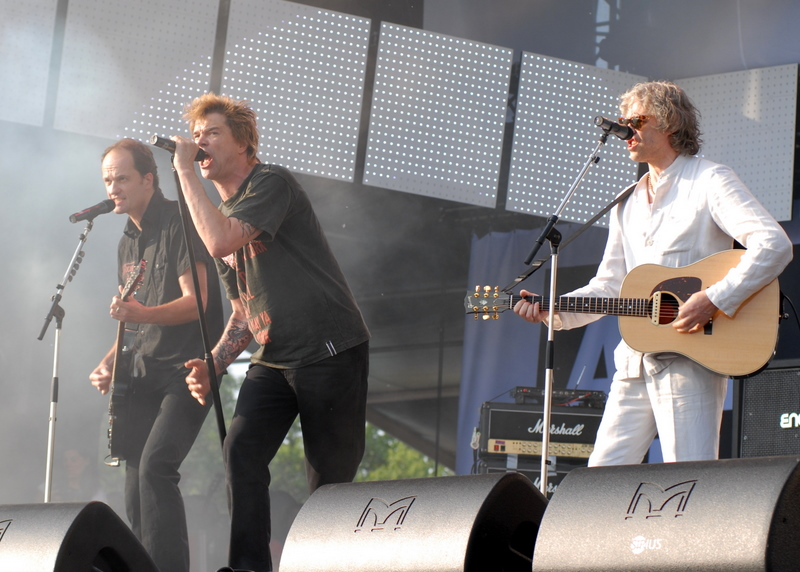
Geldof performing with Die Toten Hosen at Your Voice Against Poverty concert in Rostock, Germany on 7 June 2007

In 2002, he was listed as one of the 100 Greatest Britons in a poll conducted among the general public, despite not being British.

After Live 8, Geldof returned to his career as a musician by releasing a box set containing all of his solo albums, titled Great Songs of Indifference – The Anthology 1986–2001, in late 2005. Following that release, Geldof toured, although with mixed success.

In July 2006, Geldof arrived at Milan's Arena Civica, a venue capable of holding 12,000 people, to play a scheduled concert, and found that the organisers had not put tickets on general sale and that only 45 people had shown up. Geldof refused to go on stage when he found how small the attendance was. To offer compensation for fans, Geldof signed autographs for those who had shown up. He played a well-attended free Storytellers concert for MTV Italy in Naples in October 2006.

The Boomtown Rats reformed in 2025 for a 12-date, 50th anniversary tour of the UK. A two-album compilation on vinyl and CD, "The First 50 Years: Songs of Boomtown Glory", was released on 19 September 2025.

== Charity work ==
Geldof's first major charity involvement took place in September 1981 when he performed as a solo artist for Amnesty International's benefit show The Secret Policeman's Other Ball, held at Drury Lane theatre in London's West End. At the invitation of Amnesty show producer Martin Lewis, Geldof performed a solo version of "I Don't Like Mondays". Other rock artists had 'planted a seed' and appeared to have affected Geldof in a similar manner. Monty Python alumnus John Cleese conceived and directed the show, and on its impact on Geldof, Sting stated "he took the 'Ball' and ran with it."

=== Band Aid ===
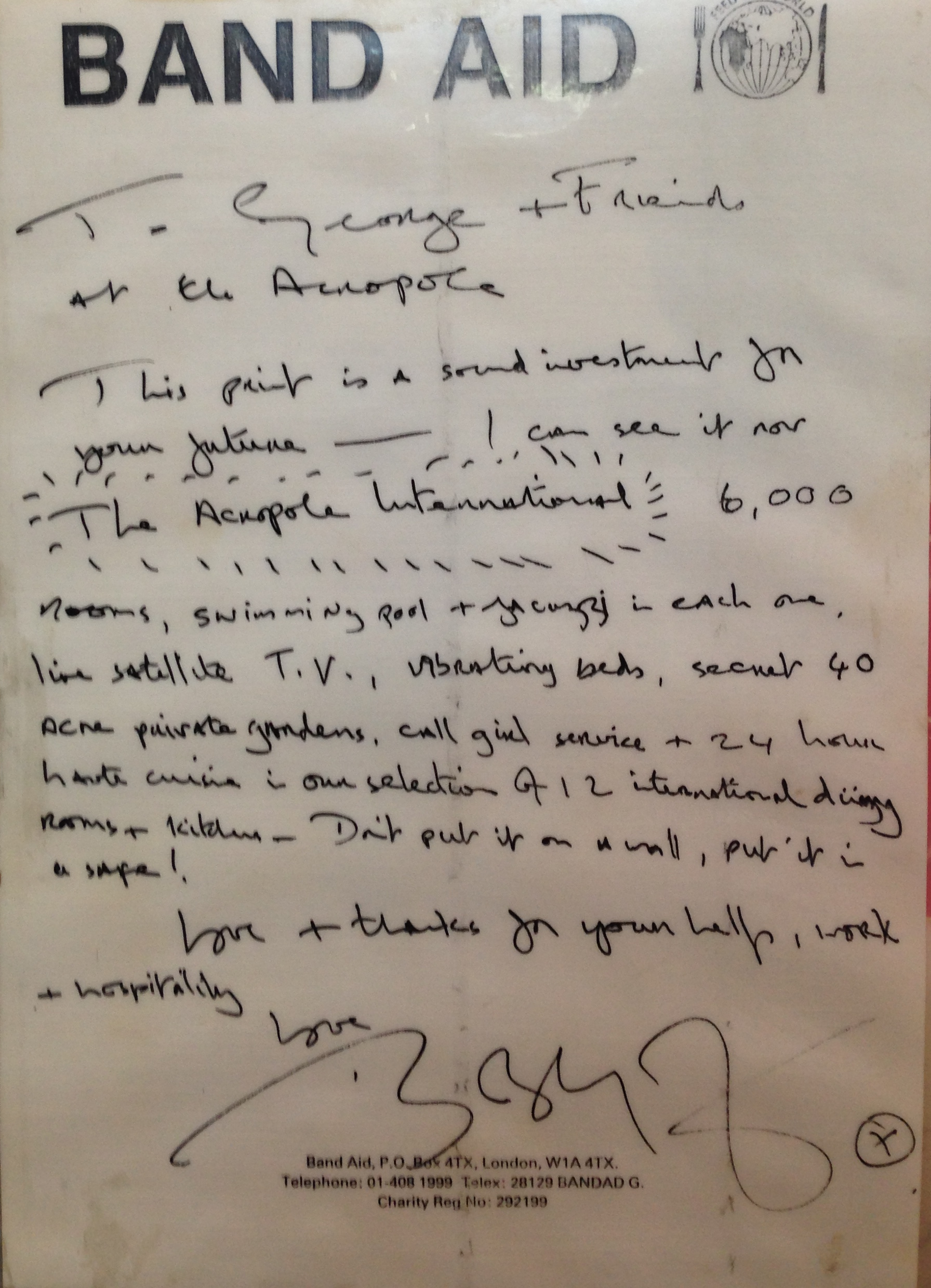
Letter of thanks from Geldof to the Acropole Hotel in Khartoum, Sudan, for supporting Band Aid during the 1980s drought in Darfur and Ethiopia

In 1984, Geldof responded to a BBC News report from Michael Buerk about the famine in Ethiopia by mobilising the pop world to do something about the images he had seen. With Midge Ure of Ultravox he wrote "Do They Know It's Christmas?" in order to raise funds. The song was recorded in a single day at Sarm West Studios in Notting Hill, London on 25 November 1984, by various artists performing under the name of Band Aid.

In its first week of release, the single became the UK's fastest-seller of all time. It entered the UK singles chart at number one and stayed there for five weeks, becoming the Christmas number one of 1984. It sold over three million copies, making it the biggest-selling single in UK history up to that point, a title it held for almost 13 years. The single was also a major US hit, peaking at number 13 on the Billboard Hot 100 and selling an estimated 2.5 million copies in the US by January 1985. The single sold 11.7 million copies worldwide.

New versions of "Do They Know It's Christmas?" were recorded in 1989 and 2004. In November 2014, Geldof announced that he would be forming a further incarnation of Band Aid, to be known as Band Aid 30, to record an updated version of the charity single, with the proceeds going to treat victims of the Ebola virus in West Africa.

=== Live Aid ===
"The greatest legacy of Live Aid for me personally, is the example of how Bob Geldof's leadership demonstrated the power of the individual. How the voice and action of just one person could start a movement that could make a difference."

— Live Aid production manager Andy Zweck.

As Geldof began to learn more about the situation, he discovered that one of the main reasons why African nations were in such dire peril was the obligation to make repayments on loans that their countries had taken from Western banks. For every pound donated in aid, ten times as much would have to leave the country in loan repayments. It became obvious that one song was not enough.

Geldof and Ure organised Live Aid, a huge event staged simultaneously on 13 July 1985 at Wembley Stadium in London and John F. Kennedy Stadium in Philadelphia. Thanks to an unprecedented decision by the BBC to clear its schedules for 16 hours of rock music, the event was also broadcast live in the UK on television and radio. It was one of the most monumental stage shows in history. Phil Collins flew on Concorde so that he could play at both Wembley and Philadelphia on the same day. During the broadcast of Live Aid, Geldof shocked viewers into giving cash by twice mouthing profanities, and also by slamming his fist on the table and ordering them not to go out to the pub, but to stay in and watch the show.

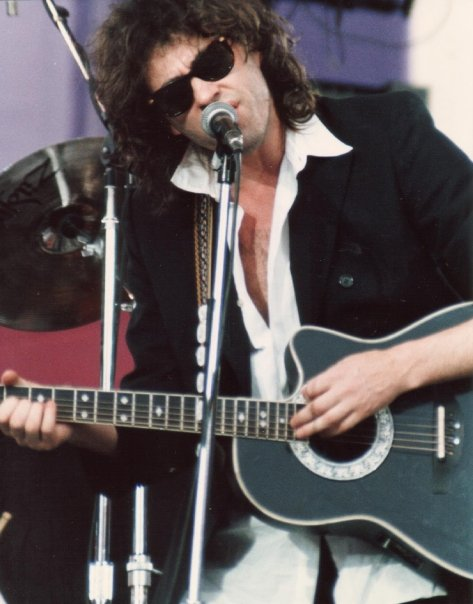
Geldof performing at the Conspiracy of Hope concert on 15 June 1986 in East Rutherford, New Jersey.

Nearly seven hours into the concert in London, Geldof gave an infamous interview in which he used the word fuck. The BBC presenter David Hepworth, conducting the interview, had attempted to provide a list of addresses to which potential donations should be sent. Geldof interrupted him in mid-flow and shouted: "Fuck the address, let's get the [phone] numbers!" It has passed into folklore that he yelled at the audience, "Give us your fucking money!" although Geldof has stated that this phrase was never uttered. Because of his Irish accent, the profanity was stated to be misheard as "fock" and "focking" respectively. After the outburst, donations increased to £300 per second. A harrowing video of dying skeletal children was introduced by David Bowie after the end of his set that had been made by CBC photo-journalists, who set their films to the tune of "Drive" by the Cars.

In total, Live Aid raised over £150 million for famine relief. Geldof subsequently received an honorary knighthood, at age 34, for his efforts. His autobiography, written soon after with Paul Vallely, was titled Is That It?. The book achieved further fame for being featured on the General Certificate of Secondary Education examination syllabus.

Much of the money raised by Live Aid went to NGOs in Ethiopia, some of which were under the influence or control of the Derg military junta. Some journalists suggested that the Derg had used Live Aid and Oxfam money to fund its enforced resettlement and "villagification" programmes, under which at least 3 million people were said to have been displaced and between 50,000 and 100,000 killed. In November 2010 the BBC formally apologised to Geldof for misleading implications in its stories on the subject of Band Aid, and said it had 'no evidence' that Band Aid money specifically went to buy weapons.

=== Commission for Africa ===
In January 2004, on a visit to Africa, Geldof came to believe that more people were at risk of starvation there than had died in the famine of 1984-85 which had prompted Live Aid. He telephoned the British Prime Minister Tony Blair from Addis Ababa. According to the Live 8 programme notes by Geldof's biographer and friend Paul Vallely, the Prime Minister responded: "Calm down Bob. ... And come and see me as soon as you get back."

The result was the Commission for Africa. Blair invited Geldof and 16 other Commissioners, the majority from Africa and many of them politicians in power, to undertake a year-long study of Africa's problems. They came up with two conclusions: that Africa needed to change, to improve its governance and combat corruption; and that the rich world needed to support that change in new ways. That meant doubling aid, cancelling debts and reforming trade rules. The Commission drew up a detailed plan of how that could be done and reported in March 2005. To force the issue, Geldof decided to create a new international lobby for Africa with eight simultaneous concerts performing around the world to put pressure on the G8, which he called Live 8. The commission's recommendations later became the blueprint for the G8 Gleneagles African debt and aid package.

=== Africa Progress Panel ===
Geldof is a member of the Africa Progress Panel (APP), a group of ten distinguished individuals who advocate at the highest levels for equitable and sustainable development in Africa. Every year, the Panel releases a report, the Africa Progress Report, that outlines an issue of immediate importance to the continent and suggests a set of associated policies. In 2012, the Africa Progress Report highlighted issues of Jobs, Justice and Equity. The 2013 report outlined issues relating to oil, gas and mining in Africa.

=== DATA and One Campaign ===
Geldof worked closely with DATA (Debt, AIDS, Trade, Africa), an organisation founded by U2's Bono in 2002 to promote debt relief, third-world trade and AIDS relief in Africa. It merged with One Campaign in 2008, where Geldof also is very active. In June 2009, on behalf of One Campaign, he co-edited a special edition of the Italian newspaper La Stampa with a view on 35th G8 summit.

=== Live 8 concerts ===
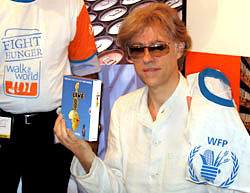
Geldof at a Live 8: DVD signing in 2007

On 31 March 2005, Geldof and Ure announced the Live 8 project, to raise awareness of issues that burden Africa, including government debt, trade barriers, hunger and AIDS issues. Geldof organised ten concerts on 2 July 2005 in large cities throughout the industrialised world. They featured musicians from different genres and locations around the world. The cities where Live 8 concerts were played were in industrialised countries and drew huge crowds. The locations were London, Paris, Berlin, Rome, Philadelphia, Barrie, Chiba, Johannesburg, Moscow, Cornwall and Edinburgh.

The concerts were free, and were scheduled just days before world leaders gathered in Gleneagles, for the G8 economic summit, on 6 July. Ure organised the 'final push' Live 8 concert at Edinburgh. 'The boys and girls with guitars will finally get to turn the world on its axis,' Geldof said in a statement. Pink Floyd's performance in London was their first since 1981 to include original vocalist/bassist Roger Waters.

=== Night for Ukraine benefit ===
Geldof performed his rendition of Nick Lowe's "(What's So Funny 'Bout) Peace, Love, and Understanding" at Night for Ukraine, a fundraising benefit held at the Roundhouse in north London on the evening of 9 March 2022, with the funds raised being donated to the Disasters Emergency Committee appeal, to provide aid to people fleeing Ukraine following the Russian invasion. The event was organised by Fabien Riggall in collaboration with the Ukrainian pop duo Bloom Twins.

== Criticism of his charity work ==
Although part of the campaign "Make Poverty History" (MPH), Live 8 was accused by John Hilary, then a senior executive of the campaign, of hijacking MPH by planning its concerts on the same day as the march in Edinburgh, which was said to be the biggest social justice march in Scottish history.

Geldof was also criticised for the lack of African acts performing at Live 8. Geldof responded that only the biggest-selling artists would attract the huge audience required to capture the attention of the world in the run-up to the G8 meeting. In the lead-up to the G8 summit, Geldof, who had been a member of Tony Blair's Commission for Africa on which the Gleneagles recommendations were largely based, labelled Kumi Naidoo's criticism of the summit "a disgrace". Some leading African campaigners have asked Geldof to stand down from the global anti-poverty movement, and the New Internationalist (between January and February 2006) said 'It would be long overdue if he did.'

There were also accusations that Live 8 gave unqualified support to the personal and political agendas of Blair and Gordon Brown, particularly in the lead-up to an election. Though many felt that it was the British politicians who had accepted Geldof's agenda rather than the other way round, this led to accusations that Geldof had compromised his cause.

The promises made for Africa at the Gleneagles summit were widely praised: "the greatest summit for Africa ever" (Kofi Annan), "an important, if incomplete, boost to the development prospects of the poorest countries" economist (Jeffrey Sachs) or "a major breakthrough on debt" (Kevin Wakins, former head of research at Oxfam). But many aid agencies pronounced their disappointment with the outcome, feeling that the strict conditions imposed on African countries for accepting debt relief left them little better off than before. The New Internationalist scathingly stated, since becoming prominent in the salvation of Africa, "Geldof has re-released the entire back catalogue of the Boomtown Rats."

Oasis guitarist Noel Gallagher became one of the more vocal sceptics about the impact of Live 8, citing his belief that rock stars have less influence over world leaders than popular culture may believe. His explanation was:

Correct me if I'm wrong, but are they hoping that one of these guys from the G8 is on a quick 15-minute break at Gleneagles and sees Annie Lennox singing "Sweet Dreams" and thinks, 'Fuck me, she might have a point there, you know?' And Keane doing "Somewhere Only We Know" and some Japanese businessman going, 'Aw, look at him. ... we should really fucking drop that debt, you know.' It's not going to happen, is it?

== Controversies ==
Geldof swore on the music television programme CD:UK, saying "Fuck the tape" while concluding his chat with Cat Deeley. At the NME awards in 2006, when accepting an award, Geldof referred to the host Russell Brand as a "cunt". Brand responded by saying "It's no wonder Bob Geldof knows so much about famine—he's been dining out on 'I Don't Like Mondays' for 30 years". Brand would later be imprisoned in 2026 for rape and sexual assault.

In mid-July 2006, he infuriated many New Zealanders by criticising the New Zealand government's foreign aid contribution as "shameful" and "pathetic". Winston Peters, the Minister of Foreign Affairs, responded that Geldof failed to recognise the "quality" of New Zealand aid as well as other New Zealand contributions.

During mid-November 2008, a local for-profit organisation, Diversity@Work, invited Geldof to Melbourne to speak about Third World poverty and the failure of governments to combat the crisis. It was later revealed that he was paid $100,000 for his speech, which included a luxury hotel room and first-class airfares.

=== Mauritius Leaks ===
After being criticised earlier in the decade for his stance on aid to African countries, in July 2019, according to a report on its "Mauritius Leaks" project by the International Consortium of Investigative Journalists (ICIJ), Geldof was mentioned as allegedly involved in tax avoidance by corporations and individuals doing business in Africa and other continents. His private equity fund 8 Miles (named after the shortest distance between Europe and Africa: the eight-mile [13 km] width of the Strait of Gibraltar), which aimed to generate a 20 per cent return by exclusively buying stakes in African startup businesses, had set up subsidiaries in the tax haven of Mauritius, "an offshore jurisdiction with a wide network of double taxation treaties in interesting markets". Geldof declined to comment on the leaks.

== Businessman ==
By 1992, Geldof had established himself as a businessman through co-ownership of the TV production company Planet 24, which made early-morning Channel 4 show The Big Breakfast. Planet 24 was sold to Carlton TV in 1999. TV production company Ten Alps was founded the next day by Geldof and business partner Alex Connock. In April 2011, a new entertainment-formats company, Pretend, was launched.

The Dictionary of Man, announced by Geldof in 2007, is a project he started with director John Maguire, and is financed by the BBC. It was planned that the collected material would be displayed on a website and be available for distribution through DVDs, books, magazines, CDs and exhibitions. Geldof reportedly had been planning it since he visited Niger in the 1980s when he became aware of the number of native languages becoming lost forever as native speakers died.

As of 2009, he served a term as patron of the Exeter Entrepreneurs' Society at the University of Exeter.

Geldof is chairman of 8 Miles, a private equity firm active in Africa.

=== Groupcall ===
In 2002, he became a founding partner of Groupcall, which specialises in providing communication software and data extraction tools to the education, public and business sectors. His initial involvement arose from concerns for his children's safety.

== Views ==
=== Politics ===
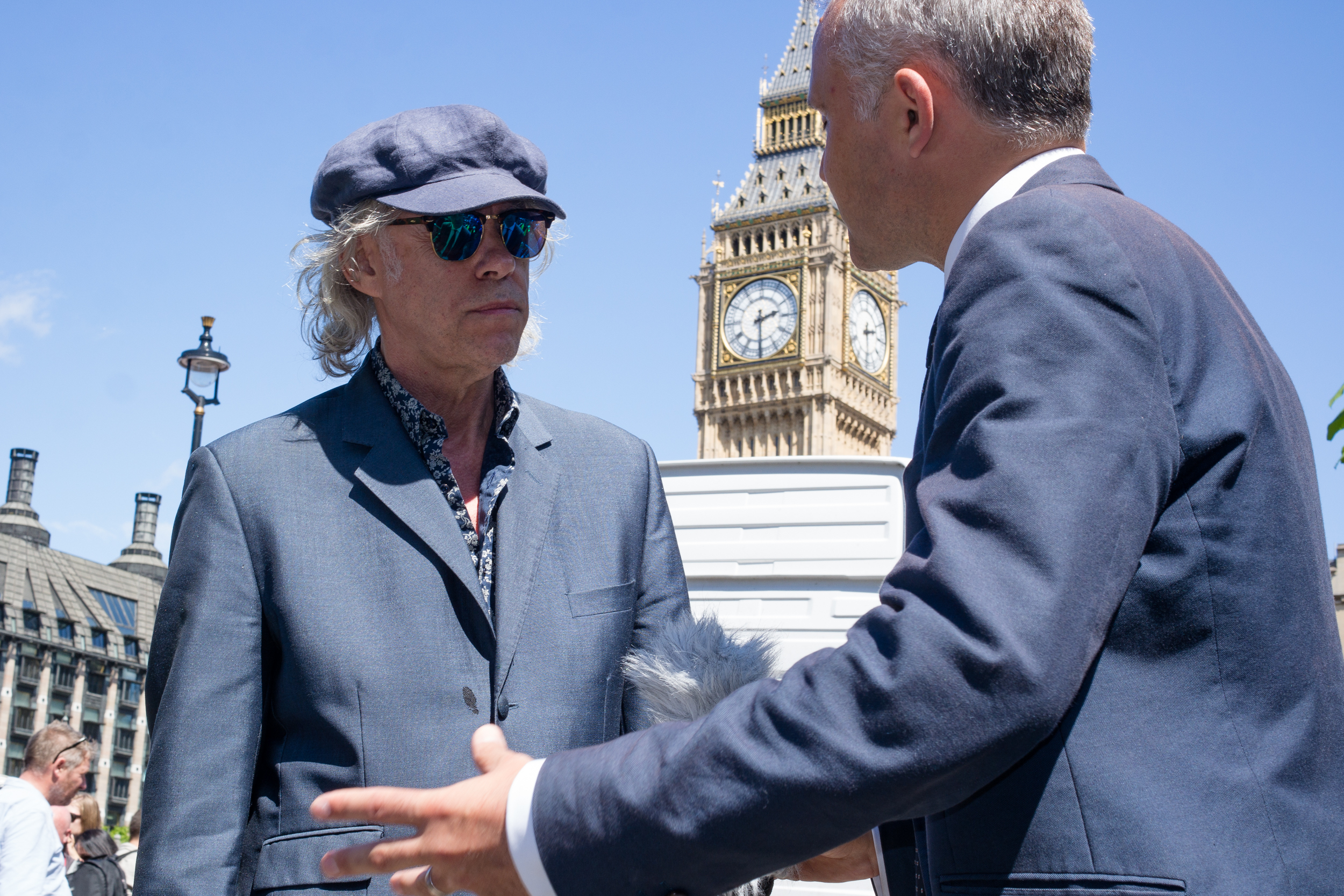
Geldof outside the Houses of Parliament in London during the Brexit Protest March on 2 July 2016

In 2002, Geldof appeared in an advertisement opposing the possibility of the United Kingdom joining the single EU currency, saying it was "not anti-European to be against the euro". He also criticised the European Union in 2003 for what he called its "pathetic" response to Ethiopia's food crisis. MEP Glenys Kinnock responded that Geldof's comments were "unhelpful and misinformed".

In 2003, during a visit to Ethiopia, Geldof praised President George W. Bush's proposal to fight AIDS in Africa.

Geldof has stated that he is uninterested in party politics: "I've said I'll shake hands with the devil on my left and the devil on my right to get to where we need to be." In December 2005, Geldof agreed to give advice on global poverty to the Conservative Party. Ahead of the 2024 United Kingdom general election Geldof posted a video endorsing the re-election of Andrew Mitchell, a Conservative candidate and the Minister of State for Development and Africa.

In July 2025, Geldof accused Israeli authorities of "lying" about the famine caused by the Israeli blockade of the Gaza Strip. "Israel is preventing food from reaching hungry, terrified and exhausted mothers. While these mothers gather to receive a small amount of food through the absurd spectacle created under the guise of humanitarian aid, they are enticed and then mercilessly shot," he said. He also criticised the strict censorship of news and social media in Israel.

=== Anti-nationalism ===
Geldof generally holds anti-nationalist views, having broadly condemned nationalism as an ideology, condemning both Irish and English nationalism specifically over the decades. Geldof has described patriotism as "entirely good and healthy" in that it provides "a real sense of who you are, who you belong to, a sense of place and belonging to something" but warns that "Evil men and women of ill intent can turn that natural sense of place and belonging into a political philosophy that only leads to blood".

==== Freedom of Dublin, Easter Rising and Aung San Suu Kyi comments ====
In 2016, when Ireland was marking the 100th anniversary of the Easter Rising, Geldof caused controversy when he likened Patrick Pearse's call for a "blood sacrifice" to the dogma of Islamist suicide bombers. The uprising in Dublin against British rule was a key event that led to Irish independence. In 2018, Geldof called the Easter Rising the "original sin" of the Irish state, rejecting the idea that the blood sacrifice of 1916 was heroic, and linking it to the isolationism and theocratic oppression of de Valera's Ireland, while viewing the Irish Famine as the true linchpin moment in Irish history that shaped the country's trajectory.

In 2017, Geldof returned his Freedom of Dublin award in protest at Burmese leader Aung San Suu Kyi holding the same honour. He said he does not want to be associated "with an individual currently engaged in the mass ethnic cleansing of the Rohingya people". He added that if Suu Kyi "is stripped of her Dublin Freedom, perhaps the council would see fit to restore to me that which I take such pride in". The Lord Mayor of Dublin, Mícheál Mac Donncha, accused Geldof of hypocrisy, saying "I find it ironic that he makes this gesture while proudly retaining his title as Knight Commander of the Order of the British Empire, given the shameful record of British imperialism".

One month later, Dublin City Council voted to revoke the Freedom of the City from both Suu Kyi and Geldof, with several councillors saying Geldof had "insulted" Dublin. Geldof was furious at the decision to revoke his award, calling it a "Sinn Féin stitch-up" because of his Easter Rising comments.

==== Brexit ====
Geldof opposed Brexit, the withdrawal of the United Kingdom from the European Union, and repudiated it as "an expression of English nationalism", describing it as a serious mistake and predicting it would be a "disaster" for both Britain and Ireland. He criticised the British government under Prime Minister Theresa May as "incapable and inept". He contrasted its handling of the issue with what he saw as the patient and pragmatic approach of the Irish government, emphasising that in Ireland "we know where [nationalism] leads to". While arguing against Brexit, he acknowledged the broader debate over Europe's future and argued that the European Union itself needed restructuring from top to bottom.

Shortly before the Brexit referendum on 23 June 2016, in what was described as the "most surreal day in British politics ever", Geldof led a flotilla on the River Thames to attack an opposition flotilla led by Eurosceptic politician Nigel Farage. Later that year, Geldof campaigned for the Liberal Democrat candidate Sarah Olney at the Richmond Park by-election. He described Brexit as "the greatest act of national self-harm" in British history and vowed to "undermine" Theresa May every step of the way. He said the EU was "a mess" but warned Britain's young people had their futures "taken from them" as a result of the referendum.

=== Anti-authoritarianism ===
Geldof has criticised authoritarian leaders around the world. In 2016, he denounced Putin, Erdogan, Xi Jinping and Donald Trump as "thugs", adding in 2020 that "Putin is a weak man, a gangster. Xi Jinping is a repressive dictator. Erdogan is a religious fantasist, Trump is a vulgar fool".

=== Fathers' rights ===
From January 2002 until sometime in 2005, Geldof listened very closely to Father's Rights campaigners; it was reported that he had sacks of mail arriving at his door on a daily basis from fathers who were unhappy with the British family courts. He said: "I am heartbroken. I just cannot believe what happens to people, what is done to them in the name of the law. You only have to open your eyes to see what I call the 'Sad Dads on Sundays Syndrome'". He has also called for the Children Act to be repealed, and his latest statement to Father's Rights campaigners was, "It's not in my nature to shut up".

=== Climate action and environmentalism ===
In 2007, Geldof contributed to an online debate on hybrid cars and climate change, expressing scepticism about the effectiveness of renewable energy initiatives. While acknowledging he drove a hybrid car mainly to avoid London's congestion charge, he described hybrid technology as "not coherent" and dismissed wind and wave power as "Mickey Mouse". Geldof argued that behavioural change through taxation can influence actions, but technologies like hybrids alone are insufficient to address climate change. He advocated for a rapid expansion of nuclear power as the most effective way to reduce environmental impact.

In March 2012, Geldof expressed concern about rising population and falling water levels in Arab countries. He also predicted famine, plague and wars if the population did not stabilise. Geldof asked countries to lower their birth rates to lessen the burden on the environment. "We must see the possibility of life, not just to individual children, but to the human species," he said. "And I'm not that optimistic."

In a 2019 Guardian article, Geldof discussed his climate action views; he noted that after decades of decline, global hunger has begun rising again, with 820 million people facing chronic food insecurity, and that small-holder farmers are particularly affected by extreme weather events. He also emphasised that food production contributes to climate change through methane emissions and deforestation. Geldof argued that achieving the UN Sustainable Development Goals, particularly zero hunger, requires immediate investment in small-holder farmers and coordination among governments, international organisations and private actors. He cited the Global Agriculture and Food Security Programme as an example of effective international cooperation and noted upcoming global summits as opportunities to address hunger while maintaining environmental sustainability.

In October 2022, Geldof expressed support for climate activists who threw soup over Van Gogh's Sunflowers at the National Gallery in London, describing their actions as "1,000% right" and "clever" because the painting was protected by glass and not damaged. He acknowledged that while the act was annoying, it drew attention to the urgency of climate change, which he considered a greater threat than temporary disruption. Geldof also commented on the broader climate movement, stating he supported the passion and bravery of activists and rejected the idea that Western humanitarian efforts should be dismissed as "white saviour" interventions.

=== Sex work and AIDS prevention ===
During a special session at the XX International AIDS Conference, 2014, Geldof referred to sex workers as "hookers", for which he was subsequently criticised. Christian Vega, a sex workers' rights activist, criticised speakers (including Geldof) for their use of what he viewed as pejorative language; Vega contended that this language perpetuated stigmas that are among the key barriers to HIV prevention. Geldof responded to the criticism during the closing session of the conference: "I read today in the paper that my talk yesterday was littered with profanities—fuck them." In Geldof's view, rights-based language hampered HIV prevention, and he defended using terms such as "hookers" and "junkies", saying: "Let's not get distracted by diversionary language. Let's call it as it is." In a radio show after the conference on Joy 94.9, Vega dismissed Geldof's view that rights-based language was a waste of time as "ridiculous". In Vega's view, this language served as an important tool to challenge stigma and discrimination, particularly within an HIV context.

== Awards and honours ==
Geldof has received many awards for his fundraising work including being invested by Elizabeth II as an honorary Knight Commander of the Order of the British Empire in 1986. Geldof is entitled to use the post-nominal letters "KBE" but not to be styled "Sir", as he is not a citizen of a Commonwealth realm; nevertheless the nickname "Sir Bob" has stuck, and media reports continue to refer to him as "Sir Bob Geldof".

In 1985, Geldof was made a Grand Officer of the Order of the Two Niles by Sudan's president Abdel Rahman Swar al-Dahab. In 1986 Geldof was made a Freeman of the Borough of Swale in north Kent, England. Geldof had for some years been resident in the borough at Davington Priory, Faversham, and he was still living there as of 2013. He received his award during a special meeting of the Swale Borough Council from the mayor, Councillor Richard Moreton, and the mayoress, Rose Moreton.

In 2006 the New Statesman magazine conducted a survey of their readers to find the Heroes of our Time; Geldof was voted third behind Aung San Suu Kyi and Nelson Mandela.

=== Other awards ===
- 2005: received a Man of Peace Award.
- 2006: awarded the medal of Chevalier de l'Ordre des Arts et des Lettres.
- 2006: awarded the Freedom of the City of Dublin for his humanitarian work. In 2017, Geldof returned the award in a protest at Myanmar leader Aung San Suu Kyi holding the same honour. Dublin City Council voted to revoke both Suu Kyi's and Geldof's awards.
- 2010: awarded Hon. Master of Arts degree from the University for the Creative Arts.
- 2013: awarded the Freedom of the City of London.
- 2014: awarded with BASCA Gold Badge Award in recognition of his unique contribution to the field of music production.

== Personal life ==
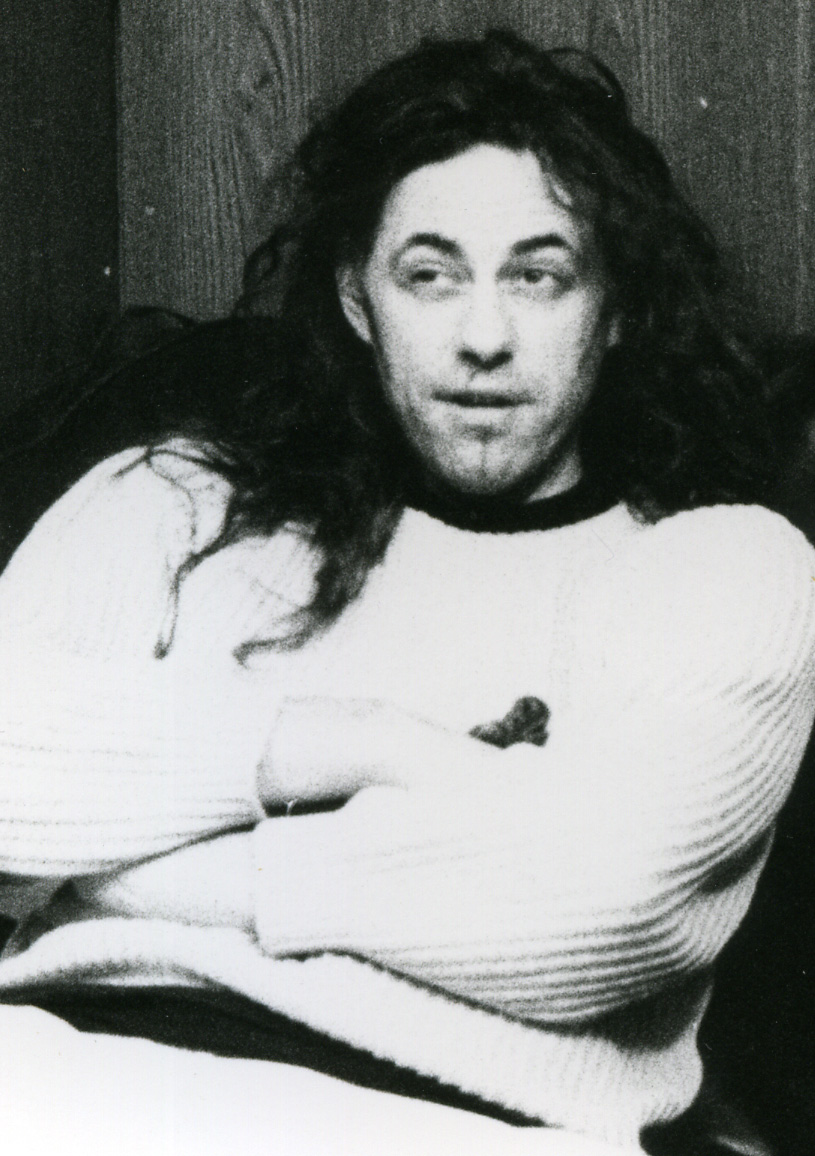
Geldof in 1991

Geldof's longtime girlfriend and first wife was Paula Yates. Yates was a rock journalist, and later became the presenter of the music show The Tube, which ran from 1982 to 1987. She was known for her in-bed interviews on the show The Big Breakfast from 1992. Geldof met Yates when she became an obsessed fan of the Boomtown Rats during the band's early days. They became a couple in 1976 after Yates flew to Paris to surprise him when the band was playing there.

Before they were married, the couple had their first daughter, Fifi Trixibelle Geldof, born 31 March 1983. She was named Fifi after Bob's aunt Fifi and Trixibelle because Yates wanted a 'belle' in the family.

After 10 years together, Geldof and Yates married in June 1986 in Las Vegas, with Simon Le Bon of Duran Duran as Geldof's best man. The couple later had two more daughters, Peaches Honeyblossom Geldof (known as Peaches Geldof) on 13 March 1989, and Little Pixie Geldof (known as Pixie Geldof) on 17 September 1990. Pixie is said to be named after a celebrity daughter character from the cartoon Celeb in the satirical magazine Private Eye, itself a lampoon of the names the Geldofs gave to their other children.

In February 1995, Yates left Geldof for Michael Hutchence, the lead singer of Australian band INXS. Yates had first met Hutchence in 1985 when she interviewed him on The Tube. Geldof and Yates divorced in May 1996. Yates and Hutchence had a daughter, Heavenly Hiraani Tiger Lily Hutchence (known as Tiger), in July 1996.

Hutchence died by suicide in a Sydney hotel room on 22 November 1997. After Hutchence's death, Geldof and Yates each gave police statements on the phone calls they exchanged with Hutchence that morning; however, they did not volunteer their phone records. Yates' statement on 26 November included: "He was frightened and couldn't stand a minute more without his baby ... [he] was terribly upset and he said, 'I don't know how I'll live without seeing Tiger.'" Yates contended that Geldof had repeatedly said: "Don't forget, I am above the law," referring to his influence since Live Aid. Geldof's police statements and evidence to the coroner indicated that he patiently listened to Hutchence who was "hectoring and abusive and threatening." A friend of Yates and Geldof confirmed the substance of this call and added that Geldof had said, "I know what time the call ended, it was 20 to 7, I was going to log it as a threatening call." The occupant in the hotel room next to Hutchence's heard a loud male voice and swearing at about 5:00 a.m. The coroner was satisfied that this voice was Hutchence arguing with Geldof.

Geldof later went to court and obtained full custody of his three children. He has since become an outspoken advocate of fathers' rights. After Yates' death from a heroin overdose in 2000, Geldof became the legal guardian of Tiger Hutchence and later adopted her in 2007. As of 2022, Tiger's legal name is Heavenly Hiraani Tiger Lily Hutchence-Geldof.

In April 2014, Geldof's daughter Peaches died at the age of 25 of a heroin overdose. He stated the family was "beyond pain" after he confirmed the news of her death.

Geldof announced his engagement to French actress Jeanne Marine, his partner of 18 years, on 1 May 2014, and they were married in France on 28 April 2015. They currently live in Battersea, South London.

According to The Sunday Times Rich List, Geldof was worth £32 million in 2012.

== Discography ==
=== Solo albums ===
Year	Title	Peak chart positions									
Year	Title	UK	AUS	AUT	GER	IRE	NL	NOR	SWE	SWI	US
1986	Deep in the Heart of Nowhere: Released: 24 November 1986; Label: Mercury (UK) / Atlantic (US)	79	—	—	27	—	—	3	18	15	130
1990	The Vegetarians of Love: Released: 23 July 1990; Label: Mercury (UK) / Atlantic (US)	21	43	27	15	—	37	—	—	20	-
1992	The Happy Club: Released: 5 October 1992; Label: Mercury (UK) / Atlantic (US)	—	91	—	60	52	—	73	—	39	—
2001	Sex, Age & Death: Released: 1 October 2001; Label: Eagle Records (UK) / Koch Records (US)	134	—	—	—	—	—	—	—	—	—
2010	How to Compose Popular Songs That Will Sell: Released: 12 October 2010; Label: Mercury (UK) / Atlantic (US)	89	—	—	—	87	—	—	—	—	—
"—" denotes a release that did not chart.

=== Compilation albums ===
Year	Title	Peak chart positions
Year	Title	UK
1994	Loudmouth – The Best of Bob Geldof and the Boomtown Rats: includes solo recordings and Boomtown Rats songs; Released: 27 June 1994; Label: Vertigo	10
2005	Great Songs of Indifference: The Anthology 1986–2001: Box Set including the first 4 solo albums; Released: 14 November 2005; Label: Mercury	—
"—" denotes a release that did not chart.

=== Singles ===
Year	Title	Chart positions									Album
Year	Title	UK	AUS	GER	IRE	NL	NOR	SWE	SWI	US	Album
1986	"This Is the World Calling"	25	93	28	1	29	1	10	18	82^{[A]}	Deep in the Heart of Nowhere
1987	"Love Like a Rocket"	61	—	18	21	76	11	60	—	—	Deep in the Heart of Nowhere
1987	"Heartless Heart"	—	—	—	—	—	—	—	—	—	Deep in the Heart of Nowhere
1987	"I Cry Too"	—	—	—	—	—	—	—	—	—	Deep in the Heart of Nowhere
1987	"In the Pouring Rain"	—	—	—	—	—	—	—	—	—	Deep in the Heart of Nowhere
1990	"The Great Song of Indifference"	15	25	20	7	16	—	—	—	—	Vegetarians of Love
1990	"Love or Something"	86	74	55	—	—	—	—	—	—^{[B]}	Vegetarians of Love
1990	"A Gospel Song"	—	—	—	—	—	—	—	—	—	Vegetarians of Love
1992	"Room 19 (Sha La La La Lee)"	—	—	53	—	—	—	—	—	—	Happy Club
1992	"My Hippy Angel"	—	143	—	—	—	—	—	—		Happy Club
1993	"The Happy Club"	—	—	—	—	—	—	—	—	—	Happy Club
1993	"Yeah, Definitely"	—	—	—	—	—	—	—	—	—	Happy Club
1994	"Crazy"	65	—	72	—	—	—	—	—	—	Loudmouth – The Best of Bob Geldof & the Boomtown Rats
1996	"Rat Trap" (Dustin & Geldof)	—	—	—	1	—	—	—	—	—	
2002	"Pale White Girls"	—	—	—	—	—	—	—	—	—	Sex Age & Death
2011	"Silly Pretty Thing"	146	—	—	—	—	—	—	—	—	How To Compose Popular Songs That Will Sell
2011	"Here's To You"	—	—	—	—	—	—	—	—	—	How To Compose Popular Songs That Will Sell

Table Notes

- A "This Is the World Calling" also charted at No. 23 on Billboard Mainstream Rock Tracks Chart.
- B "Love or Something" charted at No. 24 on Billboard Modern Rock Tracks Chart.

== Film appearances ==
- Pink Floyd – The Wall (1982) – Pink
- Number One (1985) – Harry 'Flash' Gordon
- Bernard and the Genie (1991 film) – as Himself (cameo)
- Spiceworld (1997) – as himself (cameo)
- Being Mick (2001) – as himself
- I am Bob (short film 2007) – in which he loses a lookalike contest (even after singing the Boomtown Rats' hit "I Don't Like Mondays".)
- Oh My God (2009) – as himself
- Bad Girl (2012) – as George
- A Fanatic Heart: Geldof on Yeats (2016)
- Zombie Plane (2025)

== In literature ==
In the story "Le jour du jugement dernier", from the collection "Les Mémoires de Satan", by Pierre Cormon, God tries to judge Bob Geldof but does not succeed.

== See also ==
- List of atheists in film, radio, television and theatre
- List of honorary British knights and dames
- Millennium Development Goals
