= Queen's performance at Live Aid =

Performance at Live Aid

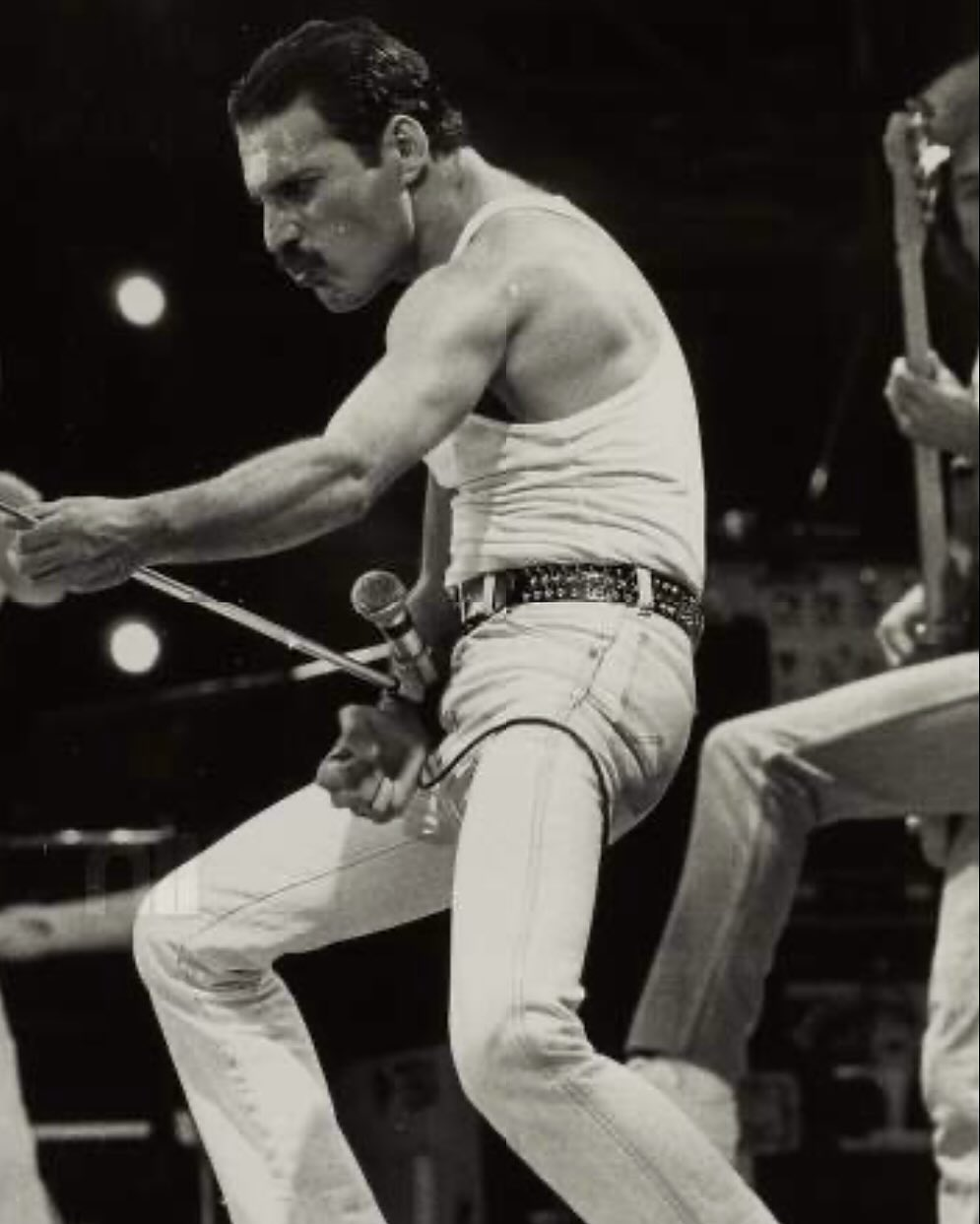
- Freddie Mercury performing with Queen during Live Aid
- Location: London, England
- Venue: Wembley Stadium
- Date: 13 July 1985
- Attendance: c. 72,000
- Part of Live Aid

The British rock band Queen had a 21-minute set at Wembley Stadium during Live Aid on 13 July 1985, which began at 6:41 pm (Note: The exact time it started is disputed. Some sources say it started at 6:42 pm while most say 6:41 pm.). In 2005, it was voted as the best rock gig of all time.

The performance was recreated and is the focal point in the biographical film Bohemian Rhapsody (2018).

== Background ==
Queen were not originally meant to perform at Live Aid. Organiser Bob Geldof believed "their star had risen and fallen", adding: "I was asked to call them and get them to do it. Frankly, I didn't care because if you want one word to explain why punk happened: Queen." Geldof reluctantly agreed to contact the band after being pushed by promoter Harvey Goldsmith. Lead singer Freddie Mercury was worried about their appearance being taken as a "political statement". Geldof managed to convince them otherwise.

== Performance ==
External video
- Queen – Radio Ga Ga (Live Aid 1985); Recording of Queen performing "Radio Ga Ga" at Live Aid.

The performance began at 6:41 pm, opening with an excerpt of "Bohemian Rhapsody". The song transitioned into "Radio Ga Ga", with the crowd clapping in sync with Mercury. After the track, Mercury led the crowd in unison a cappella refrains, and one particular sustained note came to be known as "The Note Heard Round the World". The band finished their set with "Hammer to Fall", "Crazy Little Thing Called Love", a shortened version of "We Will Rock You", and finally "We Are the Champions".

Brian May and Mercury returned to the stage later to perform "Is This the World We Created...?", an acoustic track from the band's most recent album The Works, which was one of the final songs of the Wembley concert.

== Set list ==
Songs
"Bohemian Rhapsody"
"Radio Ga Ga"
a cappella interlude
"Hammer to Fall"
"Crazy Little Thing Called Love"
"We Will Rock You"
"We Are the Champions"

== Lineup ==
Queen

- Freddie Mercury – lead vocals, grand piano, (Note: Freddie played piano on Bohemian Rhapsody and We Are the Champions) rhythm guitar (Note: Freddie played rhythm guitar on Crazy Little Thing Called Love)
- Brian May – lead guitar, acoustic guitar, backing vocals
- John Deacon – bass guitar, backing vocals
- Roger Taylor – drums, percussion, electronic drum pads, backing vocals

Additional musician

- Spike Edney – synthesizer, sampler, vocoder, grand piano, (Note: Spike played piano on Crazy Little Thing Called Love) rhythm guitar, (Note: Spike played rhythm guitar on Hammer to Fall) backing vocals

== In popular culture ==
The gig was recreated in the biographical film Bohemian Rhapsody (2018) as its climax.

In 2020, Queen + Adam Lambert reprised the Live aid set list for the Fire Fight Australia charity concert in Sydney, Australia.

== Reception ==
In 2005, Queen's performance was voted as the best live rock gig of all time. According to the BBC's presenter David Hepworth, their performance produced "the greatest display of community singing the old stadium had seen and cemented Queen's position as the most-loved British group since the Beatles". Paul Brannigan of Classic Rock called it "arguably the most iconic moment of the band's storied career".

At the same year, British journalist John Harris criticized Queen's appearance at the event, saying that he was feeling disgust by their supposed feeling of concern about the situation of the third world, while the band had performed less than a year ago on the South African resort of Sun City. At the time, South Africa was under a cultural boycott, as a part of the wider sanctions in condemnation of the apartheid policy at the time. The band defended themselves by saying that they were a non-political group.

Geldof said: "[They] were absolutely the best band of the day. They played the best, had the best sound, used their time to the full. They understood the idea exactly, that it was a global jukebox. They just went and smashed one hit after another."
