= Live Aid: When Rock 'n' Roll Took on the World =

2025 documentary series

Live Aid: When Rock 'n' Roll Took on the World is a 2025 four-part documentary film series exploring the history of Live Aid, from the origins of the July 1985 concert though its subsequent legacy. The series includes interviews with Bob Geldof, Bono, and Birhan Woldu.

== See also ==
- 1983–1985 famine in Ethiopia
- Debt, AIDS, Trade, Africa (DATA), founded 2002
- Live 8, string of benefit concerts in July 2005
