= List of Live 8 artists =

This is a list of artists who performed at Live 8.

== Park Place, Barrie ==
- African Guitar Summit
- Barenaked Ladies
- Blue Rodeo
- Bruce Cockburn
- Bryan Adams
- Buckcherry
- Celine Dion
- Dan Aykroyd (Host)
- DMC
- Deep Purple
- DobaCaracol
- Snoop Dogg
- Great Big Sea
- Jann Arden
- Jet
- Keith Denehy
- K'naan
- Les Trois Accords
- Mötley Crüe
- Neil Young
- Our Lady Peace
- Pegi Young
- Randy Bachman (and The Carpet Frogs)
- Sam Roberts
- Simple Plan
- Tom Cochrane
- Tom Green (Host)
- Tragically Hip

== Siegessäule, Berlin ==
- a-ha
- Sasha
- Anne Will (Host)
- Audioslave
- BAP
- Brian Wilson
- Chris de Burgh
- Claudia Schiffer (Host, also appeared in Edinburgh)
- Daniel Powter
- Die Toten Hosen
- Faithless
- Green Day
- Herbert Grönemeyer (also appeared in Edinburgh)
- Joana Zimmer
- Juan Diego Flórez
- Juli
- Katherine Jenkins (also appeared in Edinburgh)
- Michael Mittermeier (Host)
- Otto
- Reamonn
- Renee Olstead
- Roxy Music
- Silbermond
- Söhne Mannheims
- Wir sind Helden

== Japan ==
- Björk
- Def Tech
- Do As Infinity
- Dreams Come True
- Good Charlotte
- McFly (also appeared in Edinburgh)
- Rize

== Cornwall - "Africa Calling", Eden Project ==
- Akim El Sikameya
- Angelina Jolie (Host)
- Angelique Kidjo
- Ayub Ogada
- Chartwell Dutiro
- Coco Mbassi
- Daara J
- Dido
- Emmanuel Jal
- Frititi
- Geoffrey Oryema
- Johnny Kalsi (Host)
- Kanda Bongo Man
- Mariza
- Maryam Mursal
- Modou Diouf
- O Fogum
- Peter Gabriel (Host)
- Shikisha
- Siyaya
- Thomas Mapfumo & the Blacks Unlimited
- Tinariwen
- Uno
- Youssou N'Dour

== Edinburgh ==
- 1 Giant Leap
- Annie Lennox (also appeared in London)
- Beverley Knight
- Bob Geldof (also appeared in London)
- Bono (presenter, also appeared with his band U2 at London)
- Campino
- Chris Evans
- Claudia Schiffer (presenter, also appeared in Berlin)
- Coumi Nidu (presenter)
- Davina McCall (presenter)
- Eddie Izzard (presenter, also accompanied Midge Ure)
- Embrace
- Feeder
- Geoffrey Oryema
- George Clooney (presenter)
- Herbert Grönemeyer (also appeared in Berlin)
- James Brown
- Jamie Cullum
- Katherine Jenkins (also appeared in Berlin)
- Lenny Henry (presenter, also appeared in London)
- Maxi Jazz
- Mahotella Queens
- McFly (also appeared in Tokyo)
- Midge Ure
- Natasha Bedingfield
- Nelson Mandela (also appeared in Johannesburg)
- Neneh Cherry
- Peter Kay (presenter, also appeared in London)
- Ronan Keating
- Snow Patrol (also appeared in London)
- Sugababes
- Susan Sarandon (presenter)
- Texas
- The Corrs
- The Proclaimers
- The Thrills
- Travis (also appeared in London)
- Wangari Maathai (presenter)
- Wet Wet Wet
- Will Young

== Johannesburg - Mary Fitzgerald Square ==
- 4Peace Ensemble
- Jabu Khanyile & Bayete
- Lindiwe
- Lucky Dube
- Mahotella Queens
- Malaika
- Nelson Mandela (Host)
- Orchestra Baobab
- Oumou Sangare
- Vusi Mahlasela
- Zola

== London - Hyde Park ==
Performers

- African Children's Choir
- Annie Lennox
- Coldplay
- Dido
- Elton John
- George Michael
- Hunterz & The Dhol Blasters
- Joss Stone
- Keane
- Madonna
- Mariah Carey
- Ms. Dynamite
- Paul McCartney
- Pete Doherty
- Pink Floyd
- R.E.M.
- Razorlight
- Richard Ashcroft
- Robbie Williams
- Scissor Sisters
- Snoop Dogg
- Snow Patrol
- Stereophonics
- Sting
- The Killers
- The Who
- Travis
- U2
- UB40
- Velvet Revolver
- Youssou N'Dour

Presenters included:

- Bill Gates, Birhan Woldu, Bob Geldof, Brad Pitt, David Beckham, David Walliams, Dawn French, Jonathan Ross, Kofi Annan, Lenny Henry, Peter Kay, Matt Lucas and Ricky Gervais.

== Moscow - Red Square ==
- Agata Kristi
- Alyona Sviridova
- Bi-2
- Bravo
- Dolphin
- Garik Sukachev
- Jungo
- Linda
- Moral Code X
- Pet Shop Boys
- Red Elvises
- Splean
- Valery Syutkin

== Paris - Chateau de Versailles ==
- Alpha Blondy
- Amel Bent
- Andrea Bocelli with the Philarmonie der Nationen
- Axelle Red
- Calogero
- Cerrone & Nile Rodgers
- Craig David
- David Hallyday
- Diam's & Amel Bent
- Dido
- Faudel
- Florent Pagny (with Patricia Petitbon)
- Kyo
- Laurent Boyer (presenter)
- Louis Bertignac
- M pokora
- Magic System
- Muse
- Passi
- Placebo
- Raphael
- Shakira
- Solidarite Sida (presenter)
- The Cure
- Tina Arena
- Yannick Noah
- Youssou N'Dour
- Zucchero (also appeared in Rome)

== Philadelphia - Benjamin Franklin Parkway ==
Performers

- Alicia Keys
- Black Eyed Peas
- Black Ice
- Bon Jovi
- Dave Matthews Band
- Def Leppard
- Destiny's Child
- DJ Green Lantern
- DJ Jazzy Jeff
- Eagles
- Jars of Clay
- Jay-Z
- Josh Groban
- Kaiser Chiefs
- Kanye West
- Keith Urban
- Lemon
- Linkin Park
- Maroon 5
- Rita Marley
- Rob Thomas
- Sarah McLachlan
- Stephen Marley
- Stevie Wonder
- Toby Keith
- Will Smith

Presenters included

- Chris Tucker, Dhani Jones, Don Cheadle, Jennifer Connelly, Jimmy Smits, Kami, Naomi Watts, Natalie Portman, Richard Gere & Will Smith (Main Host)

== Rome - Circus Maximus ==
- Alex Britti
- Antonello Venditti
- Articolo 31
- Biagio Antonacci
- Cesare Cremonini
- Claudio Baglioni
- Duran Duran
- Elisa
- Faith Hill
- Fiorella Mannoia
- Francesco De Gregori
- Francesco Renga
- Gemelli Diversi
- Irene Grandi
- Jane Alexander (presenter)
- Jovanotti
- Laura Pausini
- Le Vibrazioni
- Ligabue
- Mayor of Lampedusa (presenter)
- Pagani & African Drum Collective
- Max Pezzali
- Meg
- Negramaro
- Negrita
- Nek
- Noa
- L'Orchestra di Piazza Vittorio
- Paola Cortellesi (presenter)
- Piero Pelù
- Pino Daniele
- Planet Funk
- Povia
- Renato Zero
- Ron
- Spandau Ballet
- Stefano Senardi
- Tim McGraw
- Tiromancino
- Velvet
- Zucchero (also appeared in Paris)
