= Malcolm Hill =

Malcolm Hill may refer to:

- Malcolm Hill (footballer) (born 1938), former Australian rules footballer
- Malcolm Hill (audio engineer), public address system pioneer
- Malcolm Hill (basketball) (born 1995), American professional basketball player
- Malcolm Hill (cyclist) (born 1954), Australian cyclist
