= Philadelphia Freedom =

Philadelphia Freedom may refer to:

- "Philadelphia Freedom" (song), a 1975 number one song by Elton John
- Philadelphia Freedom (soccer), a soccer club that competed in the USISL and the USISL Pro League
- Philadelphia Freedom (album), a 1975 album by MFSB
- Philadelphia Freedom Concert, a 2005 fundraiser headlined by Elton John

== See also ==
- Philadelphia Freedoms, a World TeamTennis franchise
- Philadelphia Freedoms (1974), a defunct World TeamTennis franchise
