= Allocacoc =

Industrial design company

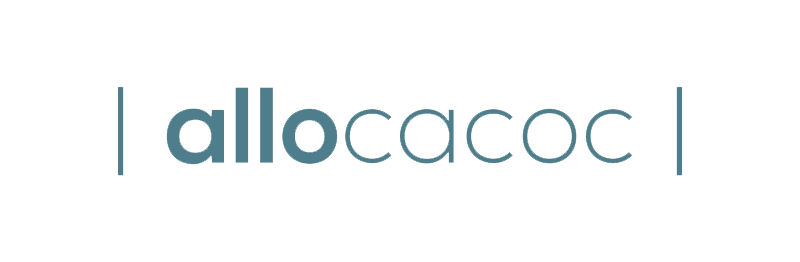
The latest version of Allocacoc logo

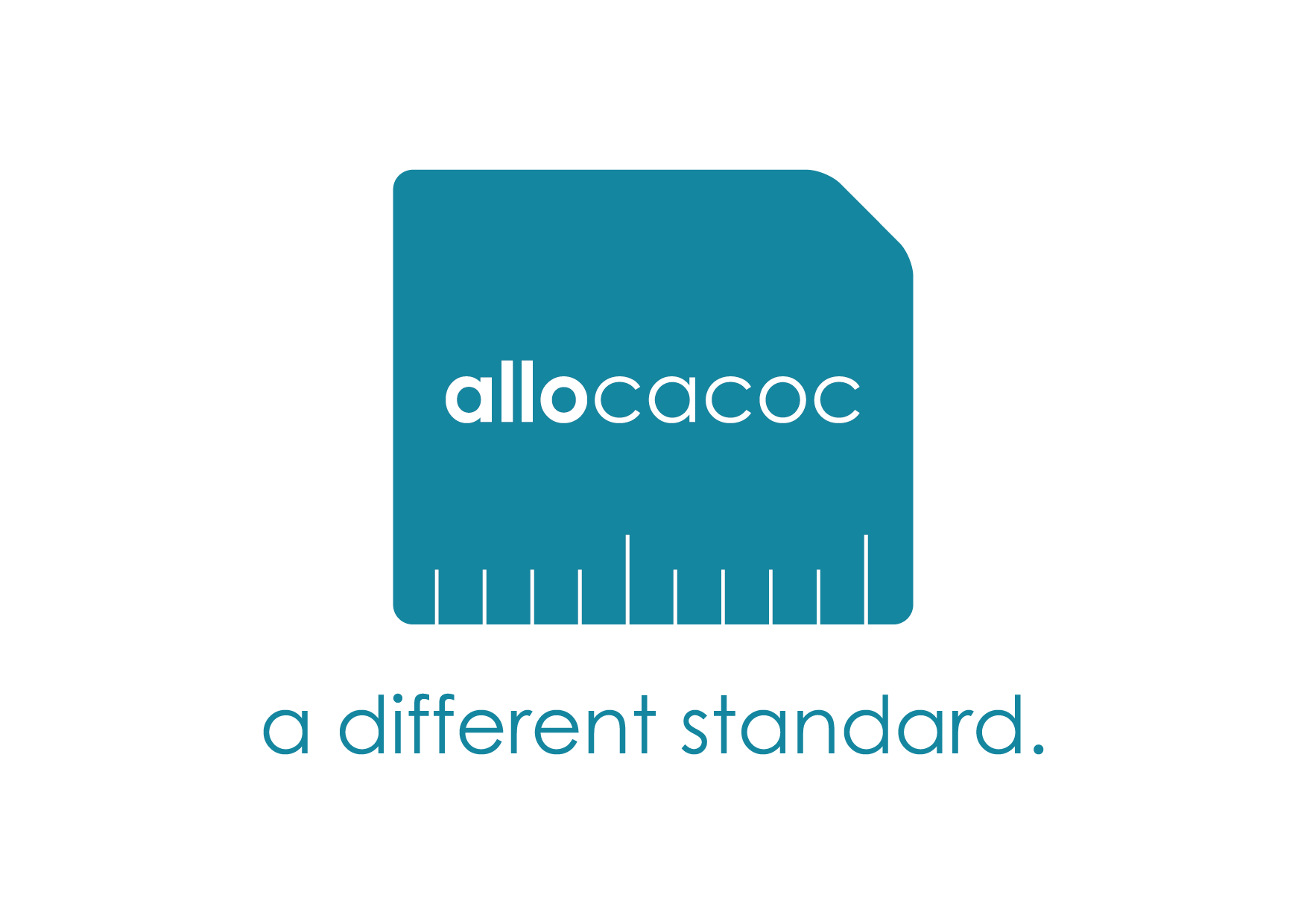
Allocacoc logo

Allocacoc (/əˈloʊkəˌkɒk/ ə-LOH-kə-kok) is an industrial design company established in the Netherlands that sells redesigned everyday products such as the PowerCube. Allocacoc headquartered in Shanghai and has a factory in Suzhou with an R&D center in Shenzhen, China. Its European head office moved from Delft to Breukelen (Utrecht) in August 2018. The company creates innovative products by adding original designs and keeping them affordable. In 2019, Allocacoc decided on a rebranding strategy and focus their business development on DesignNest.com - a consumer product platform of a broad range of design products. DesignNest was originally founded by Allocacoc in 2016 and now aiming to help industrial designers from start to finish, such as funding, design knowledge, sourcing, pricing, production, product assembly, distribution, fighting against copycats and worldwide sales.

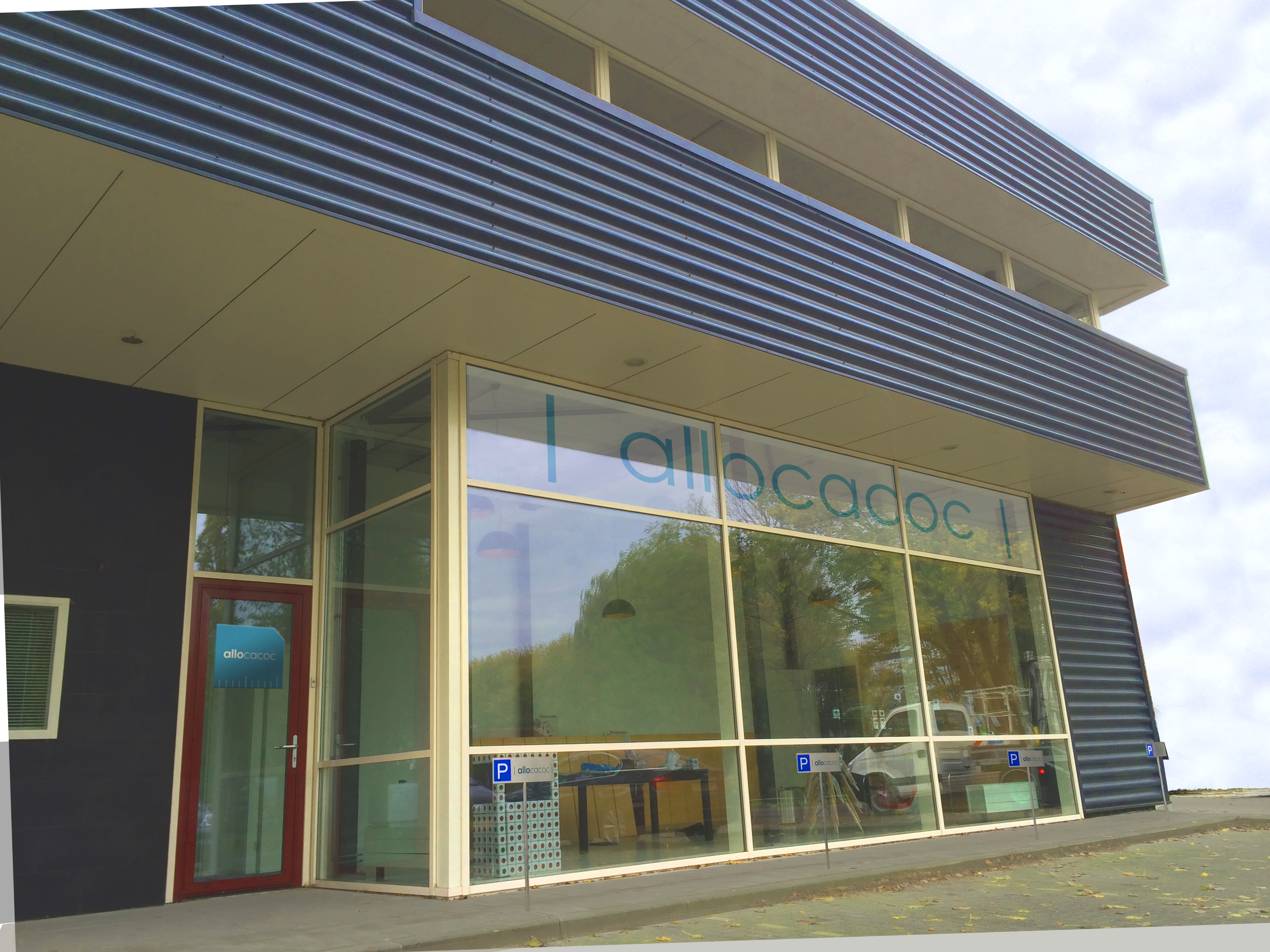
Allocacoc previous Headquarters in Delft

== History ==
Allocacoc was founded by two industrial design engineers, Arthur Limpens and Yixia Jiang from Delft University of Technology, in the Netherlands. Stated by Yixia Jiang in a 2011 interview, the company name was inspired by their favourite drink Coca-Cola.

== Products ==
Allocacoc has a wide range of products, including power strip, socket, lighting, stationery, home gadgets, audio, etc. and it is still expanding.

- PowerCube® Original and USB: A compact power strip with multiple power outlets designed to charge multiple devices and blocking each other.
- PowerCube® Rewirable : A power strip in the shape of a cube with travel adapters.
- DesignNest® Heng Balance Lamp : Winner of the Red Dot Design Award 2016, Heng Balance Lamp is a series of lamps with a “balance” function that reinvents how lamps are switched on.

== Awards ==
The PowerCube was given the Red Dot Design Award for best product design category in 2014.

Computex Design and Innovation Award in 2015
