= Bernard Watson =

American musical artist (born 1967)

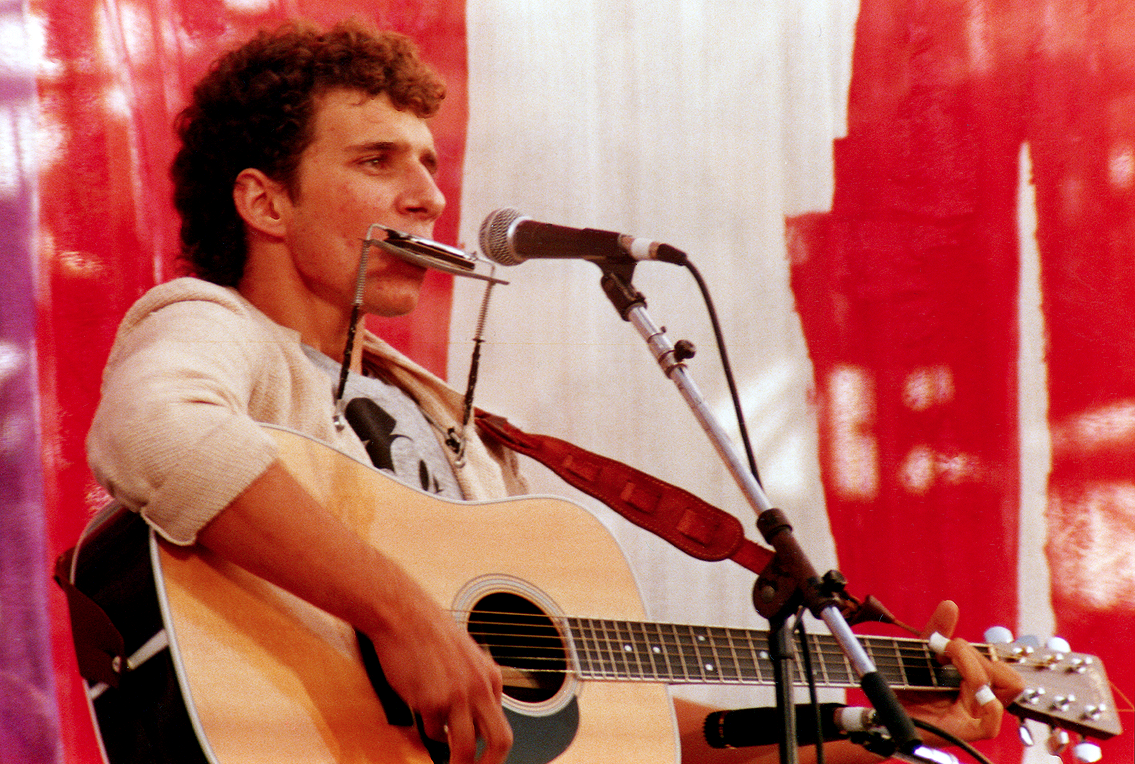
- Watson at Live Aid, Philadelphia, on July 13, 1985

Background information
- Born: David Weinstein; 1967 (age 58–59)
- Origin: Florida, USA

Bernard Watson (born David Weinstein, 1967) is an American singer and guitarist, who was the opening act at the American leg of the Live Aid concert in JFK Stadium, Philadelphia on July 13, 1985.

An 18-year-old from Miami Beach, he had just graduated from high school and had no professional musical experience. After sleeping outside the stadium for a week, he persuaded the concert's producer Bill Graham, in the spirit of charity, to let him perform. Graham relented, and Watson (who took his stage name from Bernard Marx and Helmholz Watson, two characters from Aldous Huxley's "Brave New World") took the stage at 8:51 a.m. (EDT).

Watson sang two songs: Bob Dylan's "All I Really Want To Do" and an original composition called "Interview", accompanying himself on guitar and harmonica.

One of the strings on my guitar broke, then I dropped the pick and that wasn't very professional. But I felt happy that I got a chance. I'd like to make it in this business. It was the dream of a lifetime. That's what it was. — Bernard Watson

Watson's contribution is not on the official DVD set; supposedly the only known copy of the footage is in the possession of Watson himself, although footage of his performance taken from a WPLG news report is available on YouTube. As of 2015, Watson was continuing to write music, but was using his birth name rather than his stage name.
