= Malcolm Hill (designer) =

British speaker designer

Malcolm Hill is a British speaker designer. He has focused on public address systems used at large-scale events.

Since the early 1970s, Hill's design philosophy has been the "Faithful Reproduction of the Original Sound". Throughout the 1980s and 1990s, Hill Speaker Systems were used by many international touring artists. They found use in theatres, arenas, and stadiums around the world, to include Wembley Stadium and Madison Square Garden. In the mid-1990s, under the banner "faith comes through hearing", Hill designed the PowerCube, a compact self-powered speaker.

Hill's M-series speaker systems have been used by many high–profile acts including:

- Gary Numan
- Live Aid
- AC/DC
- Monsters of Rock
- A-Ha
- Status Quo
- Frankie Goes to Hollywood
- The B52's
