= Birhan Woldu =

Ethiopian documentary star

Birhan Woldu (born 1981) is an Ethiopian woman who, as a child during the 1983-1985 Ethiopian famine, appeared in video footage taken while she was starving and close to death. The footage was screened to the audience attending the Live Aid concert in 1985.

Woldu was originally filmed in 1984 by a Canadian Broadcasting Corporation (CBC) documentary crew led by Brian Stewart and Tony Burman. Her family had walked from their village in Tigray to Mek'ele in hopes of finding food or relief. Her sister Azmara died during the trip, and she and her mother both became very ill.

While at the aid centre her father, Woldu Menameno, was told by the attending nuns that Birhan was likely to die within the next 15 minutes. He wrapped her in a white burial shroud and began to dig a grave. However, as he began to bury his daughter, he noticed a faint pulse. He alerted the nurses, who eventually restored her to health.

She subsequently became a symbol of the 1984—1985 Ethiopian famine and a trigger for the global famine relief effort. In 2004, an adult Woldu appeared in Band Aid 20's music video for "Do They Know It's Christmas?". In 2005, Bob Geldof had the film played again at the Live 8 concert in London, then introduced Woldu, who thanked the audience for their support in her native tongue. She remained on stage for the first part of Madonna's performance of "Like a Prayer".

In 2010, Birhan, by then working as a nurse, became engaged to Birhanu Meresa, whom she had met while the two attended an agricultural college in Ethiopia.

On 13 July 2015, Woldu said that the international recognition she received through Live Aid had made it difficult for her to find employment, as her public association with the campaign overshadowed her efforts to establish an independent career. She also called for greater investment in schools, hospitals and employment opportunities in Ethiopia, arguing that long-term infrastructure development would provide more sustainable benefits than food aid alone.

Marking the 40th anniversary of Live Aid, the 2025 BBC and CNN documentary series Live Aid: When Rock 'n' Roll Took on the World includes Birhan Woldu and her father Woldu Menameno in multiple episodes discussing their experiences during the famine and afterwards. Now in her forties, she revealed how painful it is to watch the old footage of her captured by the CBC documentary crew when she was a starving young child.
