= Is This the World We Created...? =

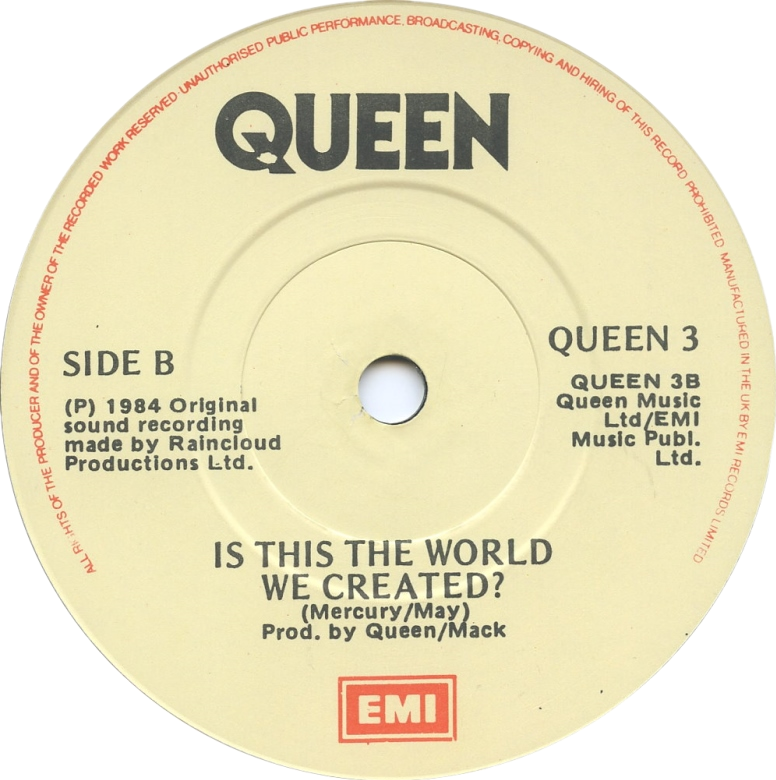
- B-side label of the Ireland vinyl pressing of the "It's a Hard Life" single release

Song by Queen

from the album The Works
- A-side: "It's a Hard Life"
- Published: Queen Music Ltd.
- Released: 16 July 1984
- Recorded: January 1984
- Studio: Musicland, Munich
- Genre: Acoustic rock
- Length: 2:12
- Label: EMI; Capitol
- Songwriters: Freddie Mercury; Brian May
- Producers: Queen; Reinhold Mack

Music video
- "Is This the World We Created...?" (Live at Wembley Stadium, 1986) on YouTube

"Is This the World We Created...?" is a song by the British rock band Queen, which was originally released on their eleventh studio album The Works in 1984.

The song was played at every Queen concert from 1984 to 1986. It was part of the finale at Live Aid in 1985.

== Overview ==
"Is This the World We Created...?" was written in Munich after lead singer Freddie Mercury and guitarist Brian May watched the news of poverty in Africa; Mercury wrote most of the lyrics and May wrote the chords and made small lyrical contributions.

The song was recorded with an Ovation, but, in live performances, May played drummer Roger Taylor's Gibson Chet Atkins CE nylon-stringed guitar. A piano was tracked at the recording sessions for this song, but ultimately not included in the final mix. Originally, a Mercury composition, "There Must Be More to Life Than This" (which was around since the Hot Space sessions and finally ended up on his solo album Mr. Bad Guy) was supposed to be the album's last track. The song was written in the key of B minor, but the recording sounds one semitone lower.

The song was performed at Live Aid as an encore, with additional instruments and arrangements in the last part; changes were also present in the vocal line. A month before their Live Aid appearance, "Is This the World We Created…?" was Queen's contribution to the multi-artist compilation Greenpeace – The Album.

== Personnel ==
- Freddie Mercury – vocals
- Brian May – acoustic guitar

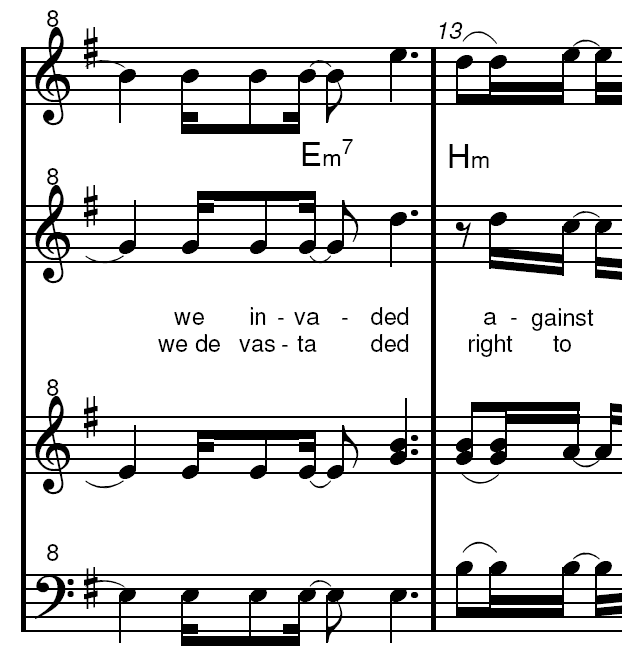
