= Live 8 =

International series of benefit concerts prior to the G8 summit in 2005

- Logo
- Genre: Rock, pop
- Dates: 2 and 6 July 2005; 21 years ago
- Locations: Hyde Park London, England, United Kingdom; Palace of Versailles Versailles, Paris, France; Berlin Victory Column Berlin, Germany; Circus Maximus Rome, Lazio, Italy; Benjamin Franklin Parkway Philadelphia, Pennsylvania, United States, Park Place Barrie, Ontario, Canada; Makuhari Messe Chiba, Japan; Mary Fitzgerald Square Johannesburg, Gauteng, South Africa; Red Square Moscow, Russia; Eden Project Cornwall, England, United Kingdom; Murrayfield Stadium Edinburgh, Scotland, United Kingdom
- Years active: 2005
- Founders: Bob Geldof, Midge Ure
- Website: www.live8live.com

Live 8 (Note: French: En direct 8; German: Live 8; Italian: Vivi 8; Japanese: ライブ8, romanised: Raibu 8; Russian: Прямой эфир 8, romanised: Pryamoy efir 8) was a string of benefit concerts that took place on 2 July 2005, in the G8 states and South Africa. They were timed to precede the G8 conference and summit held at the Gleneagles Hotel in Auchterarder, Scotland, from 6–8 July 2005. Both events also coincided with the 20th anniversary of Live Aid. Run in support of the aims of the UK's Make Poverty History campaign and the Global Call to Action Against Poverty, ten simultaneous concerts were held on 2 July and one on 6 July. On 7 July, the G8 leaders pledged to double 2004 levels of aid to poor nations from US$25 billion to US$50 billion by 2010. Half of the money was to go to Africa. More than 1,000 musicians performed at the concerts, which were broadcast on 182 television networks and 2,000 radio networks. Live 8 was seen by 3 million viewers in the United States according to Nielsen, with an estimated 30 million viewers worldwide. The BBC estimates the global audience to be around 1.5 billion while other estimates place the total audience as high as 2 billion.

Live Aid organiser Bob Geldof announced the event on 31 May. Many former Live Aid acts offered their services to the cause. Prior to the official announcement of the event, many news sources referred to the event as Live Aid 2. However, Geldof and co-organiser Midge Ure have since explicitly said they do not think of the event as the same as Live Aid. On an episode of BBC Two music-based comedy panel show Never Mind the Buzzcocks, which aired on 2 March 2006, The Cribs frontman Ryan Jarman said he had texted Geldof to suggest that a "Live Aid 2" would be a good idea. However, after organising the event, Geldof said: "This is not Live Aid 2. These concerts are the start point for The Long Walk To Justice, the one way we can all make our voices heard in unison." Many of the Live 8 backers were also involved in the largely forgotten NetAid concerts, including Executive Producer Jeff Pollack.

Organisers of Live 8 presented the "Live 8 List" to the world leaders at the Live 8 call that politicians take action to "Make Poverty History". Names from the list also appeared on the giant televisions at each concert during the broadcast.

== Concerts ==
Broadcaster Jonathan Ross opened the European Live 8 concerts with the words: "It's two o'clock in London on July the 2nd 2005. Hyde Park welcomes the world to Live 8."

There were ten concerts held on 2 July 2005, most of them simultaneously. The first to begin was held at the Makuhari Messe in Japan, with Rize being the first of all the Live 8 performers. During the opening of the Philadelphia concert outside the city's Museum of Art, actor Will Smith led the combined audiences of London, Philadelphia, Berlin, Rome, Paris and Barrie in a synchronised finger snap, meant to represent the death of a child every three seconds in Africa.

Bob Geldof hosted the event at Hyde Park in London, England where he also performed "I Don't Like Mondays". Special guests appeared throughout the concerts. Then-Secretary-General of the United Nations Kofi Annan and Microsoft co-founder Bill Gates made speeches at the London show, while former South African President Nelson Mandela addressed the crowd in the Johannesburg venue. Guest presenters, ranging from sports stars to comedians, also introduced acts.

Included in the all-star line-up were Pink Floyd, reunited with former frontman Roger Waters for the first time in over 24 years. With the death of keyboardist Richard Wright in 2008, Live 8 was the final time the band's "classic" lineup performed together. Waters stated the band dedicated "Wish You Were Here" to their absent former member Syd Barrett, who later died in 2006.

The final event called Edinburgh 50,000 – The Final Push was held at Murrayfield Stadium in Edinburgh, Scotland, on 6 July 2005. It featured further performances from some of the artists from the other concerts, and was the closest of the eleven to the actual location of the G8 summit.

== Tickets ==
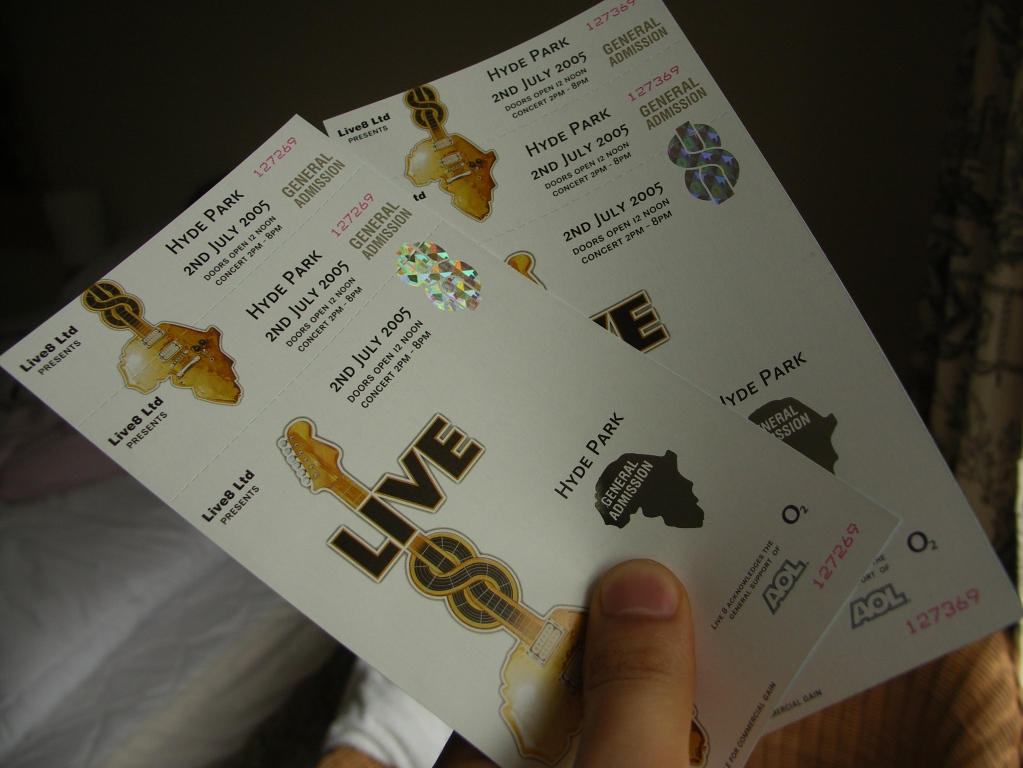
A pair of Live 8 tickets

Although the concerts were free, 66,500 pairs of tickets for the Hyde Park concert were allocated from 13 to 15 June 2005, to winners of a mobile phone text message competition that began on Monday, 6 June 2005. Entry involved sending the answer to a multiple choice question via a text message costing £1.50. Winners were drawn at random from those who correctly answered the question. Over two million messages were sent during the competition, raising £3 million. The first £1.6 million raised was given to the Prince's Trust, which had to cancel its own annual Party in the Park concert in Hyde Park that year to make way for Live 8. According to the Live 8 website, funds raised beyond the £1.6 million "will go to pay for the costs of Live 8, as it is a free event".

Some ticket-winners placed their tickets for sale on internet auction site eBay, and were heavily criticised by the organisers of the event, including Bob Geldof. Initially, eBay defended its decision to allow the auctions to go ahead, stating that there were no laws against the resale of charity concert tickets. The site also offered to make a donation to Live 8 at least equivalent to the fees it would make from the ticket sales. Some people, angered by others seemingly using Live 8 to make money, placed fake bids for millions of pounds for such auctions in an attempt to force the sellers to take them off sale. It was later announced that eBay, under pressure from the British government, the public, as well as Geldof himself, would withdraw all auctions of the tickets.

Similar touting situations arose for the Edinburgh and Canadian shows, and eBay also halted the sales of the tickets.

== Performances ==
=== London ===
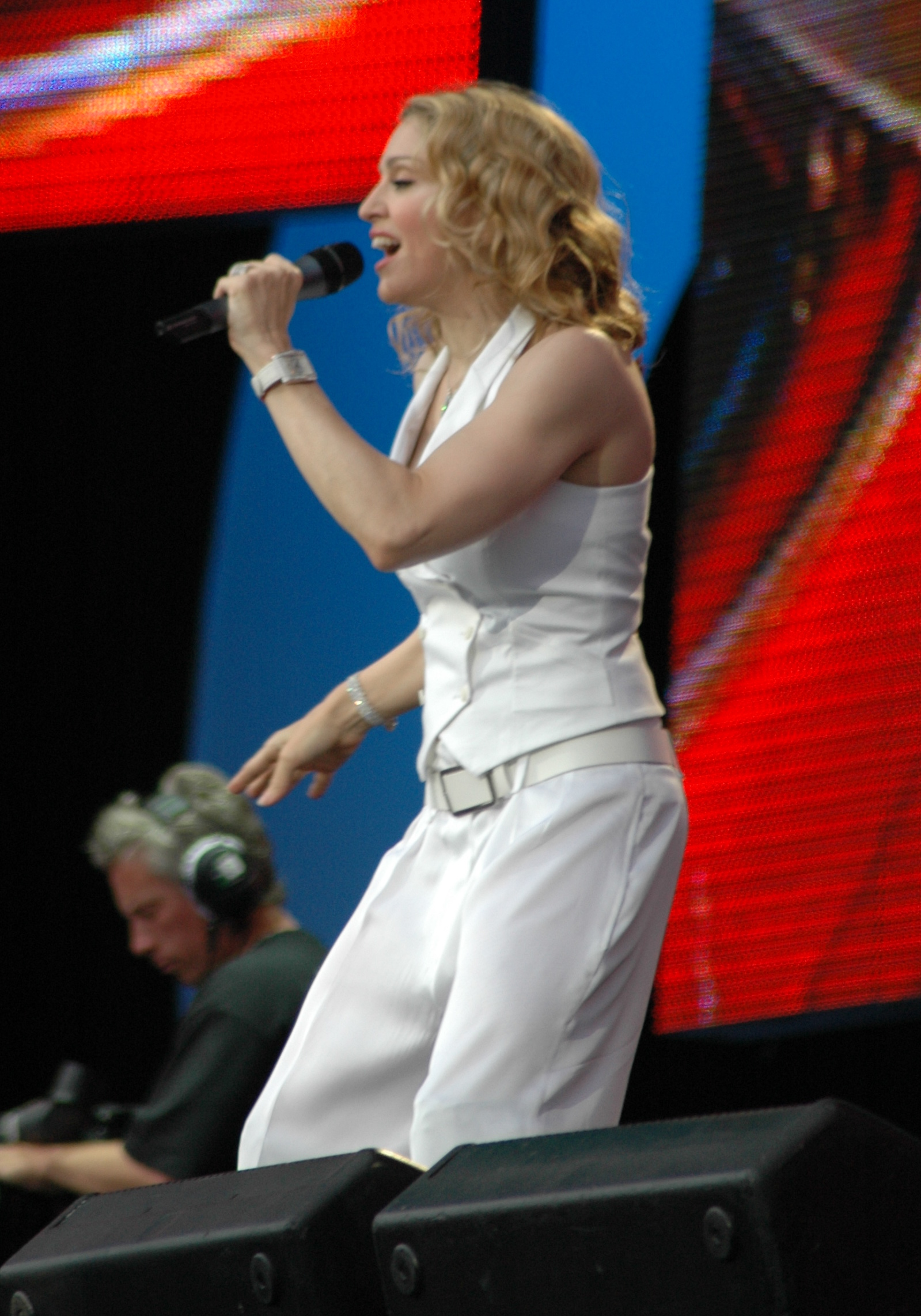
Madonna performing at Live 8

- U2 and Paul McCartney opened the London concert, playing "Sgt. Pepper's Lonely Hearts Club Band". Later, Bono added a couple of lines of The Beatles' "Blackbird" to the end of "Beautiful Day".
- Mariah Carey performed her hit 1993 single "Hero" and "Make It Happen"
- Travis performed singles "Sing", "Side" and "Why Does It Always Rain on Me?".
- Keane performed singles "Somewhere Only We Know" and "Bedshaped".
- The classic quartet line-up of the progressive rock band Pink Floyd (Roger Waters, David Gilmour, Richard Wright and Nick Mason) played together on stage for the first time in 24 years. The band performed the songs "Speak to Me", "Breathe / Breathe (Reprise)", "Money", "Wish You Were Here" and "Comfortably Numb". They were the only band not to be verbally introduced. This was also the final performance by the full classic line-up as Richard Wright died of cancer in 2008.
- Pete Doherty joined Elton John for a version of T. Rex's hit "Children of the Revolution".
- Using much of the musical equipment used by rock band Travis, who had just left the stage, Bob Geldof decided on the "spur of the moment" to perform the Boomtown Rats' hit "I Don't Like Mondays".
- Before Madonna's set, Geldof introduced Birhan Woldu, who was the starving child in the CBC News report which prompted Geldof to organise Live Aid. She held hands with Madonna while the singer performed the first verses of "Like a Prayer".
- Chris Martin included the chorus of Status Quo's song "Rockin' All Over the World" in the bridge of Coldplay's song "In My Place". Status Quo had opened the 1985 Wembley Live Aid concert with that song. In addition, Coldplay were joined by Richard Ashcroft to perform "Bitter Sweet Symphony".
- Robbie Williams began with a cover of Queen's "We Will Rock You". Williams stated in an interview that he "wanted to bring a bit of Freddie back from the original Live Aid". Williams had often performed the same section of "We Will Rock You" during his own concerts.

=== Philadelphia ===
- Kaiser Chiefs opened the show with "I Predict a Riot", "Everyday I Love You Less And Less", and "Oh My God".
- Kanye West performed a three-song set with a twenty-five piece string orchestra, opening with a live debut of his lead single for his then forthcoming album Late Registration. Will Smith and DJ Jazzy Jeff can be seen briefly dancing off stage.
- Will Smith led the crowd in a sing-along to the theme song of "The Fresh Prince of Bel-Air".
- Jay-Z and Linkin Park joined forces to sing their mash-up song "Numb/Encore"
- Mayor John Street announced on stage that there were over 1 million spectators in the audience.
- Closing act Stevie Wonder was joined on stage by Matchbox Twenty front man Rob Thomas and Maroon 5 lead singer Adam Levine. Thomas dueted with him on "Higher Ground" and Levine on "Signed, Sealed, Delivered, I'm Yours". During Wonder's performance, American Idol judge Paula Abdul can be seen dancing off stage right.

=== Barrie, Canada ===
Deep Purple made an appearance and performed "Highway Star", "Smoke on the Water" and "Hush". DMC (of Run-DMC) performed with Keith Denehy of Angry Hill, Elliot Easton of The Cars, and Joey Kramer and Tom Hamilton of Aerosmith. The Tragically Hip played a set, just before Neil Young finished off Live 8 in Barrie with "4 Strong Winds", "Rockin' in the Free World" and "O Canada".

=== Berlin ===
Some of the highlights of the Berlin show included Brian Wilson who played a set with his band, doing "Our Prayer"/"Gee", "God Only Knows", "California Girls", "Good Vibrations", and "Fun Fun Fun", as well as Green Day, having released their political rock opera "American Idiot" the previous year.

=== Moscow ===
Agatha Christie, Bi-2, Jango, Dolphin, Linda, Moral Code X, Red Elvises, Splean, Pet Shop Boys

== Separate rally and anti-poverty protest in Edinburgh ==
On 2 July, the same day as the Live 8 concerts, a rally and protest march was held in central Edinburgh, the nearest major city to the Gleneagles venue, for the G8 conference later that week. This protest was organised by the Make Poverty History coalition as part of a series of events ahead of the G8 conference, and had already been planned before the announcement of Live 8.

An estimated 225,000 people took part, making it the largest-ever protest in Scotland and the largest ever anti-poverty protest in the UK.

== Notable absences ==
In the weeks leading up to Live 8, British newspaper Daily Mirror began a petition, garnering support for British rock band Status Quo to play at the event. Originally offered a 6pm slot, the band already had commitments in Ireland and therefore requested an earlier slot. Their request was rejected by the organisers as there were no available slots.

There were speculations by the press that English girl group the Spice Girls would reunite for a Live 8 performance, in what would have been their first appearance as a five-piece since May 1998. At the Live 8 launch in May, Bob Geldof confirmed that organisers were trying to get the group to re-form for the event. Ultimately, the Live 8 reunion did not materialise due to a holdout by Spice Girl Mel B. During the Hyde Park concert, British comedian Peter Kay jokingly introduced the Spice Girls while he was introducing The Who.

English rock band Oasis also declined to participate in the concerts as they were performing at the City of Manchester Stadium the same evening and the day after. Noel Gallagher later expressed disapproval that musicians were expected to rally at the convenience of Geldof. Gallagher was also vocally sceptical about the impact of Live 8, citing his belief that rock stars did not have as much influence over world leaders as the Live 8 organisers may believe.

English rock band Radiohead also turned down an offer to play at the event.

== Criticism ==
=== Lack of racially diverse performers ===
The original lineup for the Hyde Park concert faced criticism for having only one non-white artist – Mariah Carey. Blur and Gorillaz frontman Damon Albarn called the lack of black performers the organisers' "greatest oversight", while Senegalese musician Baaba Maal wrote in The Independent: "I do feel it's very patronising as an African artist that more of us aren't involved."

Live 8 organisers subsequently added British R&B singer Ms. Dynamite, US rapper Snoop Dogg and Senegalese singer Youssou N'Dour to the Hyde Park lineup in response to the criticism. N'Dour was the only major African artist scheduled to perform at any of the five main concerts. A Live 8 spokesman said that a number of black performers had been approached but were not available to participate and that the event would nonetheless feature a "large urban element". Organisers also argued that there were few black British artists who could attract a large global audience, stating that Geldof's intention was to aim for the biggest global stars to ensure media attention and a large television audience. A Live 8 concert in Johannesburg and an "Africa Calling" concert featuring an entirely African lineup at the Eden Project in Cornwall, were organised following the criticisms.

=== Motives and controversy ===
Geldof's motives for organising Live 8 were questioned. TV and radio presenter Andy Kershaw - who had co-presented Live Aid in 1985 - directed criticisms at Geldof and the motives for Live 8, saying: "I am coming, reluctantly, to the conclusion that Live 8 is as much to do with Geldof showing off his ability to push around presidents and prime ministers as with pointing out the potential of Africa. Indeed, Geldof appears not to be interested in Africa's strengths, only in an Africa on its knees." Rashod Ollison of The Baltimore Sun echoed Kershaw's criticisms, calling the event a "ravenous orgy of celebrity ego trips". Geldof's approach, of pressuring G8 leaders to improve aid, forgive debt and ease trade restrictions in Africa, was questioned by John O'Shea, chief executive of international aid charity Goal. O'Shea was concerned that "Live 8 overlooked the need to tackle Africa's corrupt regimes and establish a UN peacekeeping army in Darfur, the Congo and northern Uganda."

The organisers were criticised for using Africa to revive the careers of ageing rock stars more than about helping the poor in Africa. The lineup for the Canada Live 8 concert in particular, was criticised for being "out of touch" and filled with "musical has-beens".

For the Edinburgh concert, Geldof called for children to "give up home and school for a week" to join supporters in a march (entitled The Long Walk to Justice) on 6 July, the start of the G8 summit, which drew the ire of teachers and local residents. Furthermore, the Live 8 concert's timing coincided with the long planned Make Poverty History march in Edinburgh.

Damon Albarn suggested that the performers should put pressure on their record labels to pay "some kind of tariff" from the increased record sales that would come from playing at the event, so as to "genuinely show this is an altruistic act and that there is no self-gain in it". Pink Floyd's guitarist David Gilmour announced that he would donate the profits from the increased sales in Pink Floyd's Echoes album to charity, stating: "Though the main objective has been to raise consciousness and put pressure on the G8 leaders, I will not profit from the concert. This is money that should be used to save lives."

Criticism was levelled at the Philadelphia Live 8 concert, when it was revealed that while the performers received no monetary compensation for their participation, they were given gift bags containing designer gifts worth about $12,000. The gifts included $2,000 Gibson guitars, $3,500 Hugo Boss suits and $6,000 Bertolucci watches.

=== Uncensored broadcasts ===
Despite the show being broadcast before the watershed in the United Kingdom, there was no attempt at censorship by the BBC. The network came under fire for its coverage of the Live 8 concerts due to the amount of live swearing by several performers that was broadcast before the watershed. Madonna, Snoop Dogg, Razorlight, Green Day, U2 and Velvet Revolver were also criticised for their use of foul language during their performances. An investigation by the UK media regulator Ofcom ruled that television audiences were subjected to "the most offensive language" and demanded that the BBC issue an on-air apology.

In the United States, ABC drew criticism from the Parents Television Council when its delayed airing of the Hyde Park concert highlights failed to censor The Who's performance of "Who Are You" which contained the lyric, "Who the fuck are you?". ABC responded: "Unfortunately, one inappropriate phrase sung by one performer was initially missed and made it into the East Coast network feed. It was subsequently edited out of the West Coast feed."

=== Other ===
MTV and VH1 were criticised for their coverage of the Live 8 concerts. Media critics and viewers complained that the networks focused too little on the actual musical performances, pointing to the frequent switching between artists and concerts, and cutting to commercials, interviews or "educational segments" while bands were still performing. The VJs also received criticism for frequently talking over the performances. The following weekend, MTV and VH1 re-aired ten commercial-free hours of music performances from the Live 8 concerts in response to the criticism.

The London concert also received criticism when alcohol was outlawed for concertgoers, but made available for the VIPs.

== Release ==
An official Live 8 DVD set was released on 7 November 2005 internationally and 8 November 2005 in the United States.

The 115-track live album compiling tracks from several performances was released on 28 May 2019.

== Legacy ==
On 2 July 2006, BBC One, CTV and MTV broadcast Live 8: What a Difference a Day Makes. In the UK, the special was 60 minutes as compared to the U.S. version on MTV, which was 90 minutes long. The special was aired on MTV at 07:30 Eastern time, giving nearly no chance for viewers to be made aware of the broadcast. Instead of airing the special late at night, MTV aired their normal broadcasting schedule for Sundays, again adding to the criticism of MTV's lack of interest in Live 8.

The Live 8 on AOL worldwide multi-feed webcast by America Online won the first Emmy Award for content delivered via the Internet, cellphones, and iPods ("Broadband award"). Live 8 on AOL was chosen as the winner out of 74 entrants.

In a report issued in June 2006, the G8 have reportedly not lived up to their promises set in 2005. According to DATA, the US, U.K., Italy, and France increased their development-assistance pledges and actual aid to Africa in 2005, but Germany maintained its former level of contribution and Canada decreased aid in 2005. In general, the G8 is moving slowly in the effort to meet its promises.

Some consider Live 8 to be a success, including Bob Geldof himself. However, others including the World Socialist Web Site dismissed Live 8 as a "public relations stunt" for G8 leaders and multinational corporations, due to the disparity between the rhetoric of the events and the actual efforts made after the events in reducing poverty. Geldof also believes that public attention was quickly diverted by the London bombings on 7 July 2005, the day after Live 8 Edinburgh which was the final concert in the series.

== Home video ==
=== Weekly charts ===
Chart performance for Live 8
Chart (2005–2006)	Peak position
Austrian Music DVD (Ö3 Austria)ERROR in "AustriaMV": Invalid date format. Expected: DD-MM-YYYY.	1
Danish Music DVD (Hitlisten)	1
New Zealand Music DVD (RMNZ)	1
Norwegian Music DVD (VG-lista)	2
Portuguese Music DVD (AFP)	1
Spanish Music DVD (PROMUSICAE)	2
Swedish Music DVD (Sverigetopplistan)	2

=== Certifications ===
Certifications for Live 8
Region	Certification	Certified units/sales
Australia (ARIA) Australian compilation	Platinum	15,000^{^}
Canada (Music Canada) Live 8 – Barrie/Toronto	5× Platinum	50,000^{^}
Canada (Music Canada) Live 8 – International	2× Diamond	200,000^{^}
Denmark (IFPI Danmark) Live 8 – International	Platinum	40,000^{^}
France (SNEP) Live 8 – International	Gold	10,000^{*}
France (SNEP) Live 8 – Paris	Platinum	20,000^{*}
Germany (BVMI) Live 8 – International	Platinum	50,000^{^}
Ireland (IRMA) Live 8 – Rome	2× Platinum	8,000^{^}
New Zealand (RMNZ) Live 8 – International	2× Platinum	10,000^{^}
Portugal (AFP) Live 8 – International	Platinum	8,000^{^}
Spain (Promusicae) Live 8 – International	Gold	10,000^{^}
Switzerland (IFPI Switzerland) Live 8 – International	Platinum	6,000^{^}
United Kingdom (BPI) Live 8 – International	3× Platinum	150,000^{*}
United States (RIAA) Live 8 – International	9× Platinum	900,000^{^}
^{*} Sales figures based on certification alone.^{^} Shipments figures based on certification alone.

== See also ==
- G8
- List of highest-grossing benefit concerts
- List of historic rock festivals
- List of Live 8 artists
- Live Aid
- Live Earth
- Philadelphia Freedom Concert
