= PowerCube =

Multiple electrical socket adaptor

The PowerCube is a multiple electrical socket adaptor manufactured by the Allocacoc Corporation in Shanghai, China. Unlike a conventional power strip, the device is arranged like a cube, which can solve the problem of multiple AC adapters fighting for space.

== History ==
The PowerCube was created by two graduates of industrial design engineering at the Delft University of Technology (TU Delft) in the Netherlands. They noticed that people had problems using conventional multi-socket adaptors and started a company, Allocacoc in 2011, to produce an alternative.

== Features ==
The PowerCube is a cubic shaped power socket equipped with multiple sockets. This allows differently shaped AC adapters to be plugged in next to each other, which is not necessarily possible on a conventional powerboard due to shape and geometry. A typical scenario may be a laptop, a tablet computer and multiple smartphones charging simultaneously. The device is available in several different modules, including an optional extension cord and USB outlet, and catering for the target country's appropriate power supply.

Several magazines criticised the PowerCube for its lack of a suitable surge protection, noting that the device has been manufactured solely for convenience. This issue has been addressed and surge protection is now offered in the PowerCube Range, 2016.

== Awards ==
The PowerCube has won several awards:

- The PowerExtension was in the MKB Innovation top 100 at the fifth place in 2014.
- Red Dot Design Award 2014
- GIO acknowledgment for good industrial design 2015
- CITE (China Information Technology Expo) award 2015
