= Live Aid =

1985 benefit concert

- Official Live Aid poster featuring artwork by Peter Blake
- Genre: Rock, pop
- Dates: 13 July 1985 (41 years ago)
- Locations: Wembley Stadium London, England, UK; John F. Kennedy Stadium Philadelphia, Pennsylvania, US
- Founders: Bob Geldof; Midge Ure
- Attendance: 72,000 (London); 89,484 (Philadelphia)

Live Aid was a two-venue benefit concert and music-based fund-raising initiative held on Saturday, 13 July 1985. The event was organised by Bob Geldof and Midge Ure to raise further funds for relief of the 1983–1985 famine in Ethiopia, a movement that started with the release of the successful charity single "Do They Know It's Christmas?" in December 1984. Billed as the "global jukebox", Live Aid was held simultaneously at Wembley Stadium in London and John F. Kennedy Stadium in Philadelphia.

On the same day, concerts inspired by the initiative were held in other countries, such as the Soviet Union, Canada, Japan, Yugoslavia, Austria, Australia, and West Germany. It was one of the largest satellite link-ups and television broadcasts of all time. An estimated audience of 1.9 billion people in 150 nations watched the live broadcast, nearly 40 percent of the world population.

The impact of Live Aid on famine relief has been debated for years. One aid relief worker stated that following the publicity generated by the concert, "humanitarian concern is now at the centre of foreign policy" for Western governments. Geldof has said: "We took an issue that was nowhere on the political agenda and, through the lingua franca of the planet – which is not English but rock 'n' roll – we were able to address the intellectual absurdity and the moral repulsion of people dying of want in a world of surplus." In another interview he stated that Live Aid "created something permanent and self-sustaining" but also asked why Africa was getting poorer.

The organisers of Live Aid tried to run aid efforts directly, channelling millions of pounds to NGOs in Ethiopia. It has been alleged that much of this went to the Ethiopian government of Mengistu Haile Mariam – a regime the UK prime minister Margaret Thatcher opposed – and it is also alleged some funds were spent on guns. Although the BBC World Service programme Assignment reported in March 2010 that the funds had been diverted, the BBC Editorial Complaints Unit later found "that there was no evidence to support such statements". Brian Barder, British Ambassador to Ethiopia from 1982 to 1986, wrote on his website: "The programme itself, and in particular the BBC's advance publicity for it, gave the impression that these allegations concerned not only the aid operation in TPLF [rebel]-controlled areas but also the much larger international relief aid operation in the rest of Ethiopia, including in particular money for famine relief raised by Bob Geldof's Band Aid and Live Aid. This impression is entirely false. Nothing of the sort occurred."

== Background ==
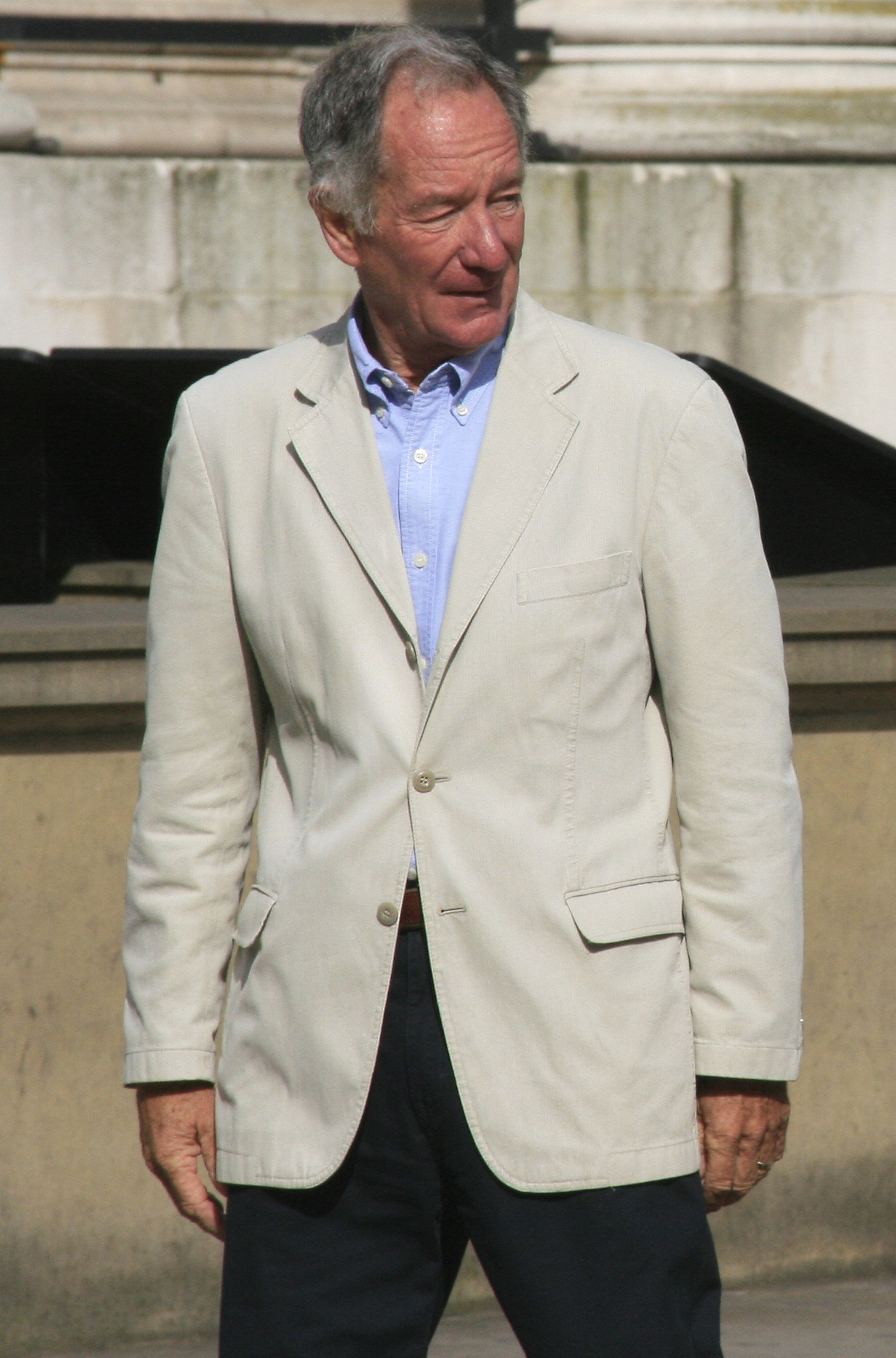
The reports of Michael Buerk (pictured in 2012) on the 1983–1985 famine in Ethiopia for BBC World Service helped spark the aid relief movement.

The 1985 Live Aid concert was conceived as a follow-on to the successful charity single "Do They Know It's Christmas?" which was also the idea of Geldof and Ure. In October 1984, images of hundreds of thousands of people starving to death in Ethiopia were shown in the UK in Michael Buerk's BBC News reports on the 1984 famine. The BBC News crew were the first to document the famine, with Buerk's report on 23 October describing it as "a biblical famine in the 20th century" and "the closest thing to hell on Earth". The reports featured a young nurse, Claire Bertschinger, who, surrounded by 85,000 starving people, told of her sorrow of having to decide which children would be allowed access to the limited food supplies in the feeding station and which were too sick to be saved. She would put a little mark on the children who got chosen, with Geldof stating of her at the time: "In her was vested the power of life and death. She had become God-like and that is unbearable for anyone." Traumatised by what she experienced she did not speak about it for two decades, recalling in 2005: "I felt like a Nazi sending people to the death camps. Why was I in this situation? Why was it possible in this time of plenty that some have food and some do not? It is not right."

"There are thousands of people outside. I have counted 10 rows, and each row has more than 100 people in, and I can only take 60–70 children today, but they all need to come in."

— 1984 diary entry from nurse Claire Bertschinger outside a feeding station.

Shocked by the report, the British public inundated relief agencies, such as Save the Children, with donations, with the report also bringing the world's attention to the crisis in Ethiopia. Such was the magnitude of Buerk's report it was also broadcast in its entirety on a major US news channel – almost unheard of at the time. From his home in London, Geldof too saw the report; he called Ure, the Ultravox frontman (Geldof and Ure had previously worked together for charity when they appeared at the 1981 benefit show The Secret Policeman's Ball in London), and together they quickly co-wrote the song "Do They Know It's Christmas?" in the hope of raising money for famine relief. Geldof then contacted colleagues in the music industry and persuaded them to record the single under the name Band Aid for nothing. On 25 November 1984, the song was recorded at Sarm West Studios in Notting Hill, London, and was released four days later. It stayed at number one for five weeks in the UK, was Christmas number one, and became the fastest-selling single ever in Britain and raised £8 million, rather than the £70,000 Geldof and Ure had initially expected. Geldof then set his sights on staging a huge concert to raise further funds.

The idea to stage a charity concert to raise more funds for Ethiopia originally came from Boy George, the lead singer of Culture Club. George and Culture Club drummer Jon Moss had taken part in the recording of "Do They Know It's Christmas?" and in the same month, the band were undertaking a tour of the UK, which culminated in six nights at Wembley Arena. On the final night at Wembley, 22 December 1984, an impromptu gathering of some of the other artists from Band Aid joined Culture Club on stage at the end of the concert for an encore of "Do They Know It's Christmas?" George was so overcome by the occasion, he told Geldof that they should consider organising a benefit concert. Speaking to the UK music magazine Melody Maker at the beginning of January 1985, Geldof revealed his enthusiasm for George's idea, saying: "If George is organising it, you can tell him he can call me at any time, and I'll do it. It's a logical progression from the record, but the point is you don't just talk about it, you go ahead and do it!"

It was clear from the interview that Geldof had already had the ideas to hold a dual-venue concert and of how the concerts should be structured:

The show should be as big as is humanly possible. There's no point [in] just 5,000 fans turning up at Wembley; we need to have Wembley linked with Madison Square Gardens, and the whole show to be televised worldwide. It would be great for Duran to play three or four numbers at Wembley and then flick to Madison Square, where Springsteen would be playing. While he's on, the Wembley stage could be made ready for the next British act like the Thompsons or whoever. In that way, lots of acts could be featured, and the television rights, tickets, and so on could raise a phenomenal amount of money. It's not an impossible idea, and certainly one worth exploiting.

Live Aid production manager Andy Zweck said: "Bob [Geldof] had to play some tricks to get artists involved. He had to call Elton and say Queen are in and Bowie's in, and of course they weren't. Then he'd call Bowie and say Elton and Queen are in. It was a game of bluff."

== Organisation ==
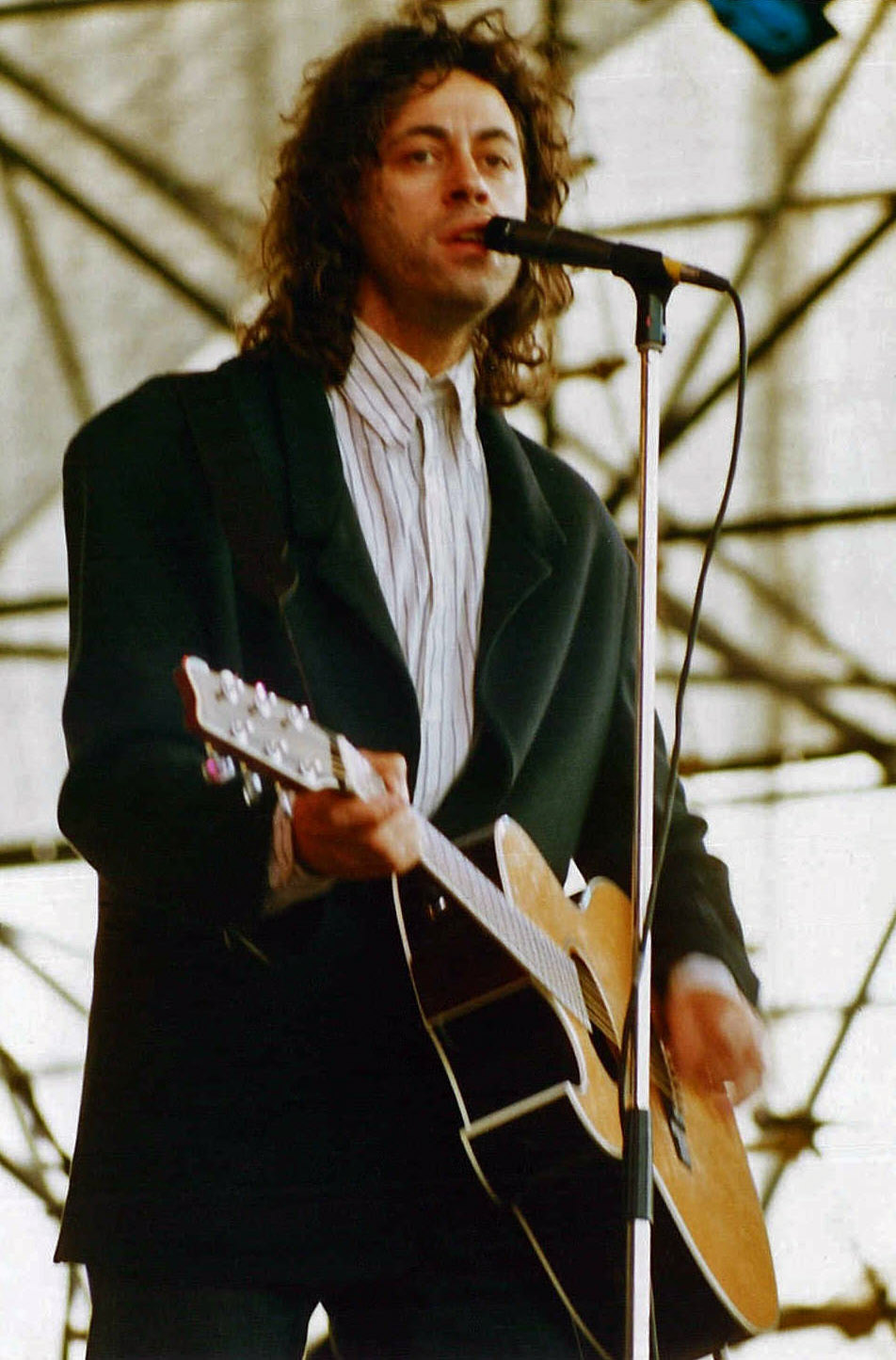
Bob Geldof (pictured in 1987) successfully pitched the idea of the Live Aid concert to promoter Harvey Goldsmith

Among those involved in organising Live Aid were Harvey Goldsmith, who was responsible for the Wembley Stadium concert, and Michael C. Mitchell, who put together the American leg. On promoting the event, Goldsmith stated: "I didn't really get a chance to say no. Bob [Geldof] arrived in my office and basically said: 'We're doing this.' It started from there."

The concert grew in scope as more acts were added on both sides of the Atlantic. Tony Verna, one of the inventors of instant replay, was able to secure John F. Kennedy Stadium through his friendship with Philadelphia mayor Wilson Goode and was able to procure, through his connections with ABC's prime time chief, John Hamlin, a three-hour prime time slot on the ABC Network and, in addition, was able to supplement the lengthy programme through meetings that resulted in the addition of an ad-hoc network within the US, which covered 85 per cent of TVs there. Verna designed the needed satellite schematic and became the executive director as well as the co-executive producer alongside Hal Uplinger. Uplinger, the co-inventor of instant replay, came up with the idea to produce a four-hour video edit of Live Aid to distribute to those countries without the necessary satellite equipment to rebroadcast the live feed.

== Collaborative effort ==
The concert began at noon British Summer Time (BST) (7:00 Eastern Daylight Time (EDT)) at Wembley Stadium in the United Kingdom. It continued at John F. Kennedy Stadium (JFK) in the United States, starting at 13:51 BST (8:51 EDT). The UK's Wembley performances ended at 22:00 BST (17:00 EDT). The JFK performances and the whole concert in the US ended at 04:05 BST on 14 July (23:05 EDT). Thus, the concert continued for just over 16 hours, but since many artists' performances were conducted simultaneously in Wembley and JFK, the total concert length was just over 24 hours.

Mick Jagger and David Bowie intended to perform a transatlantic duet, with Bowie in London and Jagger in Philadelphia. Problems of synchronisation meant the only practical solution was to have one artist, likely Bowie at Wembley, mime along to prerecorded vocals broadcast as part of the live sound mix for Jagger's performance from Philadelphia. Veteran music engineer David Richards (Pink Floyd and Queen) was brought in to create footage and sound mixes Jagger and Bowie could perform to in their respective venues. The BBC would then have had to ensure those footage and sound mixes were in sync while also performing a live vision mix of the footage from both venues. The combined footage would then have had to be bounced back by satellite to the various broadcasters worldwide. Due to the time lag (the signal would take several seconds to be broadcast twice across the Atlantic Ocean), Richards concluded there was no way for Jagger to hear or see Bowie's performance, meaning there could be no interaction between the artists, essentially defeating the whole point of the exercise. On top of this, both artists objected to miming during what was perceived as a historic event. Instead, Jagger and Bowie worked with Richards to create a video of the song they would have performed, a cover of "Dancing in the Street", which was shown on the screens of both stadiums and broadcast as part of many television networks' coverage.

Each of the two main parts of the concert ended with their particular continental all-star anti-hunger anthems, with Band Aid's "Do They Know It's Christmas?" closing the UK concert, and USA for Africa's "We Are the World" closing the US concert (and thus the entire event itself).

Concert organisers have subsequently said they were particularly keen to ensure at least one surviving member of the Beatles, ideally Paul McCartney, took part in the concert as they felt that having an "elder statesman" from British music would give it greater legitimacy in the eyes of the political leaders whose opinions the performers were trying to shape. McCartney agreed to perform and has said it was "the management" – his children – who persuaded him to take part. In the event, he was the last performer (aside from the Band Aid finale) to take to the stage and one of the few to be beset by technical difficulties; his microphone failed for the first two minutes of his piano performance of "Let It Be", making it difficult for television viewers and impossible for those in the stadium to hear him. He later joked by saying he had thought about changing the lyrics to "There will be some feedback, let it be".

Phil Collins performed at both Wembley Stadium and JFK, travelling from Wembley by helicopter (piloted by UK television personality Noel Edmonds) to London Heathrow Airport, then took a British Airways Concorde flight to New York City, before taking another helicopter to Philadelphia. As well as his own set at both venues, he also played the piano for Sting in London, then drums for Eric Clapton, and played with the reuniting surviving members of Led Zeppelin at JFK. On the Concorde flight, Collins encountered actress and singer Cher and told her about the concerts. Upon reaching the US, she attended the Philadelphia concert and can be seen performing as part of the concert's "We Are the World" finale. In a 1985 interview, singer-songwriter Billy Joel stated that he had considered performing at the event, but ultimately chose not to because he had difficulties getting his band together and did not want to perform by himself.

== Broadcasts ==
Broadcaster Richard Skinner opened the Live Aid concert with the words:

It's twelve noon in London, seven AM in Philadelphia, and around the world it's time for Live Aid.

The concert was the most ambitious international satellite television venture that had ever been attempted at the time. In Europe, the television feed was supplied by the BBC via the EBU; its broadcast was presented by Richard Skinner, Andy Kershaw, Mark Ellen, David Hepworth, Andy Batten-Foster, Steve Blacknell, Paul Gambaccini, Janice Long and Mike Smith and included numerous interviews and chats among the various acts. The BBC's television sound feed was mono, as was all UK television audio before NICAM was introduced, but the BBC Radio 1 feed was stereo and was simulcast in sync with the television pictures. Unfortunately, in the rush to set up the transatlantic feeds, the sound feed from Philadelphia was sent to London via transatlantic cable, while the video feed was via satellite, which meant a lack of synchronisation on British television receivers. Due to the constant activities in both London and Philadelphia, the BBC producers broadcast only two songs from the reunion of Crosby, Stills, Nash & Young after 10 pm; the same applied to Rick Springfield and REO Speedwagon. BBC broadcast only one song from the Black Sabbath set, around 3 am. Ashford & Simpson's "Solid" was not broadcast on the BBC. The BBC, however, did supply a "clean feed" to various television channels in Europe.

ABC was largely responsible for the US broadcast (although ABC themselves telecast only the final three hours of the concert from Philadelphia, hosted by Dick Clark, with the rest shown in syndication through Orbis Communications, acting on behalf of ABC). An entirely separate and simultaneous US feed was provided for cable viewers by MTV; its broadcast was presented in stereo and accessible as such for those with stereo televisions. At the time, before multichannel television sound was enacted nationwide, very few televisions reproduced stereo signals, and few television stations were able to broadcast in stereo. While the telecast was run advertisement-free by the BBC, both the MTV and syndicated/ABC broadcasts included advertisements and interviews. As a result, many songs were omitted due to the commercial breaks, as these songs were played during these slots.

The biggest issue of the syndicated/ABC coverage was that the network had wanted to reserve some of the biggest acts that had played earlier in the day for certain points in the entire broadcast, particularly in the final three hours in prime time; thus, Orbis Communications had some sequences replaced by others, especially those portions of the concert that had acts from London and Philadelphia playing simultaneously. For example, while the London/Wembley finale was taking place at 22:00 (10:00 pm) London time, syndicated viewers saw segments that had been recorded earlier so that ABC could show the UK finale during its prime-time portion. In 1995, VH1 and MuchMusic aired a re-edited ten-hour re-broadcast of the concert for its 10th anniversary.

The Live Aid concert in London was also the first time that the BBC outside broadcast sound equipment had been used for an event of such scale. In stark contrast to the mirrored sound systems commonly used by the rock band touring engineers, with two 40–48-channel mixing consoles at the front of house and another pair for monitors, the BBC sound engineers had to use multiple 12-channel desks. Some credit this as the point where the mainstream entertainment industry realised that the rock concert industry had overtaken them in technical expertise.

== Stages and locations ==
=== Wembley Stadium ===
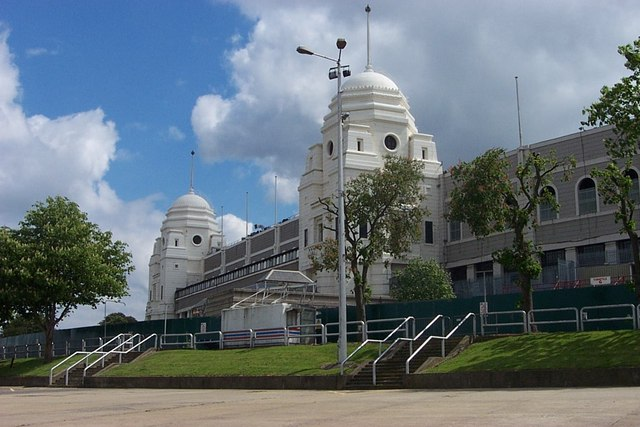
The old Wembley Stadium (pictured) hosted the London concert

The Coldstream Guards band opened with the "Royal Salute", a brief version of the national anthem "God Save the Queen". Status Quo were the first act to appear and started their set with "Rockin' All Over the World", also playing "Caroline" and fan favourite "Don't Waste My Time". "Bob told me: 'It doesn't matter a fuck what you sound like, just so long as you're there,'" recalled guitarist and singer Francis Rossi. "Thanks for the fucking honesty, Sir Bob." This would be the band's last appearance with bassist and founding member Alan Lancaster and drummer Pete Kircher. Diana, Princess of Wales and Charles, Prince of Wales were among those in attendance as the concert commenced.

Bob Geldof performed with the rest of the Boomtown Rats, singing "I Don't Like Mondays". He and the band paused just after the line "The lesson today is how to die" to loud applause. Gary Kemp said: "Dare I say it, it was evangelical, that moment when Geldof stopped 'I Don't Like Mondays' and raised his fist in the air. He was a sort of statesman. A link between punk and the New Romantics and the Eighties. You would follow him. He just has a huge charisma; he'd make a frightening politician." He finished the song and left the crowd to sing the final words. Elvis Costello sang a version of the Beatles' "All You Need Is Love", which he introduced by asking the audience to "help [him] sing this old northern English folk song".

Queen's twenty-one-minute performance, which began at 6:41 pm, was voted the greatest live performance in the history of rock in a 2005 industry poll of more than 60 artists, journalists and music industry executives. Freddie Mercury at times led the crowd in unison refrains, and his sustained note – "Aaaaaay-o" – during the a cappella section came to be known as "The Note Heard Round the World". The band's six-song set opened with a shortened version of "Bohemian Rhapsody" and closed with "We Are the Champions". According to the BBC's presenter David Hepworth, their performance produced "the greatest display of community singing the old stadium had seen and cemented Queen's position as the most-loved British group since the Beatles". Later in the evening, Mercury and guitarist Brian May performed the first song of the three-part Wembley event finale, "Is This the World We Created...?"

Other well-received performances on the day included those by U2 and David Bowie. Both The Guardian and Rolling Stone have cited Live Aid as the event that made stars of U2. The band played a 12-minute rendition of "Bad". The length of "Bad" limited them to two songs; a third, "Pride (In the Name of Love)", had to be dropped. During "Bad", vocalist Bono jumped off the stage to join the crowd and dance with a teenage girl. In July 2005, the woman said that he had saved her life. She was being crushed by people pushing forward; Bono saw this and gestured frantically at the ushers to help her. They did not understand what he was saying, and so he jumped down to help her himself. Rolling Stone described David Bowie's performance as "arguably Bowie's last triumph of the 1980s", observing that "as approximately two billion people sang along to 'Heroes' [...], he still seemed like one of the biggest and most vital rock stars in the world". According to Ultimate Classic Rock, Phil Collins also "performed an especially crowd-pleasing selection of songs", and John Illsley of Dire Straits recalled: "It was a very special feeling to be part of something so unique. Live Aid was a unique privilege for all of us. It's become a fabulous memory."

"One afternoon before the concert, Bowie was up in the office and we started looking through some videos of news footage, and we watched the CBC piece [footage from the Ethiopian famine, cut to the Cars' song "Drive"]. Everyone just stopped. Bowie said: 'You've got to put that in the show; it's the most dramatic thing I've ever seen.' That was probably one of the most evocative things in the whole show and really got the money rolling in."

— Live Aid promoter Harvey Goldsmith on Bowie picking out the CBC news piece for the concert, a video Bowie introduced on the big screen at Wembley after his set.

The transatlantic broadcast from Wembley suffered technical problems and failed during the Who's performance of their opening song "My Generation", immediately after Roger Daltrey sang "Why don't you all fade ..." (the last word "away" was cut off when a blown fuse caused the Wembley stage television feed temporarily to fail). The broadcast returned as the last verse of "Pinball Wizard" was played. John Entwistle's bass would not work at the start, causing an awkward delay of more than a minute before they could start playing. The band played with Kenney Jones on drums, and it was their first performance since disbanding after a 1982 "farewell" tour. The Who's performance was described as "rough but right" by Rolling Stone, but they would not perform together again for another three years. At 32 minutes Elton John had the longest set on the day; his setlist included the first performance of "Don't Let the Sun Go Down on Me" with George Michael.

While performing "Let It Be" near the end of the Wembley show, the microphone mounted to Paul McCartney's piano failed for the first two minutes of the song, making it difficult for television viewers and the stadium audience to hear him. During this performance, the television audience were better off, audio-wise, than the stadium audience, as the television sound was picked up from other microphones near McCartney. The stadium audience, who could obviously not hear the electronic sound feed from these mics unless they had portable television sets and radios, drowned out what little sound from McCartney could be heard during this part of his performance. As a result, organiser and performer Bob Geldof, accompanied by earlier performers David Bowie, Alison Moyet and Pete Townshend, returned to the stage to sing with him and back him up (as did the stadium audience despite not being able to hear much), by which time McCartney's microphone had been repaired.

At the conclusion of the Wembley performances, Geldof was raised onto the shoulders of the Who's guitarist Pete Townshend and Paul McCartney. Geldof stated that he had not slept "in weeks" in the lead-up to the concert, and when asked what his plans were post-Live Aid, he told an interviewer: "I'm going to go home and sleep."

The Wembley speaker system was provided by Hill Pro Audio. It consisted primarily of the Hill J-Series Mixing Consoles and Hill M3 Speaker System powered by the Hill 3000 amplifiers. In an interview with Studio Sound in December 1985, Malcolm Hill described the concept for the system in detail.

=== John F. Kennedy Stadium ===
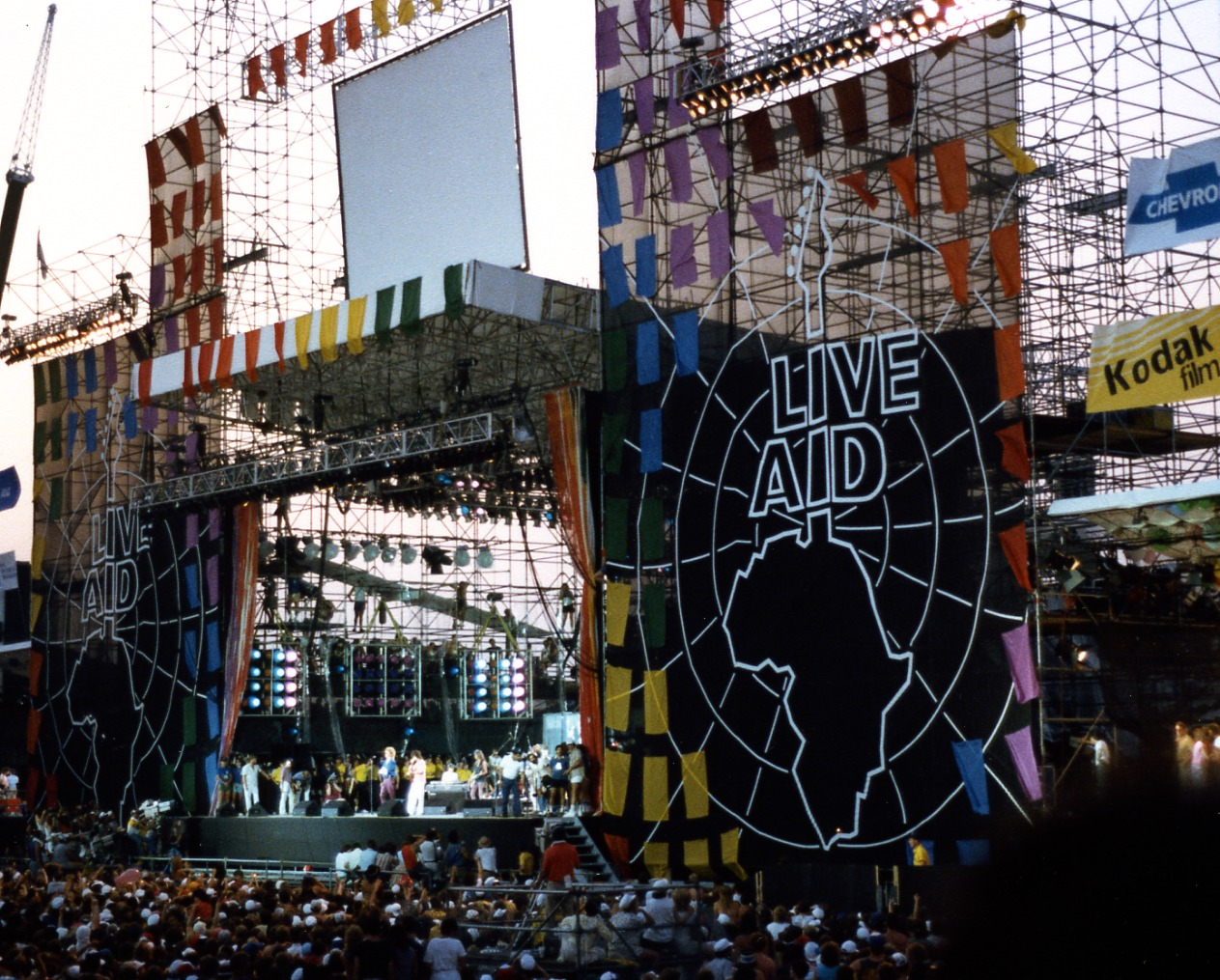
Stage view of Live Aid at John F. Kennedy Stadium in Philadelphia

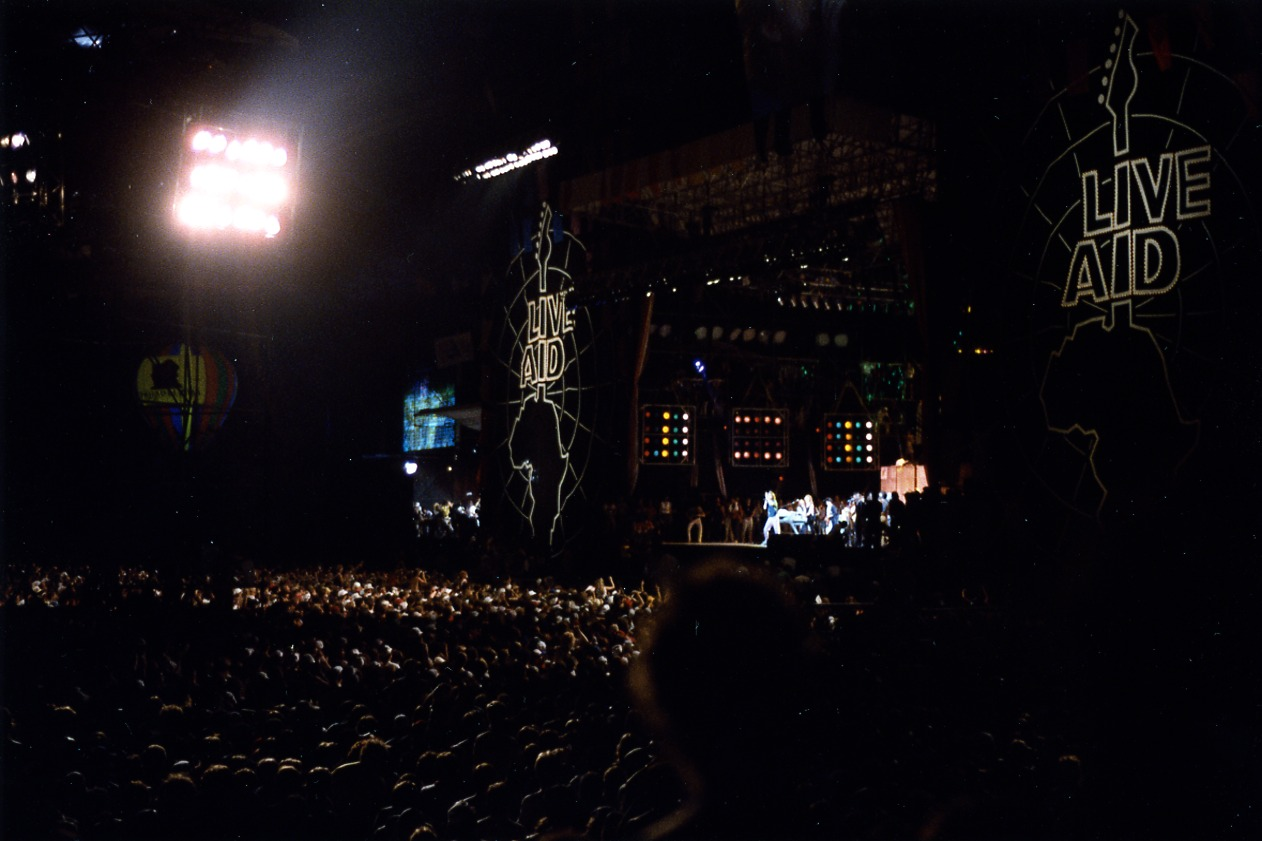
Live Aid under the lights at John F. Kennedy Stadium in Philadelphia

Actor Jack Nicholson hosted the televised portion of the Philadelphia concert. The opening artist Joan Baez announced to the crowd: "This is your Woodstock, and it's long overdue," before leading the crowd in singing "Amazing Grace" and "We Are the World".

Despite the 95 °F (35 °C) ambient temperature, Madonna proclaimed "I ain't taking shit off today!" during her set, referring to the recent release of early nude photos of her in Playboy and Penthouse magazines.

During his opening number, "American Girl", Tom Petty flipped the middle finger to somebody off stage about one minute into the song. Petty stated the song was a last-minute addition when the band realised that they would be the first act to play the American side of the concert after the London finale and "since this is, after all, JFK Stadium".

When Bob Dylan broke a guitar string while playing with the Rolling Stones members Keith Richards and Ronnie Wood, Wood took off his guitar and gave it to Dylan. Wood was left standing on stage guitarless. After shrugging to the audience, he played air guitar, even mimicking the Who's Pete Townshend by swinging his arm in wide circles until a stagehand brought him a replacement. The performance was included in the DVD, including the guitar switch and Wood talking to stagehands, but much of the footage used was close-ups of either Dylan or Richards.

During their duet on the reprise of "It's Only Rock 'n' Roll", Mick Jagger ripped away part of Tina Turner's dress, leaving her to finish the song in what was, effectively, a leotard.

The JFK portion included reunions of Crosby, Stills, Nash & Young, the original Black Sabbath with Ozzy Osbourne, the Beach Boys with Brian Wilson, and surviving members of Led Zeppelin, with Phil Collins and the Power Station (and former Chic) member Tony Thompson sharing duties on drums in place of the band's late drummer John Bonham (although they were not officially announced by their group name from the stage but were announced as Led Zeppelin on the VH1 10th Anniversary re-broadcast in 1995).

Teddy Pendergrass made his first public appearance since his near-fatal car accident in 1982, which paralysed him. Pendergrass, alongside Ashford & Simpson, performed "Reach Out and Touch". Bryan Adams, who came on after Judas Priest, recalled: "It was bedlam backstage", before performing a four-song set, including "Summer of '69".

Duran Duran performed a four-song set, which was the final time the five original band members publicly performed together until 2003. Their set saw a weak, off-key falsetto note hit by frontman Simon Le Bon during "A View to a Kill". The error was dubbed "The Bum Note Heard Round the World" by various media outlets, in contrast to Freddie Mercury's "Note Heard Round the World" at Wembley. Le Bon later recalled it was the most embarrassing moment of his career.

The UK television feed from Philadelphia was dogged by intermittent buzzing on the sound during Bryan Adams' turn on stage. This continued less frequently throughout the rest of the UK reception of the American concert, and the audio and video feed failed entirely during that performance and during Simple Minds' performance.

Phil Collins, who had performed in London earlier in the day, began his solo set, quipping: "I was in England this afternoon. Funny old world, innit?" to cheers from the Philadelphia crowd. Collins played the drums during Eric Clapton's 17-minute set, which included well-received performances of "Layla" and "White Room".

== Fund-raising ==
Throughout the concerts, viewers were urged to donate money to the Live Aid cause. The BBC operated three hundred phone lines so that members of the public could make donations using their credit cards. The phone number and an address to which viewers could send cheques were repeated every twenty minutes.

Nearly seven hours into the concert in London, Bob Geldof enquired how much money had been raised so far; he was told about £1.2 million. He is said to have been sorely disappointed by the amount and marched to the BBC commentary position. Pumped up further by a performance by Queen, which he later called "absolutely amazing", Geldof gave an interview in which BBC presenter David Hepworth had attempted to provide a postal address to which potential donations could be sent; Geldof interrupted him in mid-flow and shouted "fuck the address, let's get the numbers!" Although the phrase "give us your fuckin' money!" has passed into folklore, Geldof has said that it was never uttered. Private Eye magazine made great humorous capital out of this outburst, emphasising Geldof's Irish accent, which meant the profanities were heard as "fock" or "focking". After the outburst, donations increased to £300 per second.

Later in the evening, following David Bowie's set, a video shot by the Canadian Broadcasting Corporation was shown to the audiences in London and Philadelphia, as well as on televisions around the world (though neither US feed showed the film), showing starving and diseased Ethiopian children set to "Drive" by the Cars (this would also be shown at the London Live 8 concert in 2005). The rate of donations became faster in the aftermath of the video. Geldof had previously refused to allow the video to be shown due to time constraints and had only relented when Bowie offered to drop the song "Five Years" from his set as a trade-off.

Geldof mentioned during the concert that the Republic of Ireland gave the most donations per capita, despite being in the midst of a serious economic recession. The largest donation came from Mohammed bin Rashid Al Maktoum, then the son of the ruler of Dubai, who donated £1m in a phone conversation with Geldof. The next day, news reports stated that between £40 and £50 million had been raised. It is now estimated that around £150 million in total has been raised for famine relief as a direct result of the concerts.

== Criticisms and controversies ==
Bob Dylan's performance generated controversy. Prior to performing "When the Ship Comes In," he said: "I hope that some of the money that's raised for the people in Africa, maybe they can just take a little bit of it, maybe one or two million, maybe, and use it, say, to pay the mortgages on some of the farms that the farmers here owe to the banks." He is often misquoted, as on the Farm Aid website, as saying: "Wouldn't it be great if we did something for our own farmers right here in America?" In his autobiography, Is That It? (published in 1986), Geldof was critical of the remark, saying: "He displayed a complete lack of understanding of the issues raised by Live Aid. ... Live Aid was about people losing their lives. There is a radical difference between losing your livelihood and losing your life. It did instigate Farm Aid, which was a good thing in itself, but it was a crass, stupid, and nationalistic thing to say." Although Dylan's comments were criticised, his remark inspired fellow musicians Willie Nelson, Neil Young and John Mellencamp to organise the Farm Aid charity, which held its first concert in September 1985. The concert raised more than $9 million for America's family farmers and became an annual event.

Geldof was not happy about the Hooters being added as the opening band in Philadelphia. He felt pressured into it by Bill Graham and local promoter Larry Magid. Magid, promoting the concert through Electric Factory Concerts, argued that the band was popular in Philadelphia; their first major label album Nervous Night had been released almost three months earlier and had been a hit. In an interview for Rolling Stone, Geldof asked: "Who the fuck are the Hooters?" In December 2004, Geldof appeared on a bill with the Hooters in Germany as their opening act.

Adam Ant subsequently criticised the event and expressed regrets about playing it, saying: "I was asked by Sir Bob [sic] to promote this concert. They had no idea they could sell it out. Then, in Bob's book, he said: 'Adam was over the hill, so I let him have one number.' ... Doing that show was the biggest fucking mistake in the world. Knighthoods were made, Bono got it made, and it was a waste of fucking time. It was the end of rock 'n' roll." Geldof stated in his autobiography that Miles Copeland, manager of Adam Ant and Sting, asked Geldof if he had thought of asking Ant after Geldof contacted him to get Sting to appear: "I hadn't. I thought he was a bit passé. But then, so were the Boomtown Rats, and each represented a certain piece of pop history, so I agreed. I also thought that might entice him to encourage Sting, or perhaps all three of the Police."

BBC coverage co-host Andy Kershaw was heavily critical of the event in his autobiography No Off Switch, stating: "Musically, Live Aid was to be entirely predictable and boring. As they were wheeled out – or rather bullied by Geldof into playing – it became clear that this was another parade of the same old rock aristocracy in a concert for Africa, organised by someone who, while advertising his concern for and sympathy with the continent, didn't see fit to celebrate or dignify the place by including on the Live Aid bill a single African performer." Kershaw also described the event as "irritating, shallow, sanctimonious and self-satisfied" for failing to confront the fundamental causes of the famine and being "smug in its assumption that a bunch of largely lamentable rock and pop floozies was capable of making a difference, without tackling simultaneously underlying problems".

In 2005, British journalist John Harris criticized Queen's appearance at the event, saying that he was feeling disgust by their supposed feeling of concern about the situation of the third world, while the band had performed less than a year ago on the South African resort of Sun City. At the time, South Africa was under a cultural boycott, as a part of the wider sanctions in condemnation of the apartheid policy at the time. The band defended themselves by saying that they were a non-political group.

In 2024, Geldof rejected the charge that organising the concerts meant that he was a white saviour, calling the accusation "the greatest load of bollocks ever".

=== Led Zeppelin reunion ===
"I thought it was just going to be low-key and we'd all get together and have a play. But something happened between that conversation and the day – it became a Led Zeppelin reunion."

— Phil Collins on the Led Zeppelin performance

Led Zeppelin performed for the first time since the death of their drummer John Bonham in 1980. Two drummers filled in for Bonham: Phil Collins, who had played on singer Robert Plant's first two solo albums, and Tony Thompson. The performance was criticised for Plant's hoarse vocals, Jimmy Page's intoxication and out-of-tune Gibson Les Paul guitar (his Gibson EDS-1275 guitar was in tune), a lack of rehearsal, and poorly functioning monitors. Plant described the performance as "a fucking atrocity for us ... It made us look like loonies."

Page later criticised Collins' performance, saying: "Robert told me Phil Collins wanted to play with us. I told him that was all right if he knows the numbers. But at the end of the day, he didn't know anything. We played 'Whole Lotta Love', and he was just there bashing away cluelessly and grinning. I thought that was really a joke." Collins responded: "It wasn't my fault it was crap... If I could have walked off, I would have. But then we'd all be talking about why Phil Collins walked off Live Aid – so I just stuck it out... I turned up and I was a square peg in a round hole. Robert was happy to see me, but Jimmy wasn't."

Led Zeppelin has blocked broadcasts of the performance and withheld permission for it to be included on the DVD release. Philadelphia magazine named it "one of the worst rock-and-roll reunions of all time", with Victor Fiorillo writing: "I'd like to be able to blame all of the awfulness on anaemic Phil Collins, who sat in on drums, and Page himself later fingered the Genesis drummer for screwing up the set. But Collins was just the beginning of the bad. Go ahead. Watch and remember. It really was that terrible."

=== Fund use in Ethiopia ===
In 1986, Spin published an exposé on Live Aid's actions in Ethiopia. It wrote that Geldof deliberately ignored warnings from Médecins Sans Frontières, who had complained directly to Geldof even before Live Aid, about the role of the Ethiopian government under Derg leader Mengistu Haile Mariam in causing the famine and that by working with Mengistu directly, much of the relief funds intended for victims were in fact siphoned off to purchase arms from the Soviet Union, thereby exacerbating the situation. Geldof responded by deriding both the article and Médecins Sans Frontières, who had been expelled from the country, and reportedly said: "I'll shake hands with the Devil on my left and on my right to get to the people we are meant to help."

In 2010, the BBC World Service reported that some aid funds were siphoned off to buy arms for the Tigrayan People's Liberation Front, who battled at the time against the Derg. The BBC did not say that Band Aid funds were involved but played the Band Aid single to introduce the report. Other BBC programmes then repeated the World Service allegation and added an explicit reference to Band Aid. The Band Aid Trust complained to the BBC Editorial Complaints Unit regarding the specific allegations in the BBC World Service documentary, and the later repetitions, and their complaint was upheld. The BBC later issued an apology before every television and radio news bulletin to the Trust and acknowledged there was no evidence money had been diverted, while the British Ambassador to Ethiopia at the time, Brian Barder, issued a detailed rebuttal of the BBC claims, making clear that "the diversion of aid related only to the tiny proportion that was supplied by some NGOs to rebel-held areas" and was not an allegation about the bulk of emergency aid to Ethiopia during the famine.

Although a professed admirer of Geldof's generosity and concern, American television commentator Bill O'Reilly was critical of Live Aid's oversight of the use of the funds raised. O'Reilly believed that charity organisations operating in aid-receiving countries should control donations rather than "chaotic nations". Arguing that Live Aid accomplished good ends while inadvertently causing harm at the same time, David Rieff gave a presentation of similar concerns in The Guardian at the time of Live 8.

In an interview on NBC's Meet the Press shortly after O'Reilly's comments, host Tim Russert addressed these concerns to Bono. Bono responded that corruption, not disease or famine, was the greatest threat to Africa, agreeing with the belief that foreign relief organisations should decide how the money is spent. On the other hand, Bono said that it was better to spill some funds into nefarious quarters for the sake of those who needed it than to stifle aid because of possible theft.

== Performances ==
=== London, Wembley Stadium ===
Times are British Summer Time (BST) – UTC+01:00

Time	Performer(s)	Performed song(s)
12:00	Coldstream Guards	"Royal Salute" "God Save the Queen" (First six bars only)
12:01	Status Quo	"Rockin' All Over the World" "Caroline" "Don't Waste My Time"
12:19	The Style Council	"You're the Best Thing" "Big Boss Groove" "Internationalists" "Walls Come Tumbling Down!"
12:44	The Boomtown Rats	"I Don't Like Mondays" "Drag Me Down" "Rat Trap"
13:01	Adam Ant	"Vive Le Rock"
13:17	Ultravox	"Reap the Wild Wind" "Dancing with Tears in My Eyes" "One Small Day" "Vienna"
13:46	Spandau Ballet	"Only When You Leave" "Virgin" "True"
At 13:51 (08:51 EDT in Philadelphia), during Spandau Ballet's set, the impromptu first act took the stage at JFK Stadium. Joan Baez officially opened JFK at 14:01 (9:01 EDT), with performances at the two venues then overlapping through the next eight hours.
14:07	Elvis Costello	"All You Need Is Love"
14:22	Nik Kershaw	"Wide Boy" "Don Quixote" "The Riddle" "Wouldn't It Be Good"
14:53	Sade	"Why Can't We Live Together" "Your Love Is King" "Is It a Crime?"
15:18	Sting; Phil Collins; Branford Marsalis	"Roxanne" (Sting) "Driven to Tears" (Sting) "Against All Odds (Take a Look at Me Now)" (Phil Collins) "Message in a Bottle" (Sting) "In the Air Tonight" (Phil Collins) "Long Long Way to Go" (both) "Every Breath You Take" (both)
15:49	Howard Jones	"Hide and Seek"
16:08	Bryan Ferry (w/ David Gilmour as backing guitarist)	"Sensation" "Boys and Girls" "Slave to Love" "Jealous Guy"
16:40	Paul Young	"Do They Know It's Christmas?" (intro) "Come Back and Stay" "That's the Way Love Is" (with Alison Moyet) "Everytime You Go Away"
17:19	U2	"Sunday Bloody Sunday" "Bad" (w/ snippets of "Satellite of Love", "Ruby Tuesday", "Sympathy for the Devil" and "Walk on the Wild Side")
18:00	Dire Straits	"Money for Nothing" (with Sting) "Sultans of Swing"
18:41	Queen	"Bohemian Rhapsody" (ballad segment) "Radio Ga Ga" "Hammer to Fall" "Crazy Little Thing Called Love" "We Will Rock You" "We Are the Champions"
19:23	David Bowie	"TVC 15" "Rebel Rebel" "Modern Love" "'Heroes'"
19:59	The Who	"My Generation" "Pinball Wizard" "Love, Reign o'er Me" "Won't Get Fooled Again"
20:50	Elton John	"I'm Still Standing" "Bennie and the Jets" "Rocket Man" "Don't Go Breaking My Heart" (with Kiki Dee) "Don't Let the Sun Go Down on Me" (with Wham!) "Can I Get a Witness"
21:48	Freddie Mercury; Brian May	"Is This the World We Created...?"
21:51	Paul McCartney (w/ David Bowie, Bob Geldof, Alison Moyet and Pete Townshend)	"Let It Be"
21:57	Band Aid	"Do They Know It's Christmas?"

Presenters:

- Richard Skinner – opened the show and introduced Charles, Prince of Wales and Diana, Princess of Wales
- Tommy Vance – introduced the Coldstream Guards, Status Quo, the Style Council, the Boomtown Rats, Nik Kershaw and Dire Straits
- Harvey Goldsmith – introduced Adam Ant
- Andy Peebles – introduced Spandau Ballet, Elvis Costello, Noel Edmonds, Howard Jones, Bryan Ferry, Paul Young, Griff Rhys Jones with Mel Smith and David Bowie
- Noel Edmonds – introduced Sting with Phil Collins
- Griff Rhys Jones and Mel Smith – introduced Queen
- Jack Nicholson and Tommy Vance – introduced U2 and the Who
- Billy Connolly – introduced Elton John
- John Hurt – introduced Freddie Mercury and Brian May

=== Philadelphia, John F. Kennedy Stadium ===
Times are Eastern Daylight Time (EDT) – UTC−04:00

Time	Performer(s)	Performed song(s)
8:51	Bernard Watson	"All I Really Want to Do" "Interview"
9:01	Joan Baez	"Amazing Grace" "We Are the World"
9:10	The Hooters	"And We Danced" "All You Zombies"
9:32	Four Tops	"Shake Me, Wake Me (When It's Over)" "Bernadette" "It's the Same Old Song" "Reach Out I'll Be There" "I Can't Help Myself (Sugar Pie, Honey Bunch)"
9:45	Billy Ocean	"Caribbean Queen" "Loverboy"
9:55	Black Sabbath featuring Ozzy Osbourne	"Children of the Grave" "Iron Man" "Paranoid"
10:12	Run–D.M.C.	"Jam Master Jay" "King of Rock"
10:27	Rick Springfield	"Love Somebody" "State of the Heart" "Human Touch"
10:47	REO Speedwagon	"Can't Fight This Feeling" "Roll with the Changes"
11:12	Crosby, Stills and Nash	"Southern Cross" "Teach Your Children" "Suite: Judy Blue Eyes"
11:29	Judas Priest	"Living After Midnight" "The Green Manalishi (With the Two-Pronged Crown)" "You've Got Another Thing Comin'"
12:01	Bryan Adams	"Kids Wanna Rock" "Summer of '69" "Tears Are Not Enough" "Cuts Like a Knife"
12:39	The Beach Boys	"California Girls" "Help Me, Rhonda" "Wouldn't It Be Nice" "Good Vibrations" "Surfin' U.S.A."
13:26	George Thorogood and the Destroyers (w/ Bo Diddley and Albert Collins)	"Who Do You Love?" (w/ Bo Diddley) "The Sky Is Crying" "Madison Blues" (w/ Albert Collins)
14:05	Simple Minds	"Ghost Dancing" "Don't You (Forget About Me)" "Promised You a Miracle"
14:41	Pretenders	"Time the Avenger" "Message of Love" "Stop Your Sobbing" "Back on the Chain Gang" "Middle of the Road"
15:21	Santana (w/ Pat Metheny)	"Brotherhood" "Primera Invasion" "Open Invitation" (w/ "Voodoo Child (Slight Return)" snippet) "By the Pool" (w/ Pat Metheny) "Right Now" (w/ Pat Metheny)
15:57	Ashford & Simpson (w/ Teddy Pendergrass)	"Solid" "Reach Out and Touch (Somebody's Hand)" (w/ Teddy Pendergrass)
16:27	Madonna (w/ Thompson Twins and Nile Rodgers)	"Holiday" "Into the Groove" "Love Makes the World Go Round" (w/ Thompson Twins and Nile Rodgers)
17:02	Tom Petty and the Heartbreakers	"American Girl" "The Waiting" "Rebels" "Refugee"
A few minutes after 17:00 (after 22:00 BST in London), during Tom Petty and the Heartbreakers' set, Band Aid finished the final song of the day at Wembley Stadium, ending eight hours of overlapping performances at the two venues.
17:30	Kenny Loggins	"Footloose"
17:39	The Cars	"You Might Think" "Drive" "Just What I Needed" "Heartbeat City"
18:06	Neil Young	"Sugar Mountain" "The Needle and the Damage Done" "Helpless" "Nothing Is Perfect (In God's Perfect Plan)" "Powderfinger"
18:42	The Power Station	"Murderess" "Get It On"
19:21	Thompson Twins (w/ Madonna, Steve Stevens and Nile Rodgers)	"Hold Me Now" "Revolution" (w/ Madonna, Steve Stevens and Nile Rodgers)
19:38	Eric Clapton (w/ Phil Collins)	"White Room" "She's Waiting" "Layla"
20:00	Phil Collins	"Against All Odds (Take a Look at Me Now)" "In the Air Tonight"
20:10	Led Zeppelin (w/ Phil Collins)	"Rock and Roll" "Whole Lotta Love" "Stairway to Heaven"
20:39	Crosby, Stills, Nash & Young	"Only Love Can Break Your Heart" "Daylight Again/Find the Cost of Freedom"
20:46	Duran Duran	"A View to a Kill" "Union of the Snake" "Save a Prayer" "The Reflex"
21:20	Patti LaBelle	"New Attitude" "Imagine" "Forever Young" "Stir It Up" "Over the Rainbow" "Why Can't I Get It Over"
21:50	Hall & Oates (w/ Eddie Kendricks and David Ruffin)	"Out of Touch" "Maneater" "Get Ready" (w/ Eddie Kendricks) "Ain't Too Proud to Beg" (w/ David Ruffin) "The Way You Do the Things You Do" "My Girl" (w/ Eddie Kendricks and David Ruffin)
22:15	Mick Jagger (w/ Tina Turner)	"Lonely at the Top" "Just Another Night" "Miss You" "State of Shock" (w/ Tina Turner) "It's Only Rock 'n Roll (But I Like It) (Reprise)" (w/ Tina Turner)
22:39	Bob Dylan; Keith Richards; Ronnie Wood	"Blowin' in the Wind" "Ballad of Hollis Brown" "When the Ship Comes In"
22:55	USA for Africa	"We Are the World"

Presenters:

- Bill Graham – introduced Jack Nicholson (before his first and last appearance), Chevy Chase w/ Joe Piscopo, Marilyn McCoo, Dire Straits, Santana, Bette Midler, Don Johnson, Eric Clapton and Dionne Warwick
- Jack Nicholson – introduced Joan Baez, U2, Bryan Adams, the Who and Bob Dylan
- Chevy Chase and Joe Piscopo – introduced the Hooters
- Chevy Chase – introduced Four Tops, Billy Ocean, Black Sabbath, REO Speedwagon, Judas Priest, Kenny Loggins Mick Jagger with David Bowie (video) and Duran Duran
- Joe Piscopo – introduced Run-D.M.C., Rick Springfield, Simple Minds and Neil Young
- Marilyn McCoo – introduced the Beach Boys
- George Segal – introduced George Thorogood and the Destroyers
- Grace Slick – introduced the Pretenders
- Bette Midler – introduced Madonna, Thompson Twins, Patti LaBelle, Mick Jagger and the Cars
- Don Johnson – introduced Tom Petty and the Heartbreakers and the Power Station
- Jack Nicholson & Bette Midler – introduced Phil Collins
- Phil Collins – introduced Led Zeppelin
- Dionne Warwick – introduced Hall & Oates

=== Others ===
Time	Location	Performer(s)	Performed song(s)
13:05	Sydney, Australia	Oz for Africa	various (depends on the broadcaster)
13:34	studio (performers from Japan)	Loudness	"Gotta Fight"
13:34	studio (performers from Japan)	Off Course	"Endless Night"
13:34	studio (performers from Japan)	Takako Shirai	"Foolish War"
13:34	studio (performers from Japan)	Eikichi Yazawa	"Take It Time"
13:34	studio (performers from Japan)	Motoharu Sano	"Shame"
13:34	studio (performers from Japan)	Meiko Nakahara	"Ro-Ro-Ro-Russian Roulette"
14:12	Vienna, Austria	Austria für Afrika	"Warum?"
14:40	The Hague, Netherlands (from the North Sea Jazz Festival)	B.B. King	"When It All Comes Down" "Why I Sing the Blues" "Don't Answer the Door" "Rock Me Baby"
15:10	(Socialist Federal Republic of Yugoslavia) Belgrade, Yugoslavia	YU Rock Misija	"Za milion godina"
15:55	Moscow, Soviet Union	Autograph	"Golovokruzhenie" "Nam nuzhen mir"
16:27	Cologne, West Germany	Band für Afrika	"Nackt Im Wind" "Ein Jahr (Es geht voran)"
20:44	Norway	Stavanger for Africa	"All of Us"
20:44	Norway	Forente Artister	"Sammen for Livet"
21:19	studio	Kool & the Gang	"Stand Up and Sing" "Cherish"
22:11	London, United Kingdom	Cliff Richard	"A World of Difference"

Presenters:

- Molly Meldrum – introduced Oz for Africa
- Mladen Popović – introduced YU Rock Misija
- Vladimir Posner – introduced Autograph and made a speech between their performances
- Evelyn Selbert and Ken Janz – introduced Band für Afrika
- Udo Lindenberg – made a speech between the Band für Afrika performances
- Andy Kershaw – introduced Cliff Richard

=== Notable absences ===
Bruce Springsteen decided not to appear at Live Aid despite his huge global popularity in 1985. Geldof had originally scheduled the event for 6 July but moved the date to the 13th, especially to accommodate Springsteen. Springsteen later expressed regret at turning down Geldof's invitation, stating that he "simply did not realise how big the whole thing was going to be" and regretted not performing an acoustic set. During the MTV broadcast, VJ Martha Quinn repeatedly and erroneously claimed that Springsteen would in fact make an appearance.

Michael Jackson declined to appear, as he was working on Bad, an album which would not be released until more than two years after the Live Aid concert. His press agent, Norman Winter, released a statement at the time saying that Jackson was "working around the clock in the studio on a project that he's made a major commitment to" and consequently could not free up sufficient time to rehearse and perform at Live Aid. Winter added: "Michael is just about living in the studio, rehearsing and recording. I know what could be more major than Live Aid, but Michael couldn't turn his back on his responsibility to the people he's working with. This affected employment for a lot of people."

Prince also declined to appear in person but sent a pre-taped video of an acoustic version of "4 the Tears in Your Eyes", which was played during the concert in Philadelphia. The original version appears on the We Are the World album, while the video version was released in 1993 on Prince's compilation The Hits/The B-Sides.

Culture Club leader Boy George decided not to take part in the concert. He feared that Culture Club would fail to measure up performing for two billion people, and he disliked what he viewed as self-important posturing on the part of other participants. In his memoir Take It Like a Man he said his band members were angry with him because he had "ruined their chance of a part in history".

Huey Lewis and the News were scheduled to play the Philadelphia leg and were in some of the promotional material but decided on 28 June to pull out over concerns that the money raised by relief efforts thus far had not been reaching those it was intended to help. "It was a very tough decision", Lewis told Rolling Stone. "We felt, having done the USA for Africa thing, that we should wait and watch that ... The prudent thing to do is to see how that money translates into food for the people before we do another one." Harry Belafonte, who had organised USA for Africa, responded harshly, calling Lewis's scepticism "disruptive and divisive". He had himself recently returned from a trip to Africa to see how the money had so far been spent and suggested that Lewis do the same. "For him to sit back here and send out information based on hearsay is unfair to his colleagues and very unfair to the victims."

Annie Lennox, whose hits as the vocalist of Eurythmics included 1983's "Sweet Dreams (Are Made of This)", was forced to pull out of performing at Live Aid due to a serious throat infection; she appeared at Live 8 held in Hyde Park, London in 2005.

Cliff Richard later stated he had been unable to perform as he was already committed to a gospel charity concert in Birmingham the same day.

A reunited Deep Purple were also due to appear from Switzerland via satellite, but pulled out after guitarist Ritchie Blackmore refused to take part. Deep Purple (minus Blackmore, who left the band in 1993) appeared at Geldof's Live 8 sequel 20 years later, performing at the Toronto leg of the event. Bill Graham is said to have turned down Foreigner and Yes because there was no free space on the bill for them.

Marillion, riding high in the UK charts that summer with their Misplaced Childhood album and "Kayleigh" single, missed out on an invitation to perform at Wembley because their manager had deemed it not worthwhile for singer Fish to participate in the "Do They Know It's Christmas?" single. Fish was quoted: "When it came to the bill for the concert, we were passed over."

UB40 lead singer Ali Campbell admitted that his band was also ignored by Geldof while planning the list of musical acts of the British leg of the event: "We weren't asked to do Live Aid because Uncle Bob didn't like our music much. It was a great gig, but I thought it was a bit dodgy not having any black acts on the bill when it was raising money for Africa."

Madness were invited, but they declined as they were busy recording songs for their upcoming album Mad Not Mad, according to guitarist Chris Foreman. They were also in a period of heavy turmoil after falling out with Stiff Records and losing their keyboardist Mike Barson, and were considering splitting up at the time. As secondary vocalist Carl Smyth put it in 2002, "They were going, ‘Come and do Live Aid, it’ll be really good for you. It’s gonna be televised everywhere.’ And we said, ‘Sorry mate, we’re splitting up because we’re not happy.’ Which was probably a mistake, in retrospect, but we certainly had our ideals in those days."

Thin Lizzy had broken up two years before Live Aid, with lead singer Phil Lynott's last years heavily affected by heroin and alcohol addictions, dying less than six months after Live Aid from complications associated with his addictions. Despite this, keyboard player Darren Wharton, in a 2011 interview, expressed anger about the band not being asked to perform, believing that Geldof taking a risk and inviting the band to reunite might have helped Lynott overcome his addictions, and also regain his full performance readiness, within the few months between an invite and the concert date.

"I tried to pitch into Live Aid," recalled Roger Waters. "They asked me to put Pink Floyd back together for it, and I said no, but I'd bring my new band to play. They didn't want that. But that's alright. I went along on my own." Waters appeared backstage at the Wembley Stadium leg of Live Aid (where he was interviewed), and the classic Pink Floyd lineup reunited for the follow-up to Live Aid, Live 8, in 2005.

Neil Peart, drummer of Canadian rock band Rush, said: "Geddy was involved with the Northern Lights charity record here in Canada, although Rush wasn't invited to participate in the Live Aid event – mainly because if you look at the guest list, it was very much an 'in-crowd' situation. We were 'out' by then. We didn't refuse to take part because of any principles. Mind you, I wouldn't have been happy being part of this scenario. Those stars should have shut up and just given over their money if they were genuine. I recall that Tears for Fears, who made a musical and artistic decision to pull out of the concert, were subsequently accused by Geldof of killing children in Africa – what a shockingly irresponsible and stupid attitude to take. But I have nothing bad whatsoever to say about Bob Geldof; he sacrificed his health, his career, [and] everything for something he believed in. But others around him got involved for their own reasons. Some of those involved in Northern Lights were actually quoted as saying that their managers told them to get down to the recording sessions because it would be a good career move!"

Big Country, despite being popular at the time did not perform at the concert because Geldof wrongly believed that they had split up. Their lead singer Stuart Adamson was also in recovery from alcoholism at the time. The band did however appear at the final encore.

== International broadcasting ==
Broadcasters
Country	Broadcaster	Channel(s)	Time	Ref(s)
Australia	ABC	ABC-3	(13 July) 20:55 until end	
Austria	ORF	FS2	(13 July) 12:45 CET until end	
Belgium	RTBF	Télé 2	(13 July) 12:45 CET until end	
Belgium	BRT	BRT TV2	(13 July) 12:45 CET until end	
Canada	CHUM	MuchMusic	(13 July) 07:00 until end	
Canada	CTV		(13 July) 20:00 – 23:00	
Denmark	DR	DR TV	(13 July) 13:00 CET – 17:53, 22:34 until end (14 July) 14:00 – 16:00	
France	Antenne 2		(13 July) 22:10 until end	
Hong Kong	TVB	TVB Pearl	(13 July) 19:15 – (14 July) 10:00	
Iceland	RÚV	Sjónvarpið	(13 July) 22:45 until end	
Ireland	RTÉ	RTÉ 1	(13 July) 11:45 until end	
Italy	RAI	Rai Tre	(13 July) circa 13:00 CET – 19:25, 23:15 until end (14 July) circa 14:00 – 18:00	
Japan	FNN	Fuji Television	(13 July) 20:00 JST – until end	
Japan	FNN	Kansai Television	(13 July) 20:00 JST – until end	
Japan	NNN	Nippon Television	(13 July) 20:00 JST – until end	
Japan	NNN	Yomiuri Television	(13 July) 20:00 JST – until end	
Netherlands	NOS/VARA	Nederland 1	(13 July) 12:50 CET – until end. (Note: Nederland 1 took three limited breaks: local news at 17:30 – 18:00 and brief news updates at 20:00 and 23:15)	
Netherlands Antilles	TeleCuraçao			
New Zealand	TVNZ	TV2	(13 July) 23:00 until end	
Norway	NRK	NRK Fjernsynet	(13 July) 12:50 CET – 17:05, 24:00 until end (14 July) 12:00 – 18:30 CET	
Portugal	RTP	RTP1	(13 July) 17:05 – 18:45, 22:30 until end (14 July) 11:50 – 15:25	
Puerto Rico	TeleOro Canal 13		(13 July) 07:00 until end	
South Korea	MBC	MBC	(13 July) 20:00 KST – until end	
Spain	RTVE	TVE 1	(13 July) 14:15 – 15:00, 21:35 – 22:00 (14 July) 14:00 – 15:00	
Spain	RTVE	TVE 2	(13 July) 19:10 – 20:25 (14 July) 21:35 – 22:35 (July 15) 00:10 – 00:40	
Sweden	SVT	TV1	(13 July) 12:50 CET - 16:00	
Sweden	SVT	TV2	(13 July) 16:00 CET - 18:50, 21:00 - 23:50	
Sweden	RR	SR P2	(13 July) 15:00 CET - 18:00	
Sweden	RR	SR P3	(13 July) 18:15 CET until end	
Switzerland	SRG SSR	SRG Sportkette	(13 July) 13:00 CET until end	
Switzerland	SRG SSR	SSR Chaîne sportive	(13 July) 13:00 CET until end	
Switzerland	SRG SSR	SSR Canale sportivo	(13 July) 13:00 CET until end	
Switzerland	SRG SSR	Radio DRS 3	(13 July) 13:00 CET until end	
Switzerland	SRG SSR	Couleur 3	(13 July) 13:00 CET until end	
United Kingdom	BBC	BBC2	(13 July) 11:50 – 22:00	
United Kingdom	BBC	BBC1	(13 July) 22:00 until end	
United Kingdom	BBC	Radio One	(13 July) 11:50 until end	
United Kingdom	BFBS	BFBS 1	(13 July) 23:00 – 01:00	
United States	ABC		(13 July) 07:00 until end	
United States	MTV		(13 July) 07:00 until end	
West Germany	ARD	BR	(13 July) 12:30 CET until end	
West Germany	ARD	HR	(13 July) 12:30 CET until end	
West Germany	ARD	NDR	(13 July) 12:30 CET until end	
West Germany	ARD	RB	(13 July) 12:30 CET until end	
West Germany	ARD	SDR	(13 July) 12:30 CET until end	
West Germany	ARD	SFB	(13 July) 12:30 CET until end	
West Germany	ARD	SR	(13 July) 12:30 CET until end	
West Germany	ARD	SWF	(13 July) 12:30 CET until end	
West Germany	ARD	WDR	(13 July) 12:30 CET until end	
Yugoslavia	JRT	TV Beograd 2	(13 July) 12:50 CET until end	
Yugoslavia	JRT	TV Ljubljana 1	(13 July) 12:50 CET until end	
Yugoslavia	JRT	TV Ljubljana 2	(13 July) 12:50 CET until end	
Yugoslavia	JRT	TV Pristina	(13 July) 12:50 CET until end	
Yugoslavia	JRT	TV Sarajevo 2	(13 July) 12:50 CET until end	
Yugoslavia	JRT	TV Skopje 2	(13 July) 12:50 CET until end	
Yugoslavia	JRT	TV Titograd 2	(13 July) 12:50 CET until end	
Yugoslavia	JRT	TV Zagreb 2	(13 July) 12:50 CET until end	

== Live Aid recordings ==
When organiser Bob Geldof was persuading artists to take part in the concert, he promised them that it would be a one-off event, never to be seen again. Hence, the concert was never recorded in its complete original form, and only secondary television broadcasts were recorded. Following Geldof's request, ABC erased its own broadcast tapes. However, before the syndicated/ABC footage was erased, copies of it were donated to the Smithsonian Institution and have now been presumed lost. The ABC feed of the USA for Africa/"We Are The World" finale does exist in its entirety, complete with the network end credits, and can be found as a supplemental feature on the We Are The World: The Story Behind The Song DVD.

Meanwhile, MTV decided to keep recordings of its broadcast and eventually located more than 100 tapes of Live Aid in its archives, but many songs in these tapes were cut short by MTV's ad breaks and presenters (according to the BBC). Many performances from the US were not shown on the BBC, and recordings of these performances are missing. There were four separate Audio Trucks in Philadelphia provided by David Hewitt of Remote Recording Services. ABC had taken the decision that no multi track tape recordings would be allowed, so no remixing of the Philadelphia show was possible.

=== Official Live Aid DVD ===
An official four-disc DVD set of the Live Aid concerts was released on 8 November 2004. A premiere to launch the new DVD was held on 7 November and shown in DTS surround sound featuring a short compilation of the four-disc set. The screening was held at the Odeon Cinema in Kensington, London and included guests such as Brian May, Anita Dobson, Roger Taylor, Bob Geldof and partner Jean Marie, Annie Lennox, Midge Ure, Michael Buerk, Gary Kemp and The Darkness. Other theatrical premieres were held in Zürich, Milan, Rome, Vienna, Hamburg and Berlin. A 52-minute compilation was later released as a limited edition DVD in July 2005 titled 20 Years Ago Today: Live Aid. The box set contains 10-hour partial footage of the 16-hour length concert. The DVD was produced by Geldof's company, Woodcharm Ltd., and distributed by Warner Music Vision. The DVD has since been out of print and is no longer available in stores. The decision to finally release it was taken by Bob Geldof nearly 20 years after the original concerts after he found a number of unlicensed copies of the concert on the Internet.

The most complete footage that exists is used from the BBC source, and this was the main source of the DVD. During production of the official DVD, MTV lent Woodcharm Ltd. their B-roll and alternate camera footage where MTV provided extra footage of the Philadelphia concert (where ABC had erased the tapes from the command of Bob Geldof). Songs that were not originally interrupted with advertisements were also used on the official DVD.

Working from the BBC and MTV footage, several degrees of dramatic licence were taken to release the concert on DVD. Many songs had their soundtracks altered for the DVD release, mainly in sequences where there were originally microphone problems. In one of those instances, Paul McCartney had re-recorded his failed vocals for "Let It Be" in a studio the day after the concert (14 July 1985). Beatles' biographer Keith Badman explains: "because of what happened, he decided to re-record his vocals for any future film of the concert. That's the version you'll hear when the DVD comes out." Also, in the US finale, the original USA for Africa studio track for "We Are the World" was overlaid in places where the microphone was absent (consequently, it includes the vocals of Kenny Rogers and James Ingram, two artists who did not even take part in Live Aid).

Some artists did not want their performances to be featured on the DVD. At their own request, Led Zeppelin and Santana were omitted. The former defended their decision not to be included on the grounds that their performance was "sub-standard", but to lend their support, Jimmy Page and Robert Plant pledged to donate proceeds from the DVD release of Page & Plant: No Quarter to the campaign, and John Paul Jones pledged proceeds from his American tour with Mutual Admiration Society.

Judicious decisions were also made on which acts would be included and which ones would not due to either technical difficulties in the original performances, the absence of original footage, or music rights reasons. Rick Springfield, the Four Tops, the Hooters, the Power Station, Billy Ocean and Kool and the Gang were among those acts that were left off the DVD. Several artists who did feature on the DVD also had songs that were performed omitted. Madonna performed three solo songs in the concert, but only two were included on the DVD ("Love Makes the World Go Round" was omitted). Phil Collins played "Against All Odds" and "In the Air Tonight" at both Wembley and JFK, but only the London performance of the former and the Philadelphia performance of the latter were included on the DVD. The JFK performance of "Against All Odds" was later included in Collins' Finally ... The First Farewell Tour DVD. Tom Petty performed four songs, and only two were included on DVD. Patti LaBelle played six songs, but only two songs were included.

In 2007, Queen released a special edition of Queen Rock Montreal on Blu-ray and DVD formats containing their 1981 concert from The Forum in Montreal, Canada, and their complete Live Aid performance, alongside Freddie Mercury and Brian May performing "Is This the World We Created...?" from the UK Live Aid finale, all re-mixed in DTS 5.1 sound by Justin Shirley-Smith. Also included is their Live Aid rehearsal and an interview with the band from earlier in the week.

On its release, the then British Chancellor of the Exchequer, Gordon Brown, decided the VAT collected on sales of the Live Aid DVD would be given back to the charity, which would raise an extra £5 for every DVD sold.

On 14 November 2004, the DVD entered the UK Official Music Video Chart at number one and stayed in the top position for twelve consecutive weeks.

==== Charts ====
Chart (2004)	Peak position	Ref(s)
Dutch Music DVDs Chart	2	
Spanish Music DVD Chart (Promusicae)	8	
UK Music Video Chart (OCC)	1	
US Top Music Video (Billboard)	2	

==== Certifications ====
Region	Certification	Certified units/sales
Australia (ARIA)	2× Platinum	30,000^{^}
Austria (IFPI Austria)	Gold	5,000^{*}
Canada (Music Canada)	2× Diamond	200,000^{^}
France (SNEP)	Platinum	15,000^{*}
Switzerland (IFPI Switzerland)	Platinum	6,000^{^}
United Kingdom (BPI)	6× Platinum	300,000^{*}
United Kingdom (BPI) 20 Years Ago Today version	Gold	25,000^{*}
United States (RIAA)	10× Platinum	1,000,000^{^}
^{*} Sales figures based on certification alone.^{^} Shipments figures based on certification alone.

=== Official Live Aid audio ===
An audio copy of Live Aid was officially released by the Band Aid Trust label on 7 September 2018 on digital download. When first released in 2018, the Queen performance was excluded. The band's set was, however, later included as a part of the digital download in May 2019. It has a total of ninety-three audio tracks.

=== Live Aid channel ===
On 12 September 2018, YouTube launched the Official Live Aid channel with a total of 87 videos from the Live Aid 1985 concert. According to the channel, all earnings from viewings go to the Band Aid Trust. As with the digital download release, a few notable performances are not included for unknown reasons, although Queen's set was uploaded to the channel with its inclusion on the digital download.

=== Unofficial recordings ===
Because the Live Aid broadcast was watched by 1.5 billion people, most of the footage was recorded on home consumer video recorders all around the world, in various qualities. Many of these recordings were in mono because, in the mid-1980s, most home video machines could record only mono sound and also because the European BBC TV broadcast was in mono. The US MTV broadcast, the ABC Radio Network and BBC Radio 1 simulcasts were stereo. These recordings circulated among collectors and, in recent years, have also appeared on the Internet in file sharing networks.

Since the official DVD release of Live Aid includes only partial footage of this event, unofficial distribution sources continue to be the only source of the most complete recordings. The official DVD is the only authorised video release in which proceeds go directly to famine relief, the cause that the concert was originally intended to help.

== Legacy ==
Live Aid eventually raised $127 million ($370 million in 2024 terms) in famine relief for African nations, and the publicity it generated encouraged Western nations to make available enough surplus grain to end the immediate hunger crisis in Africa. According to one aid worker, a larger impact than the money raised for the Ethiopian famine is that "humanitarian concern is now at the centre of foreign policy" for the west.

Regarding Buerk's landmark BBC News report as a watershed moment in crisis reporting that influenced modern coverage – one that was broadcast in its entirety with Buerk's narration on a major US channel – Suzanne Franks in The Guardian states: "the nexus of politics, media and aid are influenced by the coverage of a famine 30 years ago."

Many artists and performers at Live Aid gained prominence and positive commercial influence. For all the cultural, charitable, and technological significance of 1985's Live Aid, its most immediate impact was on the charts. In the UK, for example, No Jacket Required by Phil Collins and Madonna's Like a Virgin leapt back into the top ten. Queen's three-year-old Greatest Hits rose fifty-five places into the top twenty, followed by Freddie Mercury's Mr. Bad Guy. Every U2 album available at the time also returned to the chart. In 1986, Geldof received an honorary knighthood from Queen Elizabeth II for his efforts. Claire Bertschinger, the nurse who featured in Buerk's news reports that sparked the aid relief movement, received the Florence Nightingale Medal in 1991 for her work in nursing and was made a Dame by Queen Elizabeth II in 2010 for "services to Nursing and to International Humanitarian Aid".

Queen's performance at Live Aid was later recreated in the band's biographical film Bohemian Rhapsody in 2018. Footage from the original performance can be seen to match very accurately with the movie performance. In 2020, Queen + Adam Lambert reprised the original Queen setlist from Live Aid for the Fire Fight Australia charity concert in Sydney, Australia.

The background to the staging of the concert as a whole was dramatised in the 2010 television drama When Harvey Met Bob.

In November 2023, Geldof stated that a six-part miniseries about Live Aid was being produced by Disney as well as an IMAX-format theatrical documentary from Geldof himself.

A jukebox musical based on the day, Just for One Day (named after a line in Bowie's song "'Heroes'", which he performed at the event), had its world premiere at The Old Vic in London in February 2024.

In August 2024, opening for Taylor Swift's Eras Tour at Wembley Stadium, Hayley Williams, lead vocalist of Paramore, tributed Freddie Mercury's Live Aid performance. Wearing an outfit compared to the one Mercury wore, Williams led the audience in unison refrains, similar to Mercury's during Queen's set, while the other band members took a break.

In 2025, a four part documentary film series was released titled Live Aid: When Rock 'n' Roll Took on the World.

== See also ==
- 1983–1985 famine in Ethiopia
- Band Aid
- Farm Aid, a Live Aid-inspired relief event for American farms, instigated by Bob Dylan
- Live 8, Geldof's 2005 series of concerts aimed at increasing poverty awareness
- Hear 'n Aid, similar joint effort from the heavy metal scene of the 1980s
- List of highest-grossing benefit concerts
- List of historic rock festivals
- Self Aid, a 1986 Live Aid-inspired concert highlighting severe unemployment in Ireland, promoted by Jim Aiken
- Sport Aid, another famine relief event organised by Geldof
- Together at Home
- When Harvey Met Bob, a 2010 television film dramatising the events leading up to and including the concert
- YU Rock Misija (YU Rock Mission), Yugoslav contribution to Band Aid campaign

== Bibliography ==
- Davis, H. Louise. "Feeding the world a line?: Celebrity activism and ethical consumer practices from Live Aid to Product Red." Nordic Journal of English Studies 9.3 (2010): 89–118.
- Westley, Frances. "Bob Geldof and Live Aid: the affective side of global social innovation." Human Relations 44.10 (1991): 1011–1036.
- Live Aid: Rockin' All Over the World is a BBC2 documentary that recalls the build-up to and the day itself; it was aired on 18 June 2005, with an update in 2025.
- Live Aid at 40 (alternately Live Aid: When Rock 'n' Roll Took On the World), 2025 multi-part documentary produced by Brook Lapping / BBC / CNN Originals
- Live Aid: World Wide Concert Book – Peter Hillmore with Introduction by Bob Geldof, ISBN 0-88101-024-3, Copyright 1985, The Unicorn Publishing House, New Jersey.
