= Philadelphia Freedom Concert =

2005 fundraiser

Coordinates: 39.965°N 75.179°W

The Philadelphia Freedom Concert and Ball was an HIV/AIDS awareness fund raising event that was held in Philadelphia, United States, on July 4, 2005.

== History ==
The ball was held at the Philadelphia Museum of Art prior to the multi-act concert. Tickets were $1,000 each and included numerous celebrities, including, the orchestrator of the event, Elton John. Chefs from the city provided food and entertainment was provided by local groups. The concert itself was held outside the museum, using the stage from the Live 8 concert only a few days before. VIP tickets costing $500 allowed people to sit in twenty-five rows set up in front of the stage; otherwise, it was a standing only event. More than one million people attended.

The concert was hosted by Wayne Brady and Bruce Vilanch and included other guests, such as Billie Jean King. Performers included Bryan Adams, Patti LaBelle, Rufus Wainwright, Peter Nero and the Philly Pops, culminating with a performance by Elton John (who was introduced by long-time friend and AIDS activist Billie Jean King). John opened with "The Bitch Is Back", followed by "Bennie and the Jets", "Rocket Man", "I Guess That's Why They Call It The Blues", "Tiny Dancer", and ended with "Philadelphia Freedom" with the Philadelphia Pops.

The concert was followed by a fireworks display.
