= The Platinum Collection (Queen album) =

The Platinum Collection: Greatest Hits I, II & III

Box set by Queen
- Released: 13 November 2000
- Recorded: 1973–1999
- Genre: Rock
- Length: 208:12
- Labels: Parlophone; Hollywood

Queen chronology
Greatest Hits III (1999)	The Platinum Collection: Greatest Hits I, II & III (2000)	Queen on Fire – Live at the Bowl (2004)

Professional ratings
Review scores
Source	Rating
AllMusic	4.0/5 stars

The Platinum Collection: Greatest Hits I, II & III is a box set by British rock band Queen which comprises their three greatest hits albums, Greatest Hits, Greatest Hits II and Greatest Hits III. The album was originally released on 13 November 2000 on the Parlophone label. A booklet with song facts and images is also included with the three CD set. The US release was delayed by Hollywood Records until September 2002 and featured the 2001 Japanese release remastered versions of Greatest Hits Volumes 1 and 2 on the US and Canadian versions of The Platinum Collection. The album peaked at number 2 in the UK.

On 27 June 2011, as part of Queen's 40th anniversary celebrations, The Platinum Collection was re-released in the UK as well as in other territories around the world. The release consisted of the 2011 remasters of all three albums.

In 2018, the album reached a peak of number 9 on the US Billboard 200 following the success of the Bohemian Rhapsody film and soundtrack, making it their first time with two albums in the US albums chart top 10. In 2019, the album reached a higher peak at number 6 on the US Billboard 200 thanks to sale pricing in the iTunes Store during the tracking week.

== Track listing ==
Disc one: Greatest Hits (1981 UK version)
No.	Title	Writer(s)	Original album	Length
1.	"Bohemian Rhapsody"	Freddie Mercury	A Night at the Opera, 1975	5:55
2.	"Another One Bites the Dust"	John Deacon	The Game, 1980	3:36
3.	"Killer Queen"	Mercury	Sheer Heart Attack, 1974	3:00
4.	"Fat Bottomed Girls" (Single Version)	Brian May	Jazz, 1978	3:23
5.	"Bicycle Race"	Mercury	Jazz	3:01
6.	"You're My Best Friend"	Deacon	A Night at the Opera	2:52
7.	"Don't Stop Me Now"	Mercury	Jazz	3:29
8.	"Save Me"	May	The Game	3:48
9.	"Crazy Little Thing Called Love"	Mercury	The Game	2:44
10.	"Somebody to Love"	Mercury	A Day at the Races, 1976	4:56
11.	"Now I'm Here"	May	Sheer Heart Attack	4:14
12.	"Good Old-Fashioned Lover Boy"	Mercury	A Day at the Races	2:54
13.	"Play the Game"	Mercury	The Game	3:33
14.	"Flash" (Single Version)	May	Flash Gordon, 1980	2:48
15.	"Seven Seas of Rhye"	Mercury	Queen II, 1974	2:47
16.	"We Will Rock You"	May	News of the World, 1977	2:01
17.	"We Are the Champions"	Mercury	News of the World	3:02
18.	"Teo Torriatte (Let Us Cling Together)" (Bonus Track for Japan)	May	A Day at the Races	5:05
Total length:				1:03:08

Disc two: Greatest Hits II (1991)
No.	Title	Writer(s)	Original album	Length
1.	"A Kind of Magic"	Roger Taylor	A Kind of Magic, 1986	4:22
2.	"Under Pressure" (With David Bowie) (Edited Version)	Queen, David Bowie	Hot Space, 1982	3:56
3.	"Radio Ga Ga"	Taylor	The Works, 1984	5:43
4.	"I Want It All" (Single Version)	Brian May	The Miracle, 1989	4:01
5.	"I Want to Break Free" (Single Version)	Deacon	The Works	4:18
6.	"Innuendo"	Taylor, Mercury	Innuendo, 1991	6:27
7.	"It's a Hard Life"	Mercury	The Works	4:09
8.	"Breakthru"	Taylor, Mercury	The Miracle	4:09
9.	"Who Wants to Live Forever" (Edited Version)	May	A Kind of Magic	4:57
10.	"Headlong" (Original Innuendo LP Edit)	May	Innuendo	4:33
11.	"The Miracle"	Mercury, Deacon	The Miracle	4:54
12.	"I'm Going Slightly Mad" (Original Innuendo LP Edit)	Mercury, Peter Straker	Innuendo	4:07
13.	"The Invisible Man"	Taylor	The Miracle	3:58
14.	"Hammer to Fall" (Single Version)	May	The Works	3:40
15.	"Friends Will Be Friends"	Mercury, Deacon	A Kind of Magic	4:07
16.	"The Show Must Go On" (Early Fade-Out)	May	Innuendo	4:23
17.	"One Vision" (Single Version)	May, Taylor	A Kind of Magic	4:04
18.	"I Was Born to Love You" (Bonus Track for Japan)	Mercury	Made in Heaven, 1995	4:50
Total length:				1:20:38

Disc three: Greatest Hits III (1999)
No.	Title	Writer(s)	Original album	Length
1.	"The Show Must Go On" (Live at Théâtre National de Chaillot in Paris, France, With Elton John)	May		4:35
2.	"Under Pressure" (With David Bowie) (Rah Mix)	Deacon, Mercury, Bowie		4:08
3.	"Barcelona" (Single Version) (Performed by Freddie Mercury and Montserrat Caballé)	Mercury, Mike Moran	Barcelona, 1988	4:25
4.	"Too Much Love Will Kill You"	May, Frank Musker, Elizabeth Lamers	Made in Heaven	4:18
5.	"Somebody to Love" (Live at Wembley Stadium with George Michael, The Freddie Mercury Tribute Concert, 20 April 1992)	Mercury	Five Live EP, 1993	5:07
6.	"You Don't Fool Me"	Taylor, Mercury	Made in Heaven	5:22
7.	"Heaven for Everyone" (Single Version)	Taylor	Made in Heaven	4:37
8.	"Las Palabras de Amor (The Words of Love)"	May	Hot Space	4:29
9.	"Driven by You" (Performed by Brian May)	May	Back to the Light, 1992	4:09
10.	"Living on My Own" (Julian Raymond Album Mix) (Performed by Freddie Mercury)	Mercury	Remix from The Freddie Mercury Album, 1992, Original Version on Mr. Bad Guy, 1985	3:37
11.	"Let Me Live"	Taylor, Mercury	Made in Heaven	4:45
12.	"The Great Pretender" (The Platters Cover) (Performed by Freddie Mercury)	Buck Ram	Non-Album Single, 1987, Later released on The Freddie Mercury Album	3:26
13.	"Princes of the Universe"	Mercury	A Kind of Magic	3:31
14.	"Another One Bites the Dust" (With additional vocals from Wyclef Jean, Pras, Free & Canibus)	Deacon	Small Soldiers soundtrack, 1998	4:20
15.	"No-One but You (Only the Good Die Young)"	May	Queen Rocks, 1997	4:11
16.	"These Are the Days of Our Lives"	Taylor	Innuendo	4:22
17.	"Thank God It's Christmas"	Taylor, May	non-album Christmas single, 1984	4:19
Total length:				1:13:41

== Charts ==
=== Weekly charts ===
Weekly chart performance for The Platinum Collection by Queen
Chart (2001)	Peak position
Dutch Albums (Album Top 100)	5

Chart (2002)	Peak position
Belgian Albums (Ultratop Flanders)	10
Irish Albums (IRMA)	2
UK Albums (Official Charts)	2
US Billboard 200	48

Chart (2003)	Peak position
Danish Albums (Hitlisten)	10
Norwegian Albums (VG-lista)	2

Chart (2005)	Peak position
French Compilations (SNEP)	13

Chart (2008)	Peak position
Swedish Albums (Sverigetopplistan)	4

Chart (2011)	Peak position
Finnish Albums (Suomen virallinen lista)	14
Spanish Albums (Promusicae)	28

Chart (2012)	Peak position
Belgian Albums (Ultratop Wallonia)	3
French Albums (SNEP)	112

Chart (2018–19)	Peak position
Australian Albums (ARIA)	4
Austrian Albums (Ö3 Austria)	3
Canadian Albums (Billboard)	6
German Albums (Offizielle Top 100)	5
Hungarian Albums (MAHASZ)	9
Italian Albums (FIMI)	3
New Zealand Albums (RMNZ)	7
Polish Albums (ZPAV)	1
Portuguese Albums (AFP)	1
Scottish Albums (Official Charts)	8
Swiss Albums (Schweizer Hitparade)	2
UK Albums (Official Charts)	8
US Billboard 200	6
US Top Rock Albums (Billboard)	1

Chart (2024)	Peak position
Greek Albums (IFPI)	34

=== Year-end charts ===
Year-end chart performance for The Platinum Collection by Queen
Chart (2001)	Position
Dutch Albums (Album Top 100)	52

Chart (2002)	Position
Belgian Albums (Ultratop Flanders)	53
Canadian Metal Albums (Nielsen SoundScan)	72
Dutch Albums (Album Top 100)	43
UK Albums (OCC)	14

Chart (2003)	Position
UK Albums (OCC)	64

Chart (2004)	Position
Belgian Albums (Ultratop Flanders)	87
UK Albums (OCC)	81

Chart (2005)	Position
Dutch Albums (Album Top 100)	39

Chart (2011)	Position
Belgian Albums (Ultratop Wallonia)	54

Chart (2012)	Position
Belgian Albums (Ultratop Flanders)	52
Belgian Albums (Ultratop Wallonia)	28

Chart (2013)	Position
Belgian Albums (Ultratop Flanders)	96
Belgian Albums (Ultratop Wallonia)	138

Chart (2014)	Position
Belgian Albums (Ultratop Flanders)	165
Belgian Albums (Ultratop Wallonia)	137

Chart (2015)	Position
Belgian Albums (Ultratop Flanders)	154
Belgian Albums (Ultratop Wallonia)	134

Chart (2016)	Position
Belgian Albums (Ultratop Flanders)	133
Belgian Albums (Ultratop Wallonia)	127

Chart (2018)	Position
Polish Albums (ZPAV)	6
South Korean International Albums (Gaon)	2
UK Albums (OCC)	24
US Top Rock Albums (Billboard)	42

Chart (2019)	Position
Australian Albums (ARIA)	18
Austrian Albums (Ö3 Austria)	19
Belgian Albums (Ultratop Flanders)	52
Belgian Albums (Ultratop Wallonia)	18
Italian Albums (FIMI)	13
New Zealand Albums (RMNZ)	39
Polish Albums (ZPAV)	8
Swiss Albums (Schweizer Hitparade)	7
UK Albums (OCC)	17
US Billboard 200	80
US Top Rock Albums (Billboard)	10

Chart (2020)	Position
Austrian Albums (Ö3 Austria)	47
Belgian Albums (Ultratop Wallonia)	147
German Albums (Offizielle Top 100)	48
Polish Albums (ZPAV)	48
Swiss Albums (Schweizer Hitparade)	67
UK Albums (OCC)	54

Chart (2021)	Position
German Albums (Offizielle Top 100)	99
Swiss Albums (Schweizer Hitparade)	71

== Certifications ==
Region	Certification	Certified units/sales
Australia (ARIA)	2× Platinum	140,000^{‡}
Belgium (BRMA)	Platinum	50,000^{*}
Denmark (IFPI Danmark)	Platinum	20,000^{‡}
Finland (Musiikkituottajat)	Gold	15,623
France (SNEP)	2× Platinum	200,000^{‡}
Germany (BVMI)	Platinum	300,000^{‡}
Italy (FIMI) sales since 2009	4× Platinum	200,000^{‡}
Netherlands (NVPI)	2× Platinum	160,000^{^}
New Zealand (RMNZ)	Platinum	15,000^{^}
Norway (IFPI Norway)	Platinum	50,000^{*}
Poland (ZPAV)	Diamond	100,000^{‡}
Portugal (AFP)	Platinum	40,000^{^}
South Korea (Gaon Chart)	—	11,805
Spain (Promusicae)	2× Platinum	200,000^{^}
Switzerland (IFPI Switzerland)	Gold	25,000^{^}
United Kingdom (BPI)	8× Platinum	2,400,000^{‡}
United States (RIAA)	5× Platinum	1,666,665^{^}
Summaries
Europe (IFPI)	3× Platinum	3,000,000^{*}
^{*} Sales figures based on certification alone.^{^} Shipments figures based on certification alone.^{‡} Sales+streaming figures based on certification alone.
