= Queen Forever =

Compilation album by Queen
- Released: 10 November 2014
- Recorded: 1973–2014
- Studio: Allerton Hill and the Priory
- Genre: Rock
- Length: 75:03 (standard edition); 63:03 (deluxe edition disc 1); 71:41 (deluxe edition disc 2); 134:44 (deluxe edition total)
- Label: Virgin EMI; Hollywood
- Producer: Queen, William Orbit

Queen chronology
Live at the Rainbow '74 (2014)	Queen Forever (2014)	A Night at the Odeon – Hammersmith 1975 (2015)

Singles from Queen Forever
- 1. "Love Kills - the Ballad" Released: 26 September 2014; 2. "Let Me in Your Heart Again (William Orbit mix)" Released: 3 November 2014

Queen Forever is a compilation album by the British rock band Queen. Released on 10 November 2014, it features tracks the band had "forgotten about" with vocals from original lead singer Freddie Mercury. Queen's bassist John Deacon is also on the tracks.

Drummer Roger Taylor spoke about the album in December 2013, stating that he and guitarist Brian May were "getting together...in the new year to finish what we've got there and then we're going to fashion some kind of album". May announced the title as a compilation album in a radio interview on BBC Radio Wales on 23 May 2014 at the Hay Festival. It is the first Queen album to feature unreleased material from Mercury (who died from complications related to AIDS on 24 November 1991) since the 1995 album Made in Heaven and Deacon (who retired from the music business in 1997) since the 1997 compilation album Queen Rocks. The album was released by Hollywood Records in the United States on 10 November 2014.

== Material ==
Brian May said most of the material "comes from the 80s, when we were in full flight. It is quite emotional. It is the big, big ballads and the big, big epic sound." He has compared it to Made in Heaven. May had earlier stated that the album may end up being a mixture of old existing material and new material containing at least three unreleased songs, later stating possibly as many as five. The material has been fleshed out with modern technology by May.

"It is a rather odd mixture of our slower stuff," complained Roger Taylor. "I didn't want the double album version they've put out. It's an awful lot for people to take in, and it's bloody miserable. I wouldn't call it an album, either. It's a compilation with three new tracks. It's more of a record company confection. It's not a full-blooded Queen album."

== Songs ==
=== "Let Me in Your Heart Again" ===
Originating from sessions for the band's 1984 album The Works, "Let Me in Your Heart Again" was written by May and originally recorded in Los Angeles in 1983. Speaking on The Chris Evans Breakfast Show in September 2014, May revealed that the band had initially found it impossible to complete the track and that several different versions of the lyrics were written to make it easier for Mercury to sing. They abandoned the song, but it was eventually recorded by May's wife Anita Dobson (with May on guitar) and released on her 1988 studio album Talking of Love (Dobson reportedly used the Queen version(s) as a guide vocal). In preparing the track for Queen Forever, May stitched together parts from each of the existing Queen versions, before he and Taylor fleshed out the music track. Consequently, the final studio version contains very different lyrics from the Dobson version.

An alternative remix by William Orbit was released in November 2014 as a single in the UK to raise money for Product Red, an initiative founded in 2006 by U2 lead singer Bono for the purpose of engaging the private sector in raising awareness and funds to help eliminate HIV/AIDS in Africa.

=== "Love Kills" ===
It was stated by Adam Lambert at the start of the 2014 Queen + Adam Lambert Tour of North America that "Love Kills", Mercury's debut solo single from 1984, had been reworked by the band for inclusion on Queen Forever. The band then proceeded to play a stripped down ballad version of the track (the original version was noted for its heavily synthesized, disco-esque style).

Queen had previously reworked Mercury's solo recordings into Queen songs for their 1995 album, Made in Heaven. On that occasion, they had used his songs "Made in Heaven" and "I Was Born to Love You", as well as the unreleased solo recording "It's a Beautiful Day". When it became apparent that there was not enough quality unreleased Queen material to make a new full studio album, May and Taylor decided to utilise the same tactics.

Written by Mercury and Giorgio Moroder, "Love Kills" was originally recorded for the band's 1984 studio album The Works, but was ultimately rejected. It was then reworked as a Mercury solo track for inclusion in Moroder's 1984 restoration and edit of the 1927 silent film Metropolis. In 1985, the film was nominated at the 5th Golden Raspberry Awards for Worst Musical Score, and the song itself was nominated for Worst Original Song. Nevertheless, the single reached number ten on the UK Singles Chart.

Despite being released as a Freddie Mercury solo single, all four members of Queen appeared on the original release.

Speaking on The Chris Evans Breakfast Show, May revealed that he had always wanted to turn the song into a ballad, but had never done so before Mercury's death. The new version is led by May's lead guitar, rather than Mercury's original synthesizers. May also plays bass guitar on the track, supplemented by Deacon's additional electric guitar as taken from the original source tapes.

=== "There Must Be More to Life Than This" ===
In the early 1980s, Mercury recorded three songs as duets with Michael Jackson, of which "There Must Be More to Life Than This", written by Mercury, was one. The sessions eventually fell apart and ended, and the material was never released (although Mercury stated several times he hoped they would find the time to finish the tracks).

Queen eventually recorded a version of the song in 1981 during sessions for their 1982 studio album Hot Space, but it was ultimately left off the record. Mercury later went on to re-record "There Must Be More to Life Than This" for his solo album Mr. Bad Guy (1985), while Jackson recorded one of the other songs, "State of Shock", with his family band the Jacksons, with Mick Jagger of The Rolling Stones singing Mercury's parts (the song was released as a single in 1984, and later featured on the Jacksons' seventeenth studio album Victory, also released in 1984; this album's title was also that of the third Mercury/Jackson duet, but has itself never been released).

After Jackson's death in 2009, May and Taylor made steps to secure the release of the duets, with a view to a 2012 release. However, according to Taylor, working with the Jackson estate was like "wading through glue". Ultimately, the parties were only able to reach an agreement for this one of the three tracks to be released.

The version released on Queen Forever was produced and mixed by William Orbit, containing the original 1981 backing track recorded during the Hot Space sessions, and features Deacon on bass guitar. An alternative mix made by May exists, but was rejected by the Jackson estate in favour of the Orbit mix.

=== Other material ===
The rest of the album consists of previously released Queen songs. Rather than simply being the "greatest hits", however, the tracks are mostly deeper cuts personally chosen by Taylor and May. The songs were selected to loosely follow the concept of an album centred around the theme of "love".

== Critical reception ==
Professional ratings
Aggregate scores
Source	Rating
Metacritic	49/100
Review scores
Source	Rating
AllMusic	2.5/5 stars
Classic Rock (de)	8/10
The Daily Telegraph	2/5 stars
Drowned in Sound	5/10
The Guardian	3/5 stars
Rolling Stone (DE)	3.5/5 stars
State	3/5 stars

Upon release, Queen Forever received mixed reviews from critics who thought there was no reason for fans of the band to purchase an album with songs that have been released many times in other Queen compilation albums. Thomas Erlewine gave a two-and-a-half star review in AllMusic, saying: "The hardcore fans might notice the difference but, apart from those three songs, there's not much reason for them to pick this up because Forever consists of songs they've purchased many times over."

== Track listing ==
=== CD standard edition ===
No.	Title	Writer(s)	Original album	Length
1.	"Let Me in Your Heart Again"	Brian May	New song; original version from Anita Dobson's Talking of Love	4:31
2.	"Love Kills" (The Ballad)	Freddie Mercury, Giorgio Moroder	New song; original version from Giorgio Moroder's Metropolis Soundtrack	4:12
3.	"There Must Be More to Life Than This" (with Michael Jackson)	Mercury	New song; original version from Freddie Mercury's Mr. Bad Guy	3:20
4.	"It's a Hard Life"	Mercury	The Works	4:06
5.	"You're My Best Friend"	John Deacon	A Night at the Opera	2:52
6.	"Love of My Life" (early fade-out)	Mercury	A Night at the Opera	3:33
7.	"Drowse" (early fade-out)	Roger Taylor	A Day at the Races	3:38
8.	"Long Away"	May	A Day at the Races	3:32
9.	"Lily of the Valley" (single version)	Mercury	Sheer Heart Attack	1:39
10.	"Don't Try So Hard"	Mercury	Innuendo	3:39
11.	"Bijou"	May, Mercury	Innuendo	3:36
12.	"These Are the Days of Our Lives"	Taylor	Innuendo	4:14
13.	"Las Palabras de Amor (The Words of Love)"	May	Hot Space	4:31
14.	"Who Wants to Live Forever"	May	A Kind of Magic	5:15
15.	"A Winter's Tale"	Mercury	Made in Heaven	3:48
16.	"Play the Game" (without synthesizer intro)	Mercury	The Game	3:14
17.	"Save Me"	May	The Game	3:46
18.	"Somebody to Love" (early fade-out)	Mercury	A Day at the Races	4:52
19.	"Too Much Love Will Kill You"	May, Frank Musker, Elizabeth Lamers	Brian May's Back to the Light and Made in Heaven	4:19
20.	"Crazy Little Thing Called Love"	Mercury	The Game	2:43
Total length:				75:03

Japanese bonus track
No.	Title	Writer(s)	Original album	Length
21.	"I Was Born to Love You"	Mercury	Mr. Bad Guy and Made in Heaven	4:49
Total length:				79:52

=== CD deluxe edition ===
Disc 1
No.	Title	Writer(s)	Original album	Length
1.	"Let Me in Your Heart Again"	May	Talking of Love	4:31
2.	"Love Kills" (The Ballad)	Mercury, Moroder	Metropolis Soundtrack	4:12
3.	"There Must Be More to Life Than This" (with Michael Jackson)	Mercury	Mr. Bad Guy	3:20
4.	"Play the Game" (without synthesizer intro)	Mercury	The Game	3:14
5.	"Dear Friends"	May	Sheer Heart Attack	1:08
6.	"You're My Best Friend"	Deacon	A Night at the Opera	2:52
7.	"Love of My Life" (early fade-out)	Mercury	A Night at the Opera	3:33
8.	"Drowse" (early fade-out)	Taylor	A Day at the Races	3:38
9.	"You Take My Breath Away" (without vocal reprise ending)	Mercury	A Day at the Races	4:38
10.	"Spread Your Wings" (early fade-out)	Deacon	News of the World	4:30
11.	"Long Away"	May	A Day at the Races	3:32
12.	"Lily of the Valley" (single version)	Mercury	Sheer Heart Attack	1:39
13.	"Don't Try So Hard"	Mercury	Innuendo	3:39
14.	"Bijou"	May, Mercury	Innuendo	3:36
15.	"These Are the Days of Our Lives"	Taylor	Innuendo	4:14
16.	"Nevermore" (slight edit)	Mercury	Queen II	1:18
17.	"Las Palabras de Amor (The Words of Love)"	May	Hot Space	4:31
18.	"Who Wants to Live Forever"	May	A Kind of Magic	5:15
Total length:				63:03

Disc 2
No.	Title	Writer(s)	Original album	Length
1.	"I Was Born to Love You"	Mercury	Mr. Bad Guy and Made in Heaven	4:49
2.	"Somebody to Love" (early fade-out)	Mercury	A Day at the Races	4:52
3.	"Crazy Little Thing Called Love"	Mercury	The Game	2:43
4.	"Friends Will Be Friends"	Mercury, Deacon	A Kind of Magic	4:06
5.	"Jealousy"	Mercury	Jazz	3:13
6.	"One Year of Love"	Deacon	A Kind of Magic	4:27
7.	"A Winter's Tale"	Mercury	Made in Heaven	3:48
8.	"'39"	May	A Night at the Opera	3:30
9.	"Mother Love"	May, Mercury	Made in Heaven	4:47
10.	"It's a Hard Life"	Mercury	The Works	4:06
11.	"Save Me"	May	The Game	3:46
12.	"Made in Heaven"	Mercury	Mr. Bad Guy and Made in Heaven	5:25
13.	"Too Much Love Will Kill You"	May, Musker, Lamers	Back to the Light and Made in Heaven	4:19
14.	"Sail Away Sweet Sister"	May	The Game	3:33
15.	"The Miracle" (Greatest Hits II edit)	Mercury, Deacon	The Miracle	4:57
16.	"Is This the World We Created...?"	Mercury, May	The Works	2:12
17.	"In the Lap of the Gods... Revisited"	Mercury	Sheer Heart Attack	3:46
18.	"Forever" (piano version of "Who Wants to Live Forever")	May	A Kind of Magic	3:21
Total length:				71:41

Japanese bonus track
No.	Title	Writer(s)	Original album	Length
19.	"Teo Torriatte (Let Us Cling Together)"	May	A Day at the Races	5:08
Total length:				76:49

=== Vinyl edition ===
On 18 February 2015, it was announced that Queen Forever would be released in a 4-LP box set featuring all the tracks on the deluxe edition and a bonus 12" single featuring "Let Me in Your Heart Again (William Orbit Mix)".

Record 1 / Side A
No.	Title	Writer(s)	Length
1.	"Let Me in Your Heart Again"	Brian May	4:31
2.	"Love Kills"	Freddie Mercury, Giorgio Moroder	4:12
3.	"There Must Be More to Life Than This" (William Orbit mix)	Mercury	3:20
4.	"Play the Game"	Mercury	3:14
5.	"Dear Friends"	May	1:08
Total length:			16:25

Record 1 / Side B
No.	Title	Writer(s)	Length
1.	"You’re My Best Friend"	John Deacon	2:52
2.	"Love of My Life"	Mercury	3:33
3.	"Drowse"	Roger Taylor	3:38
4.	"You Take My Breath Away"	Mercury	4:38
5.	"Spread Your Wings"	Deacon	4:30
Total length:			19:11

Record 2 / Side A
No.	Title	Writer(s)	Length
1.	"Long Away"	May	3:32
2.	"Lily of the Valley"	Mercury	1:39
3.	"Don’t Try So Hard"	Queen (Mercury)	3:39
4.	"Bijou"	Queen (Mercury/May)	3:36
5.	"These Are the Days of Our Lives"	Queen (Taylor)	4:14
Total length:			16:40

Record 2 / Side B
No.	Title	Writer(s)	Length
1.	"Nevermore"	Mercury	1:18
2.	"Las Palabras de Amor (The Words of Love)"	May	4:31
3.	"Who Wants to Live Forever"	May	5:15
4.	"I Was Born to Love You"	Mercury	4:49
Total length:			15:53

Record 3 / Side A
No.	Title	Writer(s)	Length
1.	"Somebody to Love"	Mercury	4:52
2.	"Crazy Little Thing Called Love"	Mercury	2:43
3.	"Friends Will Be Friends"	Mercury/Deacon	4:06
4.	"Jealousy"	Mercury	3:13
Total length:			14:54

Record 3 / Side B
No.	Title	Writer(s)	Length
1.	"One Year of Love"	Deacon	4:27
2.	"A Winter’s Tale"	Queen (Mercury)	3:48
3.	"'39"	May	3:30
4.	"Mother Love"	Mercury/May	4:47
Total length:			16:32

Record 4 / Side A
No.	Title	Writer(s)	Length
1.	"It's a Hard Life"	Mercury	4:06
2.	"Save Me"	May	3:46
3.	"Made in Heaven"	Mercury	5:25
4.	"Too Much Love Will Kill You"	May/Frank Musker/Elizabeth Lamers	4:20
Total length:			17:37

Record 4 / Side B
No.	Title	Writer(s)	Length
1.	"Sail Away Sweet Sister"	May	3:33
2.	"The Miracle"	Queen	4:57
3.	"Is This the World We Created...?"	Mercury/May	2:12
4.	"In the Lap of the Gods... Revisited"	Mercury	3:46
5.	"Forever"	May	3:21
Total length:			17:49

Bonus 12" single
No.	Title	Writer(s)	Length
1.	"Let Me in Your Heart Again" (William Orbit mix)	May	6:42

On Side B of the bonus 12" single, there is a "Queen Forever" etching.

== Personnel ==
Queen

- Freddie Mercury – lead vocals, piano, keyboards, acoustic guitar on "Crazy Little Thing Called Love"
- Brian May – acoustic and electric guitars, backing vocals, piano, keyboards, lead vocals on "Long Away", "'39" and "Sail Away Sweet Sister", co-lead vocals on "Las Palabras de Amor", "Who Wants to Live Forever" and "Mother Love", bass guitar on "Love Kills"
- Roger Taylor – drums, backing vocals, keyboards, lead vocals and rhythm guitar on "Drowse"
- John Deacon – bass guitar, acoustic guitars, keyboards, additional electric guitar on "Love Kills"

Additional musicians

- Michael Jackson – co-lead vocals on "There Must Be More to Life Than This"
- Fred Mandel – piano on "Let Me in Your Heart Again"

== Charts ==
=== Weekly charts ===
Weekly chart performance for Queen Forever
Chart (2014–2022)	Peak position
Australian Albums (ARIA)	35
Austrian Albums (Ö3 Austria)	8
Belgian Albums (Ultratop Flanders)	6
Belgian Albums (Ultratop Wallonia)	8
Canadian Albums (Billboard)	11
Czech Albums (ČNS IFPI)	8
Danish Albums (Hitlisten)	15
Dutch Albums (Album Top 100)	3
Norwegian Albums (VG-lista)	11
Finnish Albums (Suomen virallinen lista)	36
French Albums (SNEP)	12
German Albums (Offizielle Top 100)	7
Irish Albums (IRMA)	18
Israeli Albums Chart	4
Italian Albums (FIMI)	5
Japanese Albums (Oricon)	16
South Korean International Albums (Circle)	2
New Zealand Albums (RMNZ)	18
Polish Albums (ZPAV)	2
Portuguese Albums (AFP)	12
Scottish Albums (OCC)	6
Spanish Albums (Promusicae)	8
Swedish Albums (Sverigetopplistan)	28
Swiss Albums (Schweizer Hitparade)	4
UK Albums (OCC)	5
US Billboard 200	38
US Top Rock Albums (Billboard)	11
US Top Hard Rock Albums (Billboard)	4

=== Year-end charts ===
2014 year-end chart performance for Queen Forever
Chart (2014)	Position
Belgian Albums (Ultratop Flanders)	106
Belgian Albums (Ultratop Wallonia)	98
Dutch Albums (MegaCharts)	62
French Albums (SNEP)	140
Italian Albums (FIMI)	42
UK Albums (OCC)	50

2015 year-end chart performance for Queen Forever
Chart (2015)	Position
Belgian Albums (Ultratop Flanders)	121
Belgian Albums (Ultratop Wallonia)	99
Spanish Albums (PROMUSICAE)	87

== Certifications ==
Certifications for Queen Forever
Region	Certification	Certified units/sales
Germany (BVMI)	Gold	100,000^{‡}
Italy (FIMI)	Gold	25,000^{*}
Poland (ZPAV)	Gold	10,000^{‡}
United Kingdom (BPI)	Gold	100,000^{*}
^{*} Sales figures based on certification alone.^{‡} Sales+streaming figures based on certification alone.
