= Mother Love =

Mother Love may refer to:

- Mother Love (entertainer), an American entertainer
- "Mother Love" (song), a song by the British rock band Queen
- Mother Love (TV series), a British television drama
- Mother Love (1916 film), a British silent film
- Mother Love (1938 film), a French comedy drama film
- "Mother Love" (Doctors), a 2003 television episode

== See also ==
- A Mother's Love (disambiguation)
- Love, Mother, a 1987 Hungarian drama film
