= Pride (Japanese TV series) =

- Genre: drama, romance, sport
- Written by: Shinji Nojima
- Directed by: Isamu Nakae; Kensaku Sawada; Hideki Hirai
- Starring: Takuya Kimura; Yūko Takeuchi
- Opening theme: "I Was Born to Love You" by Queen
- Composer: Ryō Yoshimata
- Country of origin: Japan
- Original language: Japanese
- No. of episodes: 11

Production
- Producers: Atsuhiro Sugio; Tadashi Makino
- Running time: approx. 0:46

Original release
- Network: Fuji TV
- Release: 12 January – 22 March 2004

Pride (プライド, Puraido) is a Japanese drama series premiered on Fuji TV in 2004. Takuya Kimura played the lead role.

== Cast ==
- Takuya Kimura as Haru Satonaka
- Yūko Takeuchi as Aki Murase
- Kenji Sakaguchi as Yamato Hotta
- Noriko Nakagoshi as Yuri Aizawa
- Ryuta Sato as Makoto Shimamura
- MEGUMI as Chika Ishikawa
- Somegoro Ichikawa as Tomonori Ikegami
- Saori Takizawa as Saeko Sonoda
- Kōichi Satō as Yuichiro Hyodo
- Saburō Tokitō as Kengo Anzai
- Yuriko Ishida as Yoko

== Basic plot ==
The show revolves around a corporate ice hockey team, the Blue Scorpions. The main character is Haru Satonaka (spelled Halu in the show), the captain of the team. Other team members are Yamato Hotta (the goalie), Makoto Shimamura (the rookie) and Tomonori Ikegami. In the first episode, we learn that Haru idolizes their coach, Anzai, who was a former hockey player. When he dies from an illness by the end of the first episode, Haru puts it upon himself to take care of his coach's widow, Yoko, and their young son, Wataru. The introduction of the team's new coach (Yuichiro Hyodo) does not go well, as Haru refuses to conform to the new methods, especially after Hyodo insults Ansai's way of coaching. This sets up a very antagonistic relationship between the two men. Aside from the hockey, another aspect of the show is the members' love life. Haru treats his relationships as games, refusing to fall in love. This is probably a result of his promise to Anzai to remain an "iceman", believing that a relationship, especially if children were born, would have a negative effect on his game. He believes he's found the perfect solution by starting a relationship with Aki Murase, an office lady from his team's corporation. Their "contracted" relationship is a game, as she is waiting for the return of her architect boyfriend in New York. However, she hasn't heard from him in 2 years, and she knows the relationship is over. Still, she goes every Sunday to a bridge to wait for him.

Yamato is in a conflicted relationship with Yuri Aizawa, a friend and fellow office lady of Aki. She is a self-confessed gold-digger, vowing never to live the same difficult life as her poor single mother. She believes that Yamato is from a rich family, as he was driving Tomo's car the night they met. He tries to tell her the truth, but she thinks he's only joking. He doesn't want to be in a relationship built on a lie.

Tomo is the playboy on the team. After finding out that he was the product of an affair, he rebelled, constantly throwing away the money his rich father gives him on friends and women. Usually staying with one night stands, he finds a possible partner in Chika Ishikawa, yet another of Aki's friends and co-workers.

== Theme songs ==
- "I Was Born to Love You" by Queen as opening theme.

Almost all of the songs in this drama were by Queen. "Bohemian Rhapsody", "We Will Rock You", "We Are the Champions", "Radio Ga Ga", "Too Much Love Will Kill You", "Let Me Live","Fat Bottom Girls" etc. were used in this drama.

== Ratings ==
In the tables below, the blue numbers represent the lowest ratings and the red numbers represent the highest ratings.

Episode #	Original broadcast date	Kanto region
1	January 12, 2004	28.0%
2	January 19, 2004	25.1%
3	January 26, 2004	24.6%
4	February 2, 2004	23.6%
5	February 9, 2004	23.4%
6	February 16, 2004	22.8%
7	February 23, 2004	22.6%
8	March 1, 2004	26.0%
9	March 8, 2004	24.1%
10	March 15, 2004	24.9%
11	March 22, 2004	28.8%
Average		25.1%

Preceded by Beginner; 6 October 2003 – 15 December 2003	Fuji TV Getsuku Drama; Mondays 21:00 – 21:54 (JST)	Succeeded by Itoshi Kimi e 19 April 2004 – 28 June 2004
