= Greatest Hits III (Queen album) =

Greatest hits album by Queen
- Released: 8 November 1999
- Recorded: 1980–1998
- Studio: Various
- Genre: Rock
- Length: 73:41
- Label: Parlophone; Hollywood
- Producer: Queen

Queen chronology
The Crown Jewels (1998)	Greatest Hits III (1999)	The Platinum Collection (2000)

Singles from Greatest Hits III
- 1. "Another One Bites the Dust (Small Soldiers Remix)" Released: 27 October 1998; 2. "Under Pressure (Rah Mix)" Released: 6 December 1999; 3. "Princes of the Universe" Released: 23 May 2000 (NL only)

Professional ratings
Review scores
Source	Rating
AllMusic	2.5/5 stars
Chester Chronicle	(Positive)
Classic Rock	(Positive)
The Rolling Stone Album Guide	1/5 stars

Greatest Hits III is a compilation album by British rock band Queen. It is a compilation of latter-day songs, the band members' solo hits and the band's collaborations with other artists (hence the album's credit to "Queen+"). It was released on 8 November 1999. The first two tracks on the album were new previously unreleased versions of classic Queen songs.

The album includes "These Are the Days of Our Lives" (1991), which was Freddie Mercury's last appearance in a music video, and "No-One but You (Only the Good Die Young)" (1997), a song dedicated to Mercury which also features the last recording of bass guitarist John Deacon before his retirement. Four songs from their last studio album Made in Heaven (1995) also feature in the compilation, including "Too Much Love Will Kill You" and "Heaven for Everyone". A home video was also released in the EU and in North America but has since been long out of print, called Greatest Flix III. The album was remastered in 2000 as part of the "Platinum Collection" 3-CD set, as well as again in 2011 in celebrating the band's 40th Anniversary with updated cover art (in light blue instead of plain white like in the original design), with a limited run of super jewel case edition.

== Track listing ==
Greatest Hits III track listing
No.	Title	Writer(s)	Original album	Length
1.	"The Show Must Go On" (live at Théâtre National de Chaillot in Paris, France with Elton John)	Queen	Previously unreleased (originally from Innuendo, 1991)	4:35
2.	"Under Pressure" (with David Bowie; Rah mix)	Queen, David Bowie	Original version from Hot Space, 1982	4:08
3.	"Barcelona" (single version; performed by Freddie Mercury and Montserrat Caballé)	Freddie Mercury, Mike Moran	Barcelona, 1988	4:25
4.	"Too Much Love Will Kill You"	Brian May, Frank Musker, Elizabeth Lamers	Made in Heaven, 1995	4:18
5.	"Somebody to Love" (The Freddie Mercury Tribute Concert, live at Wembley Stadium with George Michael, 20 April 1992)	Mercury	Five Live EP, 1993 (originally from A Day at the Races, 1976)	5:07
6.	"You Don't Fool Me"	Queen	Made in Heaven	5:22
7.	"Heaven for Everyone" (single version)	Roger Taylor	Made in Heaven	4:37
8.	"Las Palabras de Amor"	May	Hot Space	4:29
9.	"Driven by You" (performed by Brian May)	May	Back to the Light, 1992	4:09
10.	"Living on My Own" (Julian Raymond album mix; performed by Freddie Mercury)	Mercury	Remix from The Freddie Mercury Album, 1992 (original version on Mr. Bad Guy, 1985)	3:37
11.	"Let Me Live"	Queen	Made in Heaven	4:45
12.	"The Great Pretender" (The Platters cover; performed by Freddie Mercury)	Buck Ram	Non-album single, 1987 (later released on The Freddie Mercury Album)	3:26
13.	"Princes of the Universe"	Mercury	A Kind of Magic, 1986	3:31
14.	"Another One Bites the Dust" (with additional vocals and rapping from Wyclef Jean, Pras and Free)	John Deacon	Small Soldiers soundtrack, 1998	4:20
15.	"No-One but You (Only the Good Die Young)"	May	Queen Rocks, 1997	4:11
16.	"These Are the Days of Our Lives"	Queen	Innuendo	4:22
17.	"Thank God It's Christmas"	Taylor, May	Non-album Christmas single, 1984	4:19

== Personnel ==
Main

- Queen – producers (2, 4–8, 11, 13, 15–17)
- Brian May – producer (9), remixing (2)
- Freddie Mercury – producer (3, 12), original recording producer (10)
- Roger Taylor – remixing (2)
- David Bowie – producer (2)
- Wyclef Jean – remixing (14)
- Mack – producer (8, 13, 17), original recording producer (10)
- George Michael – producer (5)

Additional

- Joshua J. Macrae – producer (6–7, 11), recording engineer (11, 15), additional remixing (2)
- Mike Moran – producer (3, 12)
- Colin Peter – producer, recording engineer (10)
- Serge Ramaekers – producer, recording engineer (10)
- Julian Raymond – additional production (10)
- David Richards – producer (3–4, 6–7, 9, 12, 16), recording engineer (5)
- Justin Shirley-Smith – producer (6–7, 11), recording engineer (1, 11, 15), additional remixing (2)
- Carl Ward – producer, recording engineer (10)

== Charts ==
Chart performance for Greatest Hits III
Chart (1999)	Peak position
Australian Albums (ARIA)	77
Austrian Albums (Ö3 Austria)	2
Belgian Albums (Ultratop Flanders)	7
Danish Albums (Hitlisten)	5
Dutch Albums (Album Top 100)	8
Finnish Albums (Suomen virallinen lista)	35
French Compilations (SNEP)	9
German Albums (Offizielle Top 100)	5
Hungarian Albums (MAHASZ)	7
New Zealand Albums (RMNZ)	24
Norwegian Albums (VG-lista)	5
Scottish Albums (OCC)	11
Swedish Albums (Sverigetopplistan)	19
Swiss Albums (Schweizer Hitparade)	4
UK Albums (OCC)	5

2000 chart performance for Greatest Hits III
Chart (2000)	Peak position
Belgian Albums (Ultratop Wallonia)	7
Irish Albums (IRMA)	46
Italian Albums (FIMI)	7

2008 chart performance for Greatest Hits III
Chart (2008)	Peak position
Spanish Albums (Promusicae)	89

== Certifications ==
Certifications for Greatest Hits III
Region	Certification	Certified units/sales
Argentina (CAPIF)	Platinum	60,000^{^}
Austria (IFPI Austria)	Gold	25,000^{*}
Belgium (BRMA)	Gold	25,000^{*}
Denmark (IFPI Danmark)	Platinum	50,000^{^}
Germany (BVMI)	Gold	150,000^{^}
Norway (IFPI Norway)	Platinum	50,000^{*}
Spain (Promusicae)	Gold	50,000^{^}
Sweden (GLF)	Gold	40,000^{^}
Switzerland (IFPI Switzerland)	Gold	25,000^{^}
United Kingdom (BPI)	2× Platinum	600,000^{*}
Summaries
Europe (IFPI)	Platinum	1,000,000^{*}
^{*} Sales figures based on certification alone.^{^} Shipments figures based on certification alone.

== Notes ==
1. The rear cover contains a typo with track 4 "Too Much Love Will Kill You" reading "Wiil" instead of "Will".
