= Greatest Hits (Queen album) =

- Original 1981 edition

Greatest hits album by Queen
- Released: 26 October 1981
- Genre: Rock
- Length: 58:19 (UK edition)
- Labels: EMI; Elektra
- Producer: Various

Queen chronology
Flash Gordon (1980)	Greatest Hits (1981)	Hot Space (1982)

Alternative cover
- 1992 US edition

Greatest Hits is a compilation album by the British rock band Queen, released worldwide on 26 October 1981. The album consisted of Queen's biggest hits since their first chart appearance in 1974 with "Seven Seas of Rhye", up to their 1980 hit "Flash" (although in some countries, "Under Pressure", the band's 1981 UK number one single with David Bowie, was also included). There was no universal track listing or cover art for the album, and each territory's tracks were dependent on what singles had been released there and which were successful. In 1992, a new American version of the album with a revised track listing was released alongside a new companion album, Classic Queen, following the band's rekindled popularity in the nation.

Greatest Hits is the band's best-selling album to date, with total sales of over 25 million copies, making it one of the best-selling albums of all time. It spent four weeks at number one in the UK Albums Chart, and sold consistently well throughout the 1980s, becoming the fourth-biggest selling album of the decade. As of November 2026, Greatest Hits has spent 1,232 weeks on the UK Albums Chart and has been certified 26× platinum with sales of over seven million copies, making it the best-selling album of all time in the UK.

Greatest Hits peaked at number eight on the Billboard 200 in November 2020, the second-slowest ascent to the top ten of the US album chart in history. Among the longest charting albums in the US, as of November 2026, it has spent 725 weeks on the Billboard 200 and has been certified 9× platinum in the US. It has also been certified 15× platinum in Australia, 10× platinum in New Zealand, and 3× platinum in Canada. Following the release of the Queen biopic Bohemian Rhapsody in 2018, it re-entered the charts worldwide.

== Release ==
There was no universal track listing or cover art for the Greatest Hits album, and each territory's tracks were dependent on what singles were released there and what tracks charted. In some territories, despite the band's popularity, not enough songs were issued as singles to fill a compilation album, and a few album tracks were used as filler. Some examples of these were "Sweet Lady" and "Love of My Life", neither of which was released as a single in any country but appear on some regions' 1981 Hits release. In the UK, the album was limited to the Queen singles that had reached the top 20 in the UK singles chart up to that point, plus "We Will Rock You", which had been the B-side of "We Are the Champions".

The US ended up with its original mono edit of Queen's first single release, "Keep Yourself Alive", originally released in 1973 and re-released in the US in 1975, following the success of "Bohemian Rhapsody". The US version also added "Under Pressure", Queen's collaboration with David Bowie, which was released the same week as Greatest Hits and subsequently topped the UK singles chart and reached the top ten in many charts around the world. The song was not included on the European versions of Greatest Hits – according to Queen's manager Jim Beach, this was because the longer manufacturing time required to press records in Europe meant that several hundred thousand copies of the album had already been pressed up before the song had been recorded.

In Argentina and Brazil, the LP edition included the same track listing as the UK Greatest Hits, minus "Seven Seas of Rhye" and including "Love of My Life" (Live Killers version). The CD version is the same as the British version.

The cover photo that appeared on the UK and US release was taken by Lord Snowdon at his home studio, using only natural light. For the 1981 release, the photo was skewed, but was later presented as it was originally taken for the 2011 re-release.

In 1991, Queen sought to issue a second Greatest Hits collection worldwide, this time with a standard track listing. However, the band had just changed record labels in the US, from Capitol to Hollywood Records, who were keen on a massive promotion of the band's back catalogue. The problem was that Elektra still held the US rights to that first 1981 collection (despite being Hollywood's US licensee). Hollywood Records decided not to release Greatest Hits II to the US market, but instead created their own collection, Classic Queen (1992), peaking at number four on the Billboard 200 chart. This compilation was made up of tracks such as "Bohemian Rhapsody", "Keep Yourself Alive" and "Under Pressure" (which had already appeared on the Elektra 1981 Hits collection), as well as newer tracks ("A Kind of Magic" and "Radio Ga Ga"). Some tracks were not even singles in the US ("One Year of Love") or anywhere ("Stone Cold Crazy"). Though well received, this collection would eventually pose the problem of overlapping track lists in the future.

Later that year, Hollywood Records released a companion collection, Greatest Hits, with similar artwork (on a red background, where Classic Queen was on royal blue). Commonly referred to as the Red Greatest Hits, it features most of the '70s tracks absent from Classic Queen (including "Another One Bites the Dust", "We Will Rock You", "We Are the Champions" and "Killer Queen").

In 2004, to promote the Las Vegas production of the musical We Will Rock You, Hollywood Records released Greatest Hits: We Will Rock You Edition, which was the UK Greatest Hits with three bonus tracks.

== Greatest Flix and Greatest Pix ==
Greatest Hits was released alongside Greatest Flix, a 60-minute compilation released on VHS video, LaserDisc, and CED Videodisc of all the videos Queen had made up until that point in chronological order, and Greatest Pix, a 96-page paperback book edited by Jacques Lowe which featured photos of the band taken by Neal Preston. Although Greatest Flix only listed 17 videos on its sleeve, it contained two videos for "We Will Rock You". The video for "Killer Queen" had been shot especially for Greatest Flix, as no video had been made for the song on its original release in 1974. In the US, the release of Greatest Flix was scheduled for 15 November 1981 on Warner Home Video, but distribution was switched to EMI Music after the band's management disagreed with Warner's recent decision to move to a rental-only programme instead of selling their videos. In 1992, Hollywood Records released a VHS version to accompany the album, simply called Greatest Hits.

Greatest Flix (1981)

1. "Killer Queen"
2. "Bohemian Rhapsody"
3. "You're My Best Friend"
4. "Somebody to Love"
5. "Tie Your Mother Down"
6. "We Are the Champions"
7. "We Will Rock You"
8. "We Will Rock You (Live)"
9. "Spread Your Wings"
10. "Bicycle Race"
11. "Fat Bottomed Girls"
12. "Don't Stop Me Now"
13. "Love of My Life (Live)"
14. "Crazy Little Thing Called Love"
15. "Save Me"
16. "Play the Game"
17. "Another One Bites the Dust"
18. "Flash"

Note: On the sleeve notes of the video, "We Are the Champions" is incorrectly listed after the two versions of "We Will Rock You".

Greatest Hits (1992 American edition)

1. "We Will Rock You"
2. "We Are the Champions"
3. "Another One Bites the Dust"
4. "Killer Queen"
5. "Somebody to Love"
6. "Fat Bottomed Girls"
7. "Bicycle Race"
8. "You're My Best Friend"
9. "Crazy Little Thing Called Love"
10. "Now I'm Here"
11. "Play the Game"
12. "Seven Seas of Rhye"
13. "Body Language"
14. "Save Me"
15. "Don't Stop Me Now"
16. "Good Old-Fashioned Lover Boy"
17. "I Want to Break Free"
18. "Bohemian Rhapsody (Original version)"
19. "We Will Rock You (Rick Rubin 'Ruined' Remix Edit)" (end credits)

Note: New videos were created for Now I'm Here, Seven Seas of Rhye and Good Old-Fashioned Lover Boy for this collection, as they did not previously have music videos.

== Critical reception and legacy ==
Professional ratings
Review scores
Source	Rating
AllMusic	4.5/5 stars
Entertainment Weekly	B+
MusicHound Rock	4/5 stars
The Rolling Stone Album Guide	3/5 stars

Initial reviews of the album in the British music press were negative. In NME, Barney Hoskyns said, "All of [their songs], besides 'Another One Bites the Dust', are quite repulsive, unbelievably crass insults to their respective genres and uniformly vulgar music. It was only when Queen took vulgarity to its absolute limit that they stood out." Melody Maker's Adam Sweeting stated, "I've never been the slightest bit interested in Queen's ridiculous pomposity and Freddie just makes me snigger, but I suppose songs like 'Killer Queen' are sort of catchy, while anything as preposterous as 'We Will Rock You' deserves an award if only for bad taste".

Retrospective reviews have rated the album higher: Ira Robbins gave Greatest Hits a B+ rating in Entertainment Weekly upon its reissue in 1992, and AllMusic awarded the record four and a half stars out of five. In an interview in 2003 as part of the Arte television programme Music Planet 2Nite, Radiohead guitarist Ed O'Brien hailed the album as "impeccable" and "absolutely genius".

== Commercial performance ==
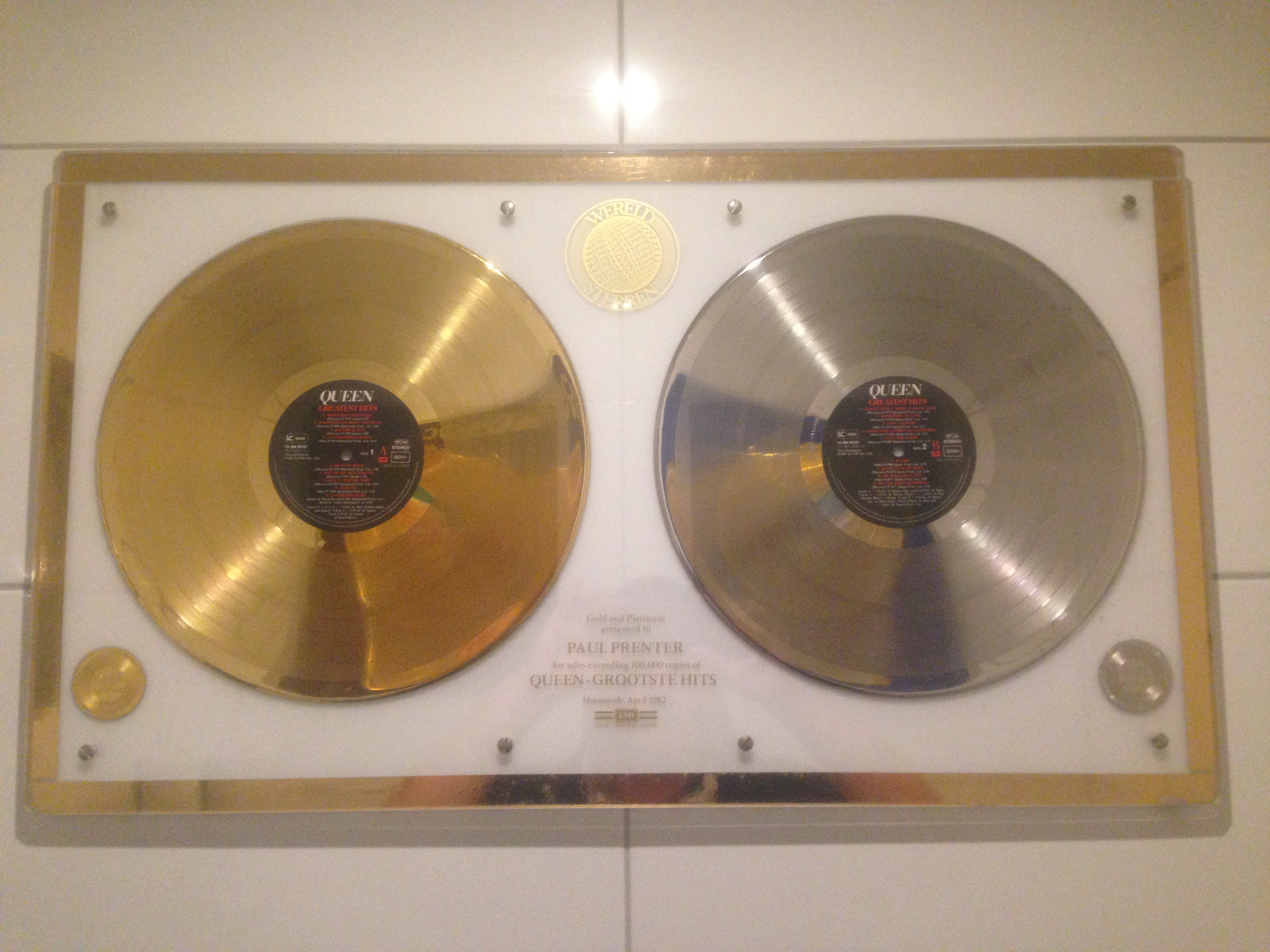
Gold and platinum discs issued by EMI in 1982 for Greatest Hits (1981). With more than 25 million copies sold, it is Queen's best selling album.

In the UK, Greatest Hits debuted at number two on the UK Albums Chart and climbed to number one the following week, spending four weeks at the top, for three of which it held Prince Charming by Adam and the Ants to second place. The album continued to sell well throughout the 1980s, appearing on several UK year-end charts, and by the end of the decade it had become the fourth-biggest selling album in the UK during the 1980s, with sales of over 1.9 million copies. By 2006, Greatest Hits had become the best-selling album in the UK and the first album to sell more than five million copies there. In February 2014, Greatest Hits became the first album in the UK to sell over six million copies, and it was claimed that one in three families in the UK owned a copy. In June 2022, Greatest Hits spent its 1,000th week on the UK Albums Chart, and in July 2022, it reached seven million sales, with one in four households in the UK estimated to have a copy of the album. As of November 2026, the album has spent 1,232 weeks in the top 100 of the UK Albums Chart.

In the US, Greatest Hits sold moderately well on initial release in 1981, obtaining a platinum certification. It reached a new peak of number 11 on the Billboard 200 chart on its reissue in 1992, and finally made the top ten of the Billboard 200 in November 2020 when it peaked at number eight, as a result of a Walmart sale on various vinyl albums on 14 November 2020. The 39 years and one month that the album took to reach the top ten of the Billboard 200 is the second-longest ascent to the top ten in the history of the US album chart. One of the longest charting albums in the US, as of November 2026 it has spent 725 weeks on the Billboard 200. Greatest Hits has now been certified nine times platinum in the US for sales of nine million copies, making it the band's best-selling album in that country. It is also the band's best-selling album to date, with total sales of over 25 million copies.

== Track listing ==
This section includes the track listings for the original Greatest Hits in its various forms. For other compilations, including the second and third Greatest Hits albums, see the relevant articles.

On the 17-track UK editions, Freddie Mercury was the writer of ten of the songs, Brian May five and John Deacon two. Roger Taylor had not written any songs that had been released as singles for the band at that point.

1981 UK edition (EMI) & 2011 UK edition (Island) Has a photograph of the band as its cover. Side one
No.	Title	Writer(s)	Length
1.	"Bohemian Rhapsody" (from A Night at the Opera, 1975)	Freddie Mercury	5:57
2.	"Another One Bites the Dust" (from The Game, 1980)	John Deacon	3:36
3.	"Killer Queen" (from Sheer Heart Attack, 1974)	Mercury	2:57
4.	"Fat Bottomed Girls" (single version, from Jazz, 1978)	Brian May	3:22
5.	"Bicycle Race" (from Jazz, 1978)	Mercury	3:01
6.	"You're My Best Friend" (from A Night at the Opera, 1975)	Deacon	2:52
7.	"Don't Stop Me Now" (from Jazz, 1978)	Mercury	3:29
8.	"Save Me" (from The Game, 1980)	May	3:48

Side two
No.	Title	Writer(s)	Length
9.	"Crazy Little Thing Called Love" (from The Game, 1980)	Mercury	2:42
10.	"Somebody to Love" (from A Day at the Races, 1976)	Mercury	4:56
11.	"Now I'm Here" (from Sheer Heart Attack, 1974)	May	4:10
12.	"Good Old-Fashioned Lover Boy" (from A Day at the Races, 1976)	Mercury	2:54
13.	"Play the Game" (from The Game, 1980)	Mercury	3:33
14.	"Flash" (single version, from Flash Gordon, 1980)	May	2:48
15.	"Seven Seas of Rhye" (from Queen II, 1974)	Mercury	2:47
16.	"We Will Rock You" (from News of the World, 1977)	May	2:01
17.	"We Are the Champions" (from News of the World, 1977)	Mercury	3:00
Total length:			58:44

1981 US and Canada edition
No.	Title	Writer(s)	Length
1.	"Another One Bites the Dust"		3:37
2.	"Bohemian Rhapsody"		5:58
3.	"Crazy Little Thing Called Love"		2:44
4.	"Killer Queen"		3:02
5.	"Fat Bottomed Girls"		3:23
6.	"Bicycle Race"		3:01
7.	"Under Pressure" (later included on Hot Space, 1982)	Queen, David Bowie	4:05
8.	"We Will Rock You"		2:02
9.	"We Are the Champions"		3:01
10.	"Flash"		2:49
11.	"Somebody to Love"		4:58
12.	"You're My Best Friend"		2:52
13.	"Keep Yourself Alive" (single version in mono, from Queen, 1973)	May	3:32
14.	"Play the Game"		3:30
Total length:			47:58

1981 Japan edition
No.	Title	Writer(s)	Length
1.	"Bohemian Rhapsody"		5:55
2.	"Another One Bites the Dust"		3:33
3.	"Killer Queen"		3:00
4.	"Fat Bottomed Girls"		3:22
5.	"Good Old-Fashioned Lover Boy"		2:32
6.	"Don't Stop Me Now"		3:28
7.	"Save Me"		3:48
8.	"Under Pressure"		4:05
9.	"Crazy Little Thing Called Love"		2:42
10.	"Somebody to Love"		4:55
11.	"Now I'm Here"		4:15
12.	"Teo Torriatte" (single version, from A Day At The Races, 1976)	May	5:00
13.	"You're My Best Friend"		2:50
14.	"Play the Game"		3:28
15.	"Flash's Theme A.K.A. Flash"		2:47
16.	"We Will Rock You"		2:00
17.	"We Are the Champions"		2:58
Total length:			60:37

1992 US edition (Hollywood Records) Has a red cover with the Queen crest design.
No.	Title	Writer(s)	Length
1.	"We Will Rock You"		2:02
2.	"We Are the Champions"		3:01
3.	"Another One Bites the Dust"		3:37
4.	"Killer Queen"		3:01
5.	"Somebody to Love"		4:56
6.	"Fat Bottomed Girls (LP version)"		4:16
7.	"Bicycle Race"		3:02
8.	"You're My Best Friend"		2:51
9.	"Crazy Little Thing Called Love"		2:43
10.	"Now I'm Here"		4:14
11.	"Play the Game"		3:31
12.	"Seven Seas of Rhye"		2:48
13.	"Body Language" (from Hot Space, 1982)	Mercury	4:33
14.	"Save Me"		3:48
15.	"Don't Stop Me Now"		3:34
16.	"Good Old-Fashioned Lover Boy"		2:55
17.	"I Want to Break Free" (single version, from The Works, 1984)	Deacon	4:22
Total length:			58:43

2004 US edition (Greatest Hits: We Will Rock You) Same track listing as UK 1981 edition, followed by three additional tracks.
No.	Title	Writer(s)	Length
18.	"I'm in Love with My Car" (rare original single mix, from A Night at the Opera, 1975)	Roger Taylor	3:12
19.	"Under Pressure" (from Queen on Fire – Live at the Bowl, 2004)		3:39
20.	"Tie Your Mother Down" (from Queen on Fire – Live at the Bowl, 2004)	May	3:52
Total length:			69:17

2011 Japan reissue edition From the bonus track for Japan, available on iTunes.
No.	Title	Writer(s)	Length
18.	"Teo Torriatte (Let Us Cling Together)" (From A Day at the Races, 1976)	May	5:07
Total length:			63:00

In addition to the variations above, the official biography Queen: As It Began by Jacky Gunn and Jim Jenkins states the following variations on the original UK track listing:

- Argentina, Brazil, Mexico and Venezuela had "Love of My Life" (live version) instead of "Seven Seas of Rhye".
- Belgium and Spain had "Spread Your Wings" as an extra track.
- Australia was identical to the US version, but had "Tie Your Mother Down" (live version, with organ intro) as an extra track.
- Bulgaria had "Death On Two Legs" and "Sweet Lady" as extra tracks.
- Canada, France, Germany, Israel and Netherlands had "Under Pressure" as an extra track.
- Germany also added "Spread Your Wings" on some first pressing copies.

== Personnel ==
Queen

- Freddie Mercury – lead, backing and operatic vocals, acoustic piano, jangle piano, fingersnaps, bicycle bells, handclaps, acoustic guitar, organ, synthesiser, footstomps, fingersnaps (on original North American release only), drum machine (on 1991 North American release only), synth bass
- Brian May – acoustic and electric guitars, co-lead vocals on "Fat Bottomed Girls" (chorus), backing and operatic vocals, bicycle bells, handclaps, piano, synthesiser, footstomps, fingersnaps (on original North American release only), co-lead vocals on "Keep Yourself Alive" (bridge), harmonium (on Japanese release only)
- Roger Taylor – acoustic and (on 1991 North American release only) electronic drums, percussion, backing and operatic vocals, timpani, gong, triangle, chimes, bicycle bells, handclaps, woodblocks, tambourine, footstomps, fingersnaps (on original North American release only), cowbell, co-lead vocals on "Keep Yourself Alive" (bridge), rhythm guitar (on 2004 US edition), lead vocals (on 2004 US edition)
- John Deacon – bass guitar, electric guitar, acoustic and electric pianos, bicycle bells, handclaps, footstomps, fingersnaps (on original North American release only), synthesiser (on 1991 North American release only)

Additional personnel (original UK release)

- Mike Stone – co-lead vocals on "Good Old-Fashioned Lover Boy"
- Roy Thomas Baker – stylophone on "Seven Seas of Rhye"

Additional personnel (original North American release)

- David Bowie – co-lead vocals on "Under Pressure"

Additional personnel (1991 North American release)

- Fred Mandel – synthesiser on "I Want to Break Free"

== Charts ==
=== Weekly charts ===
Weekly chart performance from Greatest Hits
Chart (1981–1982)	Peak position
Australian Albums (Kent Music Report)	2
Austrian Albums (Ö3 Austria)	1
Dutch Albums (Album Top 100)	1
German Albums (Offizielle Top 100)	1
New Zealand Albums (RMNZ)	1
Norwegian Albums (VG-lista)	21
UK Albums (Official Charts)	1
US Billboard 200	14
Chart (1991–1992)	Peak position
Australian Albums (ARIA)	8
Canadian Albums (RPM)	4
Finnish Albums (Suomen Virallinen)	3
French Compilations (SNEP)	5
Swedish Albums (Sverigetopplistan)	21
Swiss Albums (Schweizer Hitparade)	5
US Billboard 200	11
Chart (2004)	Peak position
US Billboard 200 We Will Rock You edition	42
Chart (2008)	Peak position
Spanish Albums (Promusicae)	63
Chart (2009)	Peak position
US Top Hard Rock Albums (Billboard) We Will Rock You edition	23
Chart (2011)	Peak position
Belgian Albums (Ultratop Wallonia)	78
French Albums (SNEP)	56
Mexican Albums (Top 100 Mexico)	53
Chart (2016)	Peak position
Portuguese Albums (AFP)	49
Chart (2018–2019)	Peak position
Australia (ARIA Charts)	3
Belgian Albums (Ultratop Flanders)	46
Belgian Albums (Ultratop Wallonia)	36
Canadian Albums (Billboard)	7
Czech Albums (IFPI)	2
Italian Albums (FIMI)	37
Japan (Oricon Charts)	13
Mexican Albums (AMPROFON)	2
Portuguese Albums (AFP)	11
UK Albums (Official Charts)	31
US Billboard 200	11
US Top Hard Rock Albums (Billboard)	1
US Top Rock Albums (Billboard)	1
Chart (2020–2026)	Peak position
Argentine Albums (CAPIF)	1
Belgian Albums (Ultratop Flanders)	14
Hungarian Albums (MAHASZ)	23
Irish Albums (Official Charts)	5
Polish Albums (ZPAV)	24
Portuguese Albums (AFP)	6
Scottish Albums (Official Charts)	1
UK Albums (Official Charts)	2
US Billboard 200	8

=== Year-end charts ===
Year-end chart performance for Greatest Hits
Chart (1981)	Rank
Dutch Albums (MegaCharts)	9
New Zealand Albums (RMNZ)	11
UK Albums (BMRB)	2
Chart (1982)	Rank
Australian Albums (Kent Music Report)	23
Austrian Albums (Ö3 Austria)	18
Dutch Albums (MegaCharts)	24
German Albums (Offizielle Top 100)	43
New Zealand Albums (RMNZ)	25
UK Albums (BMRB)	27
Chart (1984)	Rank
UK Albums (Gallup)	47
Chart (1985)	Rank
UK Albums (Gallup)	43
Chart (1986)	Rank
UK Albums (Gallup)	35
Chart (1991)	Rank
Argentina Foreign Albums (CAPIF)	2
UK Albums (Gallup)	25
Chart (1992)	Rank
Australian Albums (ARIA)	16
Austrian Albums (Ö3 Austria)	7
German Albums (Offizielle Top 100)	2
New Zealand Albums (RMNZ)	15
UK Albums (Gallup)	34
Chart (1993)	Rank
UK Albums (OCC)	90
US Billboard 200	60
Chart (2001)	Rank
UK Albums (OCC)	155
Chart (2002)	Position
Canadian Albums (Nielsen SoundScan)	190
Canadian Metal Albums (Nielsen SoundScan)	30
Chart (2015)	Rank
UK Albums (OCC)	77
US Billboard 200 We Will Rock You edition	171
Chart (2016)	Rank
Mexican Albums (AMPROFON)	92
UK Albums (OCC)	69
Chart (2017)	Rank
Australian Albums (ARIA)	55
Mexican Albums (AMPROFON)	71
UK Albums (OCC)	68
US Top Rock Albums (Billboard)	49
Chart (2018)	Rank
Australian Albums (ARIA)	8
Czech Albums (ČNS IFPI)	8
Mexican Albums (AMPROFON)	14
New Zealand Albums (RMNZ)	39
UK Albums (OCC)	40
US Billboard 200	96
US Top Rock Albums (Billboard)	12
Chart (2019)	Rank
Australian Albums (ARIA)	9
Belgian Albums (Ultratop Flanders)	115
Belgian Albums (Ultratop Wallonia)	100
Italian Albums (FIMI)	85
Mexican Albums (AMPROFON)	9
Swiss Albums (Schweizer Hitparade)	57
UK Albums (OCC)	81
US Billboard 200	27
US Top Rock Albums (Billboard)	2
Chart (2020)	Rank
Australian Albums (ARIA)	52
Irish Albums (IRMA)	20
UK Albums (OCC)	8
US Billboard 200	25
US Top Rock Albums (Billboard)	1
Chart (2021)	Rank
Australian Albums (ARIA)	91
Belgian Albums (Ultratop Flanders)	74
Belgian Albums (Ultratop Wallonia)	146
German Albums (Offizielle Top 100)	61
Hungarian Albums (MAHASZ)	92
Irish Albums (IRMA)	6
Swiss Albums (Schweizer Hitparade)	70
UK Albums (OCC)	5
US Billboard 200	23
US Top Rock Albums (Billboard)	1
Chart (2022)	Rank
Belgian Albums (Ultratop Flanders)	164
Canadian Albums (Billboard)	25
UK Albums (OCC)	11
US Billboard 200	31
US Independent Albums (Billboard)	3
US Top Rock Albums (Billboard)	2
Chart (2023)	Rank
Canadian Albums (Billboard)	30
UK Albums (OCC)	20
US Billboard 200	33
US Independent Albums (Billboard)	4
US Top Rock Albums (Billboard)	4
Chart (2024)	Rank
Canadian Albums (Billboard)	38
UK Albums (OCC)	25
US Billboard 200	47
Chart (2025)	Rank
Canadian Albums (Billboard)	44
UK Albums (OCC)	31
US Billboard 200	64

=== Decade-end charts ===
Decade-end chart performance for Greatest Hits
Chart (1980–1989)	Position
UK Albums (Gallup)	4
Chart (2010–2019)	Position
Australian Albums (ARIA)	52
UK Albums (OCC)	89

== Certifications and sales ==
Region	Certification	Certified units/sales
Argentina (CAPIF)	Diamond	506,916
Australia (ARIA)	15× Platinum	1,050,000^{^}
Austria (IFPI Austria)	4× Platinum	200,000^{*}
Belgium (BRMA)	Platinum	50,000^{*}
Brazil (Pro-Música Brasil)	Platinum	250,000^{*}
Canada (Music Canada)	3× Platinum	300,000^{^}
Finland (Musiikkituottajat)	Platinum	55,058
France (SNEP)	2× Platinum	200,000^{‡}
Germany (BVMI)	7× Gold	1,750,000^{^}
Italy (FIMI) sales since 2009	2× Platinum	100,000^{‡}
Japan (RIAJ)	Gold	100,000^{^}
Mexico (AMPROFON)	Gold	100,000^{^}
Netherlands (NVPI)	Platinum	100,000^{^}
New Zealand (RMNZ)	10× Platinum	150,000^{‡}
Poland (ZPAV)	Gold	10,000^{‡}
Portugal (AFP)	Gold	10,000^{^}
South Africa (RISA)	3× Platinum	150,000^{*}
South Korea	—	536,546
Spain (Promusicae)	Gold	50,000^{^}
Sweden (GLF)	Gold	50,000^{^}
Switzerland (IFPI Switzerland)	5× Platinum	250,000^{^}
United Kingdom (BPI)	26× Platinum	7,800,000^{‡}
United States (RIAA) 1981 release	9× Platinum	9,000,000^{‡}
United States (RIAA) 1992 release	5× Platinum	5,000,000^{‡}
Summaries
Worldwide	—	25,000,000
^{*} Sales figures based on certification alone.^{^} Shipments figures based on certification alone.^{‡} Sales+streaming figures based on certification alone.

== Release history ==
Date	Region	Label	Format	Catalog number
26 October 1981	United Kingdom	EMI	LP / cassette	EMTV 30
26 October 1981	United States	Elektra	LP	5E-564
1990	Soviet Union	Melodiya	LP	А60 00703 001
15 September 1992	United States	Hollywood	CD	61265
17 August 2004	United States	Hollywood	CD	2061-62465-2
3 January 2011	United Kingdom	Island	CD	2758364

== See also ==
- List of best-selling albums
- List of best-selling albums in Australia
- List of best-selling albums in Austria
- List of best-selling albums in Germany
- List of best-selling albums in the United Kingdom
