= Let Me in Your Heart Again =

Song by Queen

Song by Queen

from the album Queen Forever
- Published: Queen Music Ltd.
- Released: 10 November 2014
- Recorded: 1983, 2014
- Genre: Rock
- Length: 4:31
- Label: EMI; Parlophone; Elektra
- Songwriter: Brian May
- Producers: Queen; Kris Fredriksson; Justin-Shirley Smith; Joshua J Macrae

"Let Me in Your Heart Again" is a song by British rock band Queen. It was written by lead guitarist Brian May. It was intended for The Works but was not finished until 2014, when it was released on the compilation Queen Forever. To date, it is the last original Queen track to be released as a 12” maxi-single. The 12” maxi-single with the William Orbit remix is included as an extra in the Queen Forever 4 LP box set.

== History ==
Originating from sessions for the band's 1984 album The Works, "Let Me In Your Heart Again" was written by Brian May and originally recorded in Los Angeles in 1983. On The Chris Evans Breakfast Show in September 2014, May revealed that the band had found it impossible to complete the track, despite several versions of the lyrics being written to make it easier for Mercury to sing. The band eventually abandoned the song, although it was later recorded by Anita Dobson for her 1988 studio album Talking of Love, featuring May on guitar.

For Queen Forever, May wove together parts from each of the existing Queen versions, before he and Taylor fleshed out the music. Consequently, the result contains very different lyrics from Anita Dobson's 1988 version.

"I was very pleased we had three new tracks to put on [Queen Forever]…" remarked Taylor. "'Let Me In Your Heart Again' is absolutely typical mid-period Queen… When I put the original tape on, it was so astonishingly real, like it had been recorded that morning. I got quite emotional about the way Freddie was doing his thing. It's like suddenly coming across recordings of your parents after they're gone. And then it turns into something rather joyful."

== Music video ==
The music videos for both the album version video and the William Orbit mix ones feature unseen footage from the Works Tour at Brussels in 1984, Rock Montreal video and promo video clips "Who Wants to Live Forever," "A Kind Of Magic," "I Want It All," "One Vision," "Play the Game", "Barcelona," and "Living on My Own." Both the album version and the William Orbit mix videos appear on Queen's official YouTube page.

== Chart performance ==
Chart (2014)	Peak position
France (SNEP)	133
Spain (PROMUSICAE)	24

== Anita Dobson version ==
A version of the song was recorded by May's now-wife Anita Dobson (with May on guitar) for her 1988 studio album Talking of Love. She reportedly used the Queen version(s) as a guide vocal.

== William Orbit mix ==
"Let Me in Your Heart Again (William Orbit mix)"
- UK picture sleeve

Single by Queen

from the album Queen Forever
- Released: 3 November 2014
- Recorded: 1983, 2014
- Genre: Rock; disco; pop
- Length: 6:42
- Label: EMI; Parlophone; Elektra
- Songwriter: Brian May
- Producers: Queen; Kris Fredriksson; Justin-Shirley Smith; Joshua J Macrae; William Orbit

Queen singles chronology
"Love Kills - The Ballad" (2014)	"Let Me in Your Heart Again (William Orbit mix)" (2014)	"We Will Rock You (Raw session)" (2017)

A remix by William Orbit was released in November 2014 as a single in the UK to raise money for Product Red, an initiative founded in 2006 by U2 frontman Bono for the purpose of engaging the private sector in raising awareness and funds to help eliminate HIV/AIDS in Africa. This mix features William Orbit on keyboards and programming.

The song charted at #102 in British charts.

=== Charts ===
Chart (2014)	Peak position
Belgium (Ultratip Bubbling Under Flanders)	72
Belgium (Ultratip Bubbling Under Wallonia)	40
US Hot Rock & Alternative Songs (Billboard)	47

== Personnel ==
- Freddie Mercury - lead and backing vocals
- Brian May - acoustic and electric guitars, backing vocals
- Roger Taylor - drums, percussion, backing vocals
- John Deacon - bass guitar
- Fred Mandel - piano

Additional Remix musician:

- William Orbit - keyboards and programming (Remix only)
