= Let Us Cling Together =

Let Us Cling Together may refer to:

- Tactics Ogre: Let Us Cling Together, a seminal tactical role-playing game
- "Teo Torriatte (Let Us Cling Together)", a song by English rock band Queen from their 1976 album A Day at the Races
