= Itoshi Kimi e =

- Genre: Drama, Romance
- Written by: Yuji Sakamoto
- Starring: Miho Kanno; Naohito Fujiki; Misaki Ito
- Country of origin: Japan
- Original language: Japanese
- No. of episodes: 11

Production
- Running time: 54 minutes

Original release
- Network: Fuji TV
- Release: April 19 – June 28, 2004

Itoshi Kimi e (愛し君へ; "To The One I Love") is a Japanese television series that aired on Fuji Television in 2004. The drama is based on the novel Gege by Masashi Sada.

== Cast ==
- Miho Kanno as Shiki Tomokawa
- Naohito Fujiki as Shunsuke Azumi
- Misaki Ito as Ai Asakura
- Hiroshi Tamaki as Shingo Orihara
- Mirai Moriyama as Mitsuo Tomokawa
- Tomoka Kurotani as Asako Takaizumi
- Kenichi Yajima as Yukihiko Ogasawara
- Kaoru Yachigusa as Yoshie Azumi
- Shigeru Izumiya as Tetsuo Tomokawa
- Saburō Tokitō as Keisuke Furuya
- Masato Irie
- Ruri Matsuo
- Saki Aibu
- Mirai Shida (episode 3)
- Natsumi Yamada (episode 6)

== Episodes ==
1. Love is something you never stop working for
2. A forgotten item
3. The fate of a love too painful
4. Rain of tears
5. To Nagasaki
6. Your hometown
7. Love is not regretting
8. Father's Day present
9. Dear Mother
10. Shock
11. The last thing I want you to see

Preceded by Pride; 12 January 2004 - 22 March 2004	Fuji TV Getsuku Drama; Mondays 21:00 - 21:54 (JST)	Succeeded by Tokyo Wankei: Destiny of Love; 5 July 2004 - 13 September 2004

== See also ==
- List of Japanese television dramas
- Fuji Television
