= Driven by You =

1991 single by Brian May

Single by Brian May

from the album Back to the Light
- B-side: "Just One Life"
- Released: 25 November 1991
- Length: 4:11
- Label: Parlophone
- Songwriter: Brian May
- Producers: Brian May; David Richards; Justin Shirley-Smith

Brian May singles chronology
"Star Fleet" (1983)	"Driven by You" (1991)	"Too Much Love Will Kill You" (1992)

"Driven by You" is a song by Queen lead guitarist Brian May from his 1992 solo album, Back to the Light. It was released as the lead single on 25 November 1991 by Parlophone, a day after the death of May's Queen bandmate Freddie Mercury.

== Promotion ==
Shortly before releasing it as single, May played it on the Guitar Legends concert in October 1991, having a super-group backing him: Cozy Powell on drums, Neil Murray on bass, Steve Vai on rhythm guitar, Rick Wakeman and Mike Moran on keyboards, Maggie Ryder, Miriam Stockley and Chris Thompson on backing vocals.

== Release and versions ==
Besides the original album/single version, there are at least three additional studio versions of the song. The first, originally written for a series of television advertisements for Ford in the UK, is a shorter take with alternative lyrics; it was released as a B-side exclusive to the 12-inch single in the UK. Following the single's release, a version was produced featuring a new drum track by Cozy Powell; this version was released as B-side to the single "Too Much Love Will Kill You" and as a bonus track on the US release of Back to the Light. Finally, May recorded a short instrumental version of the song, titled "Driven by You Two"; this was released as B-side to his single "Resurrection".

"Driven by You" was included on Queen's 1999 album Greatest Hits III; and later re-released on 25 June 2021 to promote the re-release and remastering of Back to the Light (released August 2021), accompanied by a newly-edited and remastered video.

== Chart performance ==
"Driven by You" peaked at number six on the UK Singles Chart, number nine in Portugal, number 10 in the Netherlands, number 14 in Ireland, and number 35 in Belgium. On the Eurochart Hot 100, it reached number 20. In 1993, the song charted in North America, reaching number nine on the US Billboard Album Rock Tracks chart and number 70 on the Canadian RPM Top Singles chart.

== Track listings ==
"Just One Life" is dedicated to the memory of British actor Philip Sayer.

7-inch and cassette single

1. "Driven by You" – 4:11
2. "Just One Life" – 3:43

12-inch single

A1. "Driven by You" – 4:11
B1. "Just One Life" – 3:43
B2. "Just One Life" (guitar version) – 3:38
B3. "Driven by You" (Ford Ad version) – 1:30

CD single

1. "Driven by You" – 4:13
2. "Just One Life" – 3:38
3. "Just One Life" (guitar version) – 3:38

== Personnel ==
- Brian May – lead and backing vocals, guitar, bass guitar, keyboards, drum programming
- Design by Richard Gray
- Photography by Brian May, Simon Fowler
- Written by Brian May

== Charts ==
=== Weekly charts ===
Chart (1991–1993)	Peak position
Australia (ARIA)	162
Belgium (Ultratop 50 Flanders)	35
Canada Top Singles (RPM)	70
Europe (Eurochart Hot 100)	20
Ireland (IRMA)	14
Luxembourg (Radio Luxembourg)	2
Netherlands (Dutch Top 40)	10
Netherlands (Single Top 100)	10
Portugal (AFP)	9
UK Singles (Official Charts)	6
UK Airplay (Music Week)	9
US Mainstream Rock (Billboard)	9

=== Year-end charts ===
Chart (1991)	Position
UK Singles (OCC)	73

Chart (1992)	Position
Netherlands (Single Top 100)	88
