= Made in Heaven =

1995 rock album by Queen

Studio album by Queen
- Released: 6 November 1995
- Recorded: January 1980 – May 1991; October 1993 – February 1995
- Studios: Mountain; Allerton Hill; Cosford Mill; Metropolis
- Genre: Rock
- Length: 70:21 (original CD); 47:45 (original LP); 69:43 (2015 reissue LP)
- Labels: Parlophone; Hollywood
- Producers: Queen; David Richards

Queen chronology
Greatest Hits I & II (1994)	Made in Heaven (1995)	Queen Rocks (1997)

Queen studio album chronology
Innuendo (1991)	Made in Heaven (1995)

Singles from Made in Heaven
- 1. "Heaven for Everyone" Released: 23 October 1995; 2. "Too Much Love Will Kill You" Released: 5 December 1995 (US); 3. "A Winter's Tale" Released: 11 December 1995 (UK); 4. "You Don't Fool Me" Released: 26 February 1996 (EU); 5. "I Was Born to Love You" Released: 28 February 1996 (Japan); 6. "Let Me Live" Released: 17 June 1996

Made in Heaven is the fifteenth and final studio album by the British rock band Queen, released on 6 November 1995 by Parlophone Records in the United Kingdom and by Hollywood Records in the United States. It is the final studio album to be released under the name "Queen" and it was the band's first and only album released solely under the name "Queen" after the death of lead vocalist Freddie Mercury in November 1991. Following Mercury's death, guitarist Brian May, drummer Roger Taylor, and bass guitarist John Deacon worked with vocal and piano parts that Mercury recorded before his death, adding new instrumentation to the recordings. Both stages of recording, before and after Mercury's death, were completed at the band's studio in Montreux, Switzerland. The album debuted at number 1 in the UK, where it went quadruple platinum selling 1.2 million copies. 500,000 copies were shipped in the United States.

After the recordings, Queen released the single "No-One but You (Only the Good Die Young)" in 1997 and only played sporadic concerts together until 2004, when May and Taylor started touring with Bad Company frontman Paul Rodgers and later with Adam Lambert; Deacon retired from music in 1997 and has not taken part in any Queen activity since then.

The cover for the album has two different photos: the CD cover photo was shot at dusk, depicting Irena Sedlecká's Mercury sculpture located at Lake Geneva in Montreux, Switzerland, on the front, with May, Taylor and Deacon gazing at the Alps on the rear cover; meanwhile, the LP cover photo was shot in the same spot at dawn, depicting the same statue on the front but with May, Taylor and Deacon gazing at the sunrise on the rear cover.

== Background and recording ==
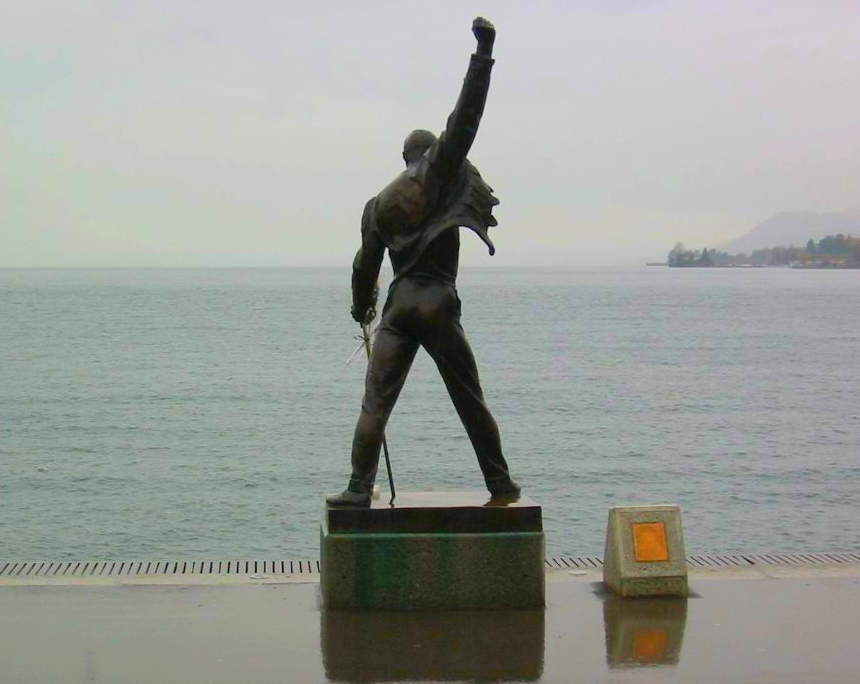
The statue of Freddie Mercury overlooking Lake Geneva in Montreux, Switzerland, which is featured on the cover of the album.

The album was recorded in a much different way from Queen's other studio albums. In early 1991, having completed work on Innuendo, and some months before his death, Freddie Mercury recorded as many vocals as he could, with the instruction to the rest of the band (Brian May, Roger Taylor, and John Deacon) to complete the songs later. Put to tape during this time were primarily "A Winter's Tale", "Mother Love" and what would eventually become "You Don't Fool Me".

In the documentary Champions of the World, May described these sessions with Mercury as such:

By the time we were recording these other tracks after Innuendo, we had had the discussions and we knew that we were totally on borrowed time because Freddie had been told that he would not make it to that point. I think our plan was to go in there whenever Freddie felt well enough, just to make as much use of him as possible, we basically lived in the studio for a while and when he would call and say, 'I can come in for a few hours', our plan was to just make as much use of him as we could, you know he told us, 'Get me to sing anything, write me anything and I will sing it and I will leave you as much as I possibly can.'

Producer David Richards also added:

The thing that was really unusual about these last songs they recorded was that Freddie insisted on doing final vocals. Normally he had always wanted to wait until all the music was completed before he would put his final vocal on. There must have been a reason for this, I think he felt there wasn't enough time to have it completed in time. Which also means that he definitely wanted these things to be released, there's simply no other reason why he would have done that.

After Mercury's death, the band returned to the studio in 1993 to begin work on finishing the tracks. May has described in interviews that Taylor and Deacon had begun some work in 1992, while May was on tour promoting his Back to the Light album. Upon his return in 1993, May felt they were not on the right path with the music and they more or less started from scratch with the three of them working together with producer David Richards.

With less than an album's worth to work with, the band decided to revisit previously recorded material. The band did not discuss whether Mercury had any input before his death regarding which songs might be considered. The idea was to take existing songs on which Mercury sang and rework them as Queen songs.

In 2013, Brian May said about the album "[Made in Heaven] was possibly the best Queen album we ever made. It has so much beauty in it. It was a long, long process, painstakingly put together. A real labour of love."

== Songs ==
=== "It's a Beautiful Day" ===
Years before Mercury started recording solo material, he created a sound clip of himself experimenting on the piano at Musicland Studios in Munich in 1980 during the sessions of The Game. Later, for the use of this album, the song was extended to two minutes and 32 seconds. The more classical section, without Mercury's improvisation, was put together by John Deacon. Near the end, a short orchestral sample from the coda of "La Calinda" by English composer Frederick Delius can clearly be heard.

=== "Made in Heaven" ===
Originally from Mercury's Mr. Bad Guy, this song, along with the other Mercury solo track "I Was Born to Love You", was reworked to a "Queen sound" and Mercury's original vocals were placed over the new music. In an interview with Far Out, May called the song one of his favourite Queen tracks.

=== "Let Me Live" ===
"Let Me Live" is a rock ballad, which features a rare sharing of the vocals between Mercury, May, and Taylor. This track was originally recorded with Rod Stewart during sessions for the 1984 album The Works. Once finished in 1995 for Made in Heaven, Queen made one 11th-hour change to the song to avoid legal action. Part of the backing vocals featured lyrics too closely resembling Erma Franklin's "Piece of My Heart". The potentially problematic section was mixed out and the track was released. Promo cassettes from the US feature the unaltered backing track. Early Mexican and Dutch CD pressings are reported to have this alternate version as well.

=== "Mother Love" ===
"Mother Love" was the final song co-written by Mercury and May, and was also Mercury's last vocal performance. Mercury's vocals for "Mother Love" were recorded 13–16 May 1991. On his website, May discussed the writing process he and Mercury had (writing both separately and together, and conscious of the nature of the song and the lyrics). Upon reaching the final verse, Mercury told May that he had to go and "have a rest", but that he would return later and finish it. Mercury never made it back to the studio due to his worsening condition, thus May sang the last verse on the track.

The song features a sample of the vocal improvisation from Queen's famous 12 July 1986 concert at Wembley Stadium, and a sample from the intro of the studio version of "One Vision" and "Tie Your Mother Down". It also features a sample from a cover of "Goin' Back", a song written by Carole King and Gerry Goffin, for which Mercury had provided lead vocals in 1972. The cover was released as a B-side to "I Can Hear Music", a Ronettes cover, by Larry Lurex (a pseudonym of Mercury's), not long before the release of Queen's debut album. The sound bursts between the sing along and the "Goin' Back" sample are apparently a few milliseconds of every Queen track ever recorded, put together, and then rapidly sped through a tape machine. At the very end of the song, a baby is heard crying. This video is age-restricted on YouTube.

- Official video (using a short film) on YouTube

=== "My Life Has Been Saved" ===
"My Life Has Been Saved" was started as an acoustic track composed mainly by Deacon in 1987–1988. Producer David Richards helped him out doing the demo and the keyboards, then Mercury sang on it, and later on the entire band recorded it. The Made in Heaven version is different from that of 1989 (which originally featured as the B-side to the single "Scandal"), although it uses the same vocals from Mercury. Deacon plays guitar and keyboards as well as his usual instrument, bass guitar.

- Official video (based on short film "O") on YouTube

=== "I Was Born to Love You" ===
"I Was Born to Love You" was originally recorded (piano, vocals, synths) by Mercury on 25 May 1984, for his Mr. Bad Guy album, as a late addition (when told by the record company that the album needed "a single"). May, Taylor and Deacon re-recorded it and added their instruments, turning the song into fast-paced rock, mainly featuring hard rock guitar from May. That track became popular in Japan during 2004 when it was used for the theme song of a television drama named Pride (プライド). This version also contains samples of Mercury's ad-lib vocals from "A Kind of Magic", from the 1986 album of the same name, and from "Living on My Own", from his Mr. Bad Guy album. The music video for this version of the song, also made in 2004, is composed mainly of clips from the Mercury solo video and from Queen: Live at Wembley.

=== "Heaven for Everyone" ===
"Heaven for Everyone" is a track Taylor wrote and tried out with Queen in 1987, although according to some sources it was written with Joan Armatrading in mind to sing it. Whether she turned it down or Taylor withdrew the song is unclear, but it was recorded by his other band The Cross. One night Mercury came to visit The Cross at the studio and after some drinks he gave them ideas of how to sing the song and ended up recording the lead vocals for it. Mercury appeared on the UK version of their album Shove It as guest lead vocalist on the song, with Taylor doing backing vocals. The roles were reversed on the single and the American version of Shove It. Mercury's vocals were then used for the Made in Heaven release, with a couple of different lines and May singing backing vocals instead of Taylor, with Richards adding several arrangement ideas. It was released as the leading single two weeks before the album's release, with the song's music video commemorating Mercury, and also containing footage of various silent films from the 1900s, including Walter R. Booth's 1906 film The '?' Motorist, Georges Méliès' seminal 1902 film A Trip to the Moon as well as his 1904 film The Impossible Voyage.

=== Too Much Love Will Kill You ===
"Too Much Love Will Kill You" was written by Brian May, Frank Musker, and Elizabeth Lamers sometime between the sessions for A Kind of Magic and The Miracle. The song was written in the United States, with Freddie Mercury singing lead vocals on the Queen recording. Due to disputes over the publishing rights held by companies representing Musker and Lamers, the band was unable to clear the song for release on The Miracle at the time. It nonetheless appeared in the album's original proposed track listing, sequenced between "I Want It All" and "The Invisible Man", before being dropped. As a result, it is the only track on Made in Heaven that was not reworked or re-recorded by the surviving band members during the 1993–1995 sessions; the version used is the original 1989 mix intended for The Miracle.

May first performed the song publicly at The Freddie Mercury Tribute Concert in 1992, playing piano and singing lead vocals himself. He subsequently included a solo version on his album Back to the Light (1992), arranged differently from the Queen recording, with an acoustic guitar solo and no drums. Despite this stripped-back studio version, May performed the song live with his touring band during 1992–1993 in an arrangement closer to Queen's original. The song won Best Song Musically and Lyrically at the 1997 Ivor Novello Awards.

In 2003, the song was performed by Queen with Luciano Pavarotti, with Pavarotti singing the latter parts of the verses in Italian.

=== "You Don't Fool Me" ===
"You Don't Fool Me" was one of the last tracks recorded for Made in Heaven. May has explained on his website that producer David Richards more or less created the framework of the song single-handedly, building from unfinished musical ideas and fragments recorded with Mercury's vocals in May 1991 before his death. May has said that before Richards' work, there was no full song to speak of. However, after Richards edited and mixed the song (including a bit of harmonies recorded for "A Winter's Tale") he presented it to the band. May, Taylor and Deacon then added their instruments and backing vocals and were surprised to end up with a finished song that had begun as nothing. The style of the song is reminiscent of their 1982 album Hot Space, and a comment over that featured on their Greatest Hits III album.

=== "A Winter's Tale" ===
"A Winter's Tale" is a ballad written and composed by Mercury at his apartment in Montreux, Switzerland. It is the last complete song Mercury composed on his own (the music for "Mother Love" is by May). It has been branded as one of few Christmas songs from the band, along with "Thank God It's Christmas".

The vocals were laid down months before Mercury's death and the band completed the backing track sometime after. According to the liner notes in the 2011 release, the band finished the song how they thought Mercury would have wanted it.

=== "It's a Beautiful Day (Reprise)" ===
A heavier rock version of "It's a Beautiful Day", that is the same in the beginning but later turns into rock. It contains "Yeah" and samples from "Seven Seas of Rhye".

=== "Yeah" ===
"Yeah" is the shortest song on the album and in Queen's song catalogue, lasting only four seconds. It consists solely of Mercury saying the word "yeah". The origin of the vocal snippet is most commonly attributed to a backing vocal during the second chorus of "Action This Day" from Hot Space, though similarity has been noted to the vocal in the intro of "Don't Try Suicide" from The Game.

=== "13/Untitled" ===
Running at 22 minutes and 32 seconds, "13" began as an experiment by Richards with an Ensoniq ASR-10 sampler. He took the opening chords of "It's a Beautiful Day" and made them loop, and then added Mercury's voice saying "are you running?", Mercury laughing and at the very end Mercury saying "fab", through strange echoes. May and Taylor also added some ideas to the track. This track was previously only available on the CD edition of the album and the aforementioned promo cassettes. This is also the longest track Queen had ever made.

Standard cassettes of the album end with the shortened "It's a Beautiful Day (Reprise)", fading out after Track 12 ("Yeah"), where this untitled track would continue on.

The LP (vinyl) edition of the album has only the first few seconds, which run into the run-off of the groove on the record, which means that if a listener has a record player which does not have an automatic stop activated at this point, said notes will play indefinitely.

The album's last listed track (all formats) is track 11: "It's a Beautiful Day (Reprise)". In 2015, upon the re-issuing of Queen's discography on vinyl, Made in Heaven was re-issued as a double disc set with track 13 taking up the entirety of side D. The track was given the name "13" and is listed on the artwork.

== Critical reception ==
Professional ratings
Review scores
Source	Rating
AllMusic	2/5 stars
Cash Box	(favourable)
Entertainment Weekly	B+
The Guardian	(favourable)
Los Angeles Times	1.5/4 stars
MusicHound Rock	3.5/5 stars
Music Week	3/5 stars
Q	(favourable)
Smash Hits	2/5 stars
The Sunday Times	(favourable)

Made in Heaven received generally positive reviews from music critics. Critics praised its upbeat nature and quality of music after the death of Mercury.

Q magazine wrote: "Ten new tracks (and one reprise). No filler. No shame. An essential purchase for Queen fans, certainly, but even without its special significance, Made in Heaven is probably a better album than Innuendo and a fitting swan song by one of the most incandescent groups in rock. Made in Heaven is also the last musical will and testament of a star who was never going to be turned into a saint, but whose grandstanding performances were, right to the very end, always marked by reckless enthusiasm and a rare generosity of spirit."

The Sunday Times described the album as "essential listening".

Entertainment Weekly wrote: "It's the perfect theatrical epitaph for a life dedicated to gorgeous artifice."

The Guardian stated: "When a band have the controls permanently set at full-tilt, as Queen did, burn-out is inevitable, for the listener, if not for the band. When we eventually reach the drum-crashing finale, 'It's a Beautiful Day', which kicks in with Mercury's umpteenth randy-rottweiler howl, it feels as if far more than 70 minutes has passed. That's where the aforesaid lyrics save the day. Predominantly written by Mercury, they are effectively farewell notes. He poured out his heart, and his words have a throat-aching poignance. Even the record's opening verse assumes a painful significance."

Jerusalem Post wrote: "Somehow Mercury and Queen's ability to make a joyful noise in the face of pain and death makes this a very comforting album to have around in shaky times."

The Times stated: "[There are not] any obviously half-baked, or patched-up numbers. Most, however, are as good as anything that Queen came up with in their later years. How good that is, as always with Queen, is largely a matter of taste. 'Mother Love', the last recording that Mercury made, is a song of truly heartfelt pathos. Despite its overdue delivery, Made in Heaven stands up remarkably well as the closing chapter in a spectacular pop odyssey."

AllMusic wrote: "Made in Heaven harked back to Queen's 1970s heyday with its strong melodies and hard rock guitar playing, topped by Mercury's bravura singing and some of the massed choir effects familiar from 'Bohemian Rhapsody'. Even if one did not know that these songs were sung in the shadow of death, that subject would be obvious. The lyrics were imbued with life-and-death issues, from the titles. The odd thing about this was that Mercury's over-the-top singing had always contained a hint of camp humour, and it continued to here, even when the sentiments clearly were as heartfelt as they were theatrically overstated. Maybe Mercury was determined to go out the same way he had come in, as a diva. If so, he succeeded."

== Legacy ==
=== Popular culture ===
The album inspired the makers of the Resident Evil series of video games to have certain characters in the game, such as Claire Redfield and Chris Redfield, wear jackets/vests with the words 'Made in Heaven' written on the back, with Chris' jacket as part of an unlockable outfit from the first game, and Claire as part of her default outfit from the second game. Claire would also wear a vest with the legend 'Let Me Live' on the back for a later game in the series, as well as on the jacket for her alternate unlockable costume in Resident Evil 2. The male lead of Resident Evil 0, Billy Coen, has an arm-length tattoo which says 'Mother Love', another song from the album.

It was also the name of Enrico Pucci's final Stand in JoJo's Bizarre Adventure Part 6: Stone Ocean.

== Track listing ==
The tracks with asterisks are credited to Queen. All lead vocals by Freddie Mercury except where noted.

=== CD ===
No.	Title	Writer(s)	Lead vocals	Length
1.	"It's a Beautiful Day" (*)	Freddie Mercury		2:32
2.	"Made in Heaven"	Mercury		5:25
3.	"Let Me Live" (*)	Mercury; Roger Taylor; Brian May; John Deacon	Mercury with Roger Taylor and Brian May	4:45
4.	"Mother Love"	Mercury; May	Mercury with May	4:49
5.	"My Life Has Been Saved" (*)	Deacon		3:15
6.	"I Was Born to Love You"	Mercury		4:49
7.	"Heaven for Everyone"	Taylor	Mercury with May	5:36
8.	"Too Much Love Will Kill You"	May; Frank Musker; Elizabeth Lamers		4:20
9.	"You Don't Fool Me" (*)	Mercury; Deacon		5:24
10.	"A Winter's Tale" (*)	Mercury		3:49
11.	"It's a Beautiful Day" (reprise) (*)	Mercury		3:01
12.	"Yeah" (hidden track) (*)	Mercury	Spoken word by Mercury	0:04
13.	"13" (hidden track) (*)	May; Taylor; David Richards	Instrumental	22:32
Total length:				70:21

2011 bonus EP
No.	Title	Length
1.	"Heaven for Everyone" (single version)	4:39
2.	"It's a Beautiful Day" (single version)	3:58
3.	"My Life Has Been Saved" (1989 version)	3:16
4.	"I Was Born to Love You" (vocal and piano version)	2:55
5.	"Rock in Rio Blues" (Live B-side to "A Winter's Tale")	4:33
6.	"A Winter's Tale" (Cosy Fireside mix)	3:49
Total length:		23:10

2011 iTunes deluxe edition bonus videos
No.	Title	Length
7.	"Heart-ache (Too Much Love Will Kill You)" (promo video)	5:56
8.	"Heaven for Everyone" (promo video)	4:30
9.	"Outside-In (A Winter's Tale)" (promo video)	3:58
Total length:		36:54

=== 1995 LP ===
Two tracks on the vinyl version of Made in Heaven had to be edited to fit on one vinyl disc. These two tracks are "I Was Born to Love You" and "You Don't Fool Me". Also, the version of "Heaven for Everyone" included on the vinyl version is the single version.

Side one
No.	Title	Writer(s)	Length
1.	"It's a Beautiful Day"	Mercury	2:32
2.	"Made in Heaven"	Mercury	5:25
3.	"Let Me Live"	Mercury; Taylor	4:45
4.	"Mother Love"	Mercury; May	4:49
5.	"My Life Has Been Saved"	Deacon	3:15
Total length:			20:46

Side two
No.	Title	Writer(s)	Length
1.	"I Was Born to Love You"	Mercury	4:25
2.	"Heaven for Everyone" (single version)	Taylor	4:43
3.	"Too Much Love Will Kill You"	May; Musker; Lamers	4:20
4.	"You Don't Fool Me"	Mercury; Deacon	4:46
5.	"A Winter's Tale"	Mercury	3:49
6.	"It's a Beautiful Day" (reprise)	Mercury	3:01
7.	"Yeah" (unlisted)	Mercury	0:15
Total length:			25:19

=== 2015 LP ===
Made in Heaven was reissued on vinyl on 25 September 2015, alongside all of Queen's other studio albums. This is the first time that the complete album was released on vinyl, spread across 2 LPs. Track 13 is also presented on vinyl for the first time, listed as "13" on the artwork, and taking up all of side four.

Side 1
No.	Title	Writer(s)	Length
1.	"It's a Beautiful Day"	Mercury	2:32
2.	"Made in Heaven"	Mercury	5:25
3.	"Let Me Live"	Mercury; Taylor	4:45
4.	"Mother Love"	Mercury; May	4:46
Total length:			17:28

Side 2
No.	Title	Writer(s)	Length
1.	"My Life Has Been Saved"	Deacon	3:15
2.	"I Was Born to Love You"	Mercury	4:51
3.	"Heaven for Everyone"	Taylor	5:34
Total length:			13:40

Side 3
No.	Title	Writer(s)	Length
1.	"Too Much Love Will Kill You"	May; Musker; Lamers	4:20
2.	"You Don't Fool Me"	Mercury; Deacon	5:23
3.	"A Winter's Tale"	Mercury	3:49
4.	"It's a Beautiful Day" (reprise)	Mercury	3:00
5.	"Yeah" (unlisted)	Mercury	0:11
Total length:			16:43

Side 4
No.	Title	Writer(s)	Length
1.	"13"	May; Taylor; Richards	22:32
Total length:			22:32

== Personnel ==
Track numbering refers to CD and digital releases of the album.

Queen

- Freddie Mercury – vocals, piano, keyboards, drum machine on "Mother Love"
- Brian May – guitars, keyboards, vocals
- Roger Taylor – drums, percussion, keyboards, vocals
- John Deacon – bass guitar, keyboards, additional guitar

Additional personnel

- Rebecca Leigh-White, Gary Martin, Catherine Porter, Miriam Stockley – backing vocals (3)
- David Richards – keyboards (5, 8, 13), co-production, engineering, mixing supervision
- Justin Shirley-Smith – co-production, engineering
- Josh Macrae – co-production, engineering
- Ashley Alexander – engineering
- Reinhold Mack – recording of additional material in the '80s
- Kevin Metcalfe – mastering
- Richard Gray – artwork, cover photograph of Irena Sedlecká's Mercury sculpture in Montreux

== Charts ==
=== Weekly charts ===
1995–1996 weekly chart performance for Made in Heaven
Chart (1995–1996)	Peak position
Australian Albums (ARIA)	3
Austrian Albums (Ö3 Austria)	1
Belgian Albums (Ultratop Flanders)	2
Belgian Albums (Ultratop Wallonia)	2
Canada Top Albums/CDs (RPM)	18
Danish Albums (Hitlisten)	1
Dutch Albums (Album Top 100)	1
European Albums (Billboard)	1
Finnish Albums (Suomen virallinen lista)	1
French Albums (SNEP)	2
German Albums (Offizielle Top 100)	1
Hungarian Albums (MAHASZ)	3
Italian Albums (Musica e Dischi)	1
Japanese Albums (Oricon)	10
New Zealand Albums (RMNZ)	1
Norwegian Albums (VG-lista)	2
Scottish Albums (OCC)	2
Spanish Albums (PROMUSICAE)	1
Swedish Albums (Sverigetopplistan)	1
Swiss Albums (Schweizer Hitparade)	1
UK Albums (Official Charts)	1
US Billboard 200	58

2022 weekly chart performance for Made in Heaven
Chart (2022)	Peak position
Polish Albums (ZPAV)	32

2026 weekly chart performance for Made in Heaven
Chart (2026)	Peak position
Greek Albums (IFPI)	98

=== Year-end charts ===
1995 year-end chart performance for Made in Heaven
Chart (1995)	Position
Australian Albums Chart	42
Austrian Albums Chart	13
European Albums Charts	48
French Albums Chart	10
German Albums Chart	24
New Zealand Albums Chart	31
Spanish Albums Chart	47
Swedish Albums Chart	64
UK Albums Chart	7

1996 year-end chart performance for Made in Heaven
Chart (1996)	Position
Austrian Albums Chart	10
European Albums Chart	8
French Albums Chart	32
German Albums Chart	9
Japanese Albums Chart	92
Swiss Albums Chart	18
UK Albums Chart	68

== Certifications and sales ==
Certifications and sales for Made in Heaven
Region	Certification	Certified units/sales
Argentina (CAPIF)	2× Platinum	120,000^{^}
Australia (ARIA)	Platinum	70,000^{^}
Austria (IFPI Austria)	2× Platinum	100,000^{*}
Belgium (BRMA)	Platinum	50,000^{*}
Brazil	—	70,000
Canada (Music Canada)	Platinum	100,000^{^}
Czech Republic	2× Platinum	100,000
Denmark (IFPI Danmark)	Platinum	50,000
Finland (Musiikkituottajat)	Platinum	50,668
France (SNEP)	2× Platinum	600,000^{*}
Germany (BVMI)	3× Platinum	1,500,000^{^}
Hong Kong (IFPI Hong Kong)	Platinum	20,000^{*}
Italy	—	490,000
Japan (RIAJ)	Platinum	336,782
Mexico (AMPROFON)	Gold	100,000^{^}
Netherlands (NVPI)	2× Platinum	200,000^{^}
New Zealand (RMNZ)	3× Platinum	45,000^{^}
Norway (IFPI Norway)	Platinum	50,000^{*}
Poland (ZPAV) original release	Platinum	128,000
Poland (ZPAV) 2008 Agora SA album reissue	Platinum	20,000^{*}
Portugal (AFP)	2× Platinum	80,000^{^}
Singapore (RIAS)	Gold	7,500
South Africa (RISA)	Platinum	50,000^{*}
South Korea (KMCA)	Platinum	30,000
Spain (Promusicae)	2× Platinum	200,000^{^}
Switzerland (IFPI Switzerland)	3× Platinum	150,000^{^}
United Kingdom (BPI)	4× Platinum	1,200,000^{^}
United States (RIAA)	Gold	500,000^{^}
Summaries
Europe (IFPI)	5× Platinum	5,000,000^{*}
^{*} Sales figures based on certification alone.^{^} Shipments figures based on certification alone.

== See also ==
- List of best-selling albums in Germany
