= A Mother's Love =

A Mother's Love may refer to:

- A Mother's Love (1929 film), a 1929 German silent drama film
- A Mother's Love (1939 film), a 1939 German drama film
- A Mother's Love (1950 film), a 1950 Japanese drama film
- "A Mother's Love", an episode of Folklore
- ""A Mother's Love", a track by Amall Mallick from the 2021 Indian film Saina
