= Made in Heaven (song) =

1985 single by Freddie Mercury

Single by Freddie Mercury

from the album Mr. Bad Guy
- B-side: "She Blows Hot and Cold"; "Made In Heaven" (single version) (Note: On the 12-inch single, the extended version of "Made In Heaven" is on the A-side, while the B-side includes the single version of "Made In Heaven" and an extended version of "She Blows Hot and Cold".)
- Released: 1 July 1985
- Recorded: 1984
- Studio: Musicland Studios, West Germany
- Length: 4:05 (album version); 4:08 (single version); 4:50 (extended version)
- Label: Columbia
- Songwriter: Freddie Mercury
- Producers: Reinhold Mack; Freddie Mercury

Freddie Mercury singles chronology
| "I Was Born to Love You" (1985) | "Made in Heaven" (1985) | "Living on My Own" (1985) |

Music video
- "Made in Heaven" on YouTube

"Made in Heaven"

Song by Queen

from the album Made in Heaven
- Published: Queen Music Ltd.
- Released: 6 November 1995
- Recorded: 1984, 1993–1995
- Length: 5:25
- Label: Parlophone; Hollywood
- Songwriter: Freddie Mercury
- Producer: Queen

"Made in Heaven" is the third single recorded by Freddie Mercury, and his fourth release as a solo artist. Originally featured in Mercury's first solo album, Mr. Bad Guy, the song was modified and published as a 45 rpm single paired with "She Blows Hot and Cold", described on the record sleeve as 'A Brand New Track'. The single reached No. 57 on the UK Singles Chart.

After Mercury's death, the song's title gave the name to Queen's 1995 album Made in Heaven. The song was also chosen, along with "I Was Born to Love You", to be re-recorded for the album, with the previous vocals mixed into a newly recorded instrumental track.

== Personnel ==
Original version

- Freddie Mercury – lead vocals, piano, synthesiser
- Fred Mandel – piano, synthesiser, rhythm guitar
- Paul Vincent – lead guitar
- Curt Cress – drums
- Stephan Wissnet – bass guitar, Fairlight CMI
- Reinhold Mack – Fairlight CMI

Queen version

- Freddie Mercury – lead vocals, piano, keyboards
- Brian May – guitars
- Roger Taylor – drums, percussion
- John Deacon – bass guitar

== Releases and track listing ==
The single was released in 7-inch and 12-inch format.

7-inch single release

| No. | Title | Length |
|---|---|---|
| 1. | "Made in Heaven (single version)" | 4:09 |
| 2. | "She Blows Hot and Cold" | 3:30 |

The 7-inch single was also released as a shaped picture disc.

12-inch single release

| No. | Title | Length |
|---|---|---|
| 1. | "Made in Heaven (extended version)" | 4:50 |
| 2. | "Made in Heaven (single version)" | 4:09 |
| 3. | "She Blows Hot and Cold (extended version)" | 6:46 |

== Music video ==
The song's video was directed by David Mallet, previously involved in the making of the music video for "I Was Born to Love You", as well as five Queen clips. A Royal Opera House replica was built inside a warehouse in North London (as normal studios did not have high enough roofs), where Mercury wanted to recreate scenes from Igor Stravinsky's The Rite of Spring and Dante's Inferno. The most remarkable element is probably the 67-foot (20-metre) tall rotating globe, on top of which the singer stands in the last part of the video clip. The outfit that Mercury wears in this music video is quite similar to the outfit worn in the music video for the Queen single "Radio Ga Ga". Mallet and Mercury used the 1952 film The Importance of Being Earnest as inspiration, for the set.

== Charts ==
| Chart (1985) | Peak position |
|---|---|
| Australia (Kent Music Report) | 98 |
| Belgium (Ultratop 50 Flanders) | 36 |
| Germany (GfK) | 60 |
| Ireland (IRMA) | 30 |
| UK Singles (Official Charts) | 57 |

== See also ==
- Mr. Bad Guy
- Made in Heaven
- Made in Heaven (JoJo's Bizarre Adventure)
