= You Don't Fool Me =

1996 single by Queen

- Artwork for Holland release

Single by Queen

from the album Made in Heaven
- Released: 26 February 1996
- Recorded: 1991-1995
- Genre: Dance rock
- Length: 5:25 (album version); 3:54 (single version)
- Label: Parlophone
- Songwriter: Queen
- Producers: Queen, David Richards

Queen singles chronology
| "Let Me Live" (1996) | "You Don't Fool Me" (1996) | "No-One but You (Only the Good Die Young)" (1997) |

Music video
- "You Don't Fool Me" on YouTube

"You Don't Fool Me" is a song by British rock band Queen from their 15th and final studio album, Made in Heaven (1995). It was released as a single in February 1996, by Parlophone, in Europe and in November 1996 in the United Kingdom, containing various remixes of the song. The song is one of the few which were actually written and recorded after the Innuendo sessions, and was written and composed by the band, under David Richards' supervision. The song was a top-20 sales chart hit or close to in several European nations, and an airplay chart topper in some of them.

== Background ==
"You Don't Fool Me" was one of the last tracks recorded for the album Made in Heaven and came about in a most unusual way. Brian May has explained on his website that all they had were unfinished musical fragments & ideas recorded with Freddie Mercury during his final sessions in Montreux in May 1991 prior to his death. There was no full song to speak of until the Made in Heaven sessions, when co-producer David Richards helped edit these musical ideas together to create the song, creating a basic framework. The remaining band members – May, John Deacon and Roger Taylor – contributed further ideas, and fleshed out the track with instrumentation & backing vocals. The style of the song is reminiscent of their 1982 album Hot Space, and a comment over that featured on their Greatest Hits III album.

== Music video ==
The video is set in a night club where a young man encounters his former girlfriend and recounts the memories of their brief relationship. The theme of the song could possibly be a continuation of the story set up by earlier Queen songs "Play the Game" and "It's a Hard Life".

== Track listings ==
=== Original version ===
CD single

1. "You Don't Fool Me" (edit) – 3:54
2. "You Don't Fool Me" (album version) – 5:25

CD maxi

1. "You Don't Fool Me" (album version) – 5:25
2. "You Don't Fool Me" (edit) – 3:54
3. "You Don't Fool Me" (Sexy Club Mix) – 10:18
4. "You Don't Fool Me" (Dancing Divaz Club Mix) – 7:07

12-inch maxi – Europe

1. "You Don't Fool Me" (Sexy Club Mix)
2. "You Don't Fool Me" (Dancing Divaz Club Mix)
3. "You Don't Fool Me" (B.S. Project Remix)
4. "You Don't Fool Me" (Dancing Divaz Instrumental club mix)

12-inch maxi – U.S.

1. "You Don't Fool Me" (Freddy's Club Mix) – 7:02
2. "You Don't Fool Me" (album version) – 5:24
3. "You Don't Fool Me" (Freddy's Revenge Dub) – 5:53
4. "You Don't Fool Me" (Queen for a Day mix) – 6:33

=== Remixes ===
CD single

1. "You Don't Fool Me" (B.S. Project remix – edit) – 3:15
2. "You Don't Fool Me" (edit) – 4:40

CD maxi – UK release only

1. "You Don't Fool Me" (album version) – 5:24
2. "You Don't Fool Me" (Dancing Divaz Club Mix) – 7:05
3. "You Don't Fool Me" (Sexy Club mix) – 10:53
4. "You Don't Fool Me" (Late Mix) – 10:34

12-inch maxi – UK release only

1. "You Don't Fool Me" (Dancing Divaz Club Mix) – 7:05
2. "You Don't Fool Me" (Late Mix) – 10:34
3. "You Don't Fool Me" (Sexy Club Mix) – 10:53
4. "You Don't Fool Me" (album version) – 5:24

Cassette single

1. "You Don't Fool Me" (album version) – 5:24
2. "You Don't Fool Me" (Dancing Divaz Club Mix) – 7:05

The Sexy Club Mix is the nearly the same on all formats. The UK CD and 12-inch versions list the wrong time of 10:53, when it should only be 10:18 like the other formats list it. The UK CD version has a mastering error and the first four seconds are lost, bringing the running time down to 10:14.

== Personnel ==
- Freddie Mercury — lead and backing vocals
- Brian May — electric and acoustic guitars
- Roger Taylor — drums, percussion, keyboards, backing vocals
- John Deacon — bass guitar

== Charts ==
=== Weekly charts ===
| Chart (1996) | Peak position |
|---|---|
| Austria (Ö3 Austria Top 40) | 23 |
| Belgium (Ultratop 50 Flanders) | 13 |
| Belgium (Ultratop 50 Wallonia) | 14 |
| Europe Airplay (European Hit Radio) | 7 |
| Europe Sales (Eurochart Hot 100) | 27 |
| Europe (ACE Top 25) | 2 |
| France (SNEP) | 14 |
| France Airplay (Music & Media) | 2 |
| Germany (GfK) | 26 |
| Ireland (IRMA) | 23 |
| Italy (Musica e dischi) | 24 |
| Netherlands (Dutch Top 40) | 21 |
| Netherlands (Single Top 100) | 22 |
| Poland Airplay (Music & Media) | 1 |
| Spain Airplay (Music & Media) | 1 |
| Sweden (Sverigetopplistan) | 52 |
| Switzerland (Schweizer Hitparade) | 27 |
| UK Singles (Official Charts) Remixes | 17 |
| UK Pop Tip Club Chart (Music Week) | 2 |

=== Year-end charts ===
| Chart (1996) | Position |
|---|---|
| Belgium (Ultratop 50 Flanders) | 58 |
| Belgium (Ultratop 50 Wallonia) | 70 |
| Germany (Media Control) | 90 |
