= Flash (Queen song) =

1980 song by Queen

- UK single picture sleeve

Single by Queen

from the album Flash Gordon
- B-side: "Football Fight"
- Released: 24 November 1980
- Recorded: October 1980
- Genre: Hard rock
- Length: 3:29 (album version); 2:48 (single version)
- Label: EMI
- Songwriter: Brian May
- Producers: Brian May; Reinhold Mack

Queen singles chronology
"Need Your Loving Tonight" (1980)	"Flash" (1980)	"Under Pressure" (1981)

Music video
- "Flash" on YouTube

"Flash" is a song by British rock band Queen. Written by guitarist Brian May, "Flash" is the theme song of the 1980 film Flash Gordon.

There are two versions of the song. The album version ("Flash's Theme") is in fact the start to the film, with all the dialogue from the first scene. The single version contains dialogue cut from various parts of the film, including Brian Blessed's character Prince Vultan exclaiming "Gordon's alive?!" and Melody Anderson's character Dale Arden saying, "Flash! Flash I love you, but we only have fourteen hours to save the Earth!" This version was also included on the Greatest Hits compilation from 1981.

The song's lead vocals are shared by May and Freddie Mercury, with Roger Taylor adding high harmonies. May plays most of the instruments, except for the bass guitar and drums. He used an Imperial Bösendorfer piano (with 97 keys instead of 88, having an extra octave on the low range), an Oberheim OB-X synthesizer (as seen in the song's music video), and his homemade Red Special electric guitar.

The song reached number 10 on the UK Singles Chart and number three in Germany. On the U.S. charts, "Flash's Theme aka Flash" reached number 42 on the Billboard Hot 100. It peaked at number 39 on the Cash Box Top 100.

Record World described the single version as a "supersonic cut with a chorus hook guaranteed to rescue tired holiday ears."

== Music video ==
The music video was filmed at Advision Studios, London, in November 1980 and directed by Don Norman and shows the band performing the song to a screen showing clips from the film Flash Gordon. An alternative version broadcast during the Concert for Kampuchea in 1981 with different clips included on the Flash Gordon 2011 iTunes edition.

== Personnel ==
- Freddie Mercury – lead and backing vocals
- Brian May – lead and backing vocals, guitars, piano, synthesizer
- Roger Taylor – drums, backing vocals, timpani
- John Deacon – bass guitar

== Charts ==
Chart (1980–1981)	Peak position
Australia (Kent Music Report)	16
Austria (Ö3 Austria Top 40)	1
Belgium (Ultratop 50 Flanders)	19
Canada RPM Top Singles	24
Germany (GfK)	3
Ireland (IRMA)	10
Italy (Musica e dischi)	14
Netherlands (Dutch Top 40)	18
Netherlands (Single Top 100)	13
New Zealand (Recorded Music NZ)	32
Spain (AFYVE)	24
Sweden (Sverigetopplistan)	17
UK Singles (Official Charts)	10
US Billboard Hot 100	42
US Cash Box Top 100	39

== Sales and certifications ==
Region	Certification	Certified units/sales
United Kingdom (BPI)	Silver	250,000^{^}
^{^} Shipments figures based on certification alone.

== Vanguard remix ==
"Flash"

Single by Queen + Vanguard
- B-side: "Jam" (Vanguard)
- Released: 10 February 2003
- Length: 3:03 (radio mix)
- Label: Frisbee Tracks; Virgin; Nebula
- Songwriter: Brian May
- Producer: Vanguard

Queen singles chronology
"We Will Rock You" (2000)	"Flash" (2003)	"Another One Bites the Dust (The Miami Project Remixes)" (2006)

Audio
- "Flash" on YouTube

German producers Vanguard released a cover of "Flash", credited to "Queen + Vanguard", on 10 February 2003. The single peaked at number 15 on the UK Singles Chart, number two on the UK Dance Chart, and number 17 in Germany.

=== Charts ===
Chart (2003)	Peak position
Australia (ARIA)	95
Austria (Ö3 Austria Top 40)	44
Belgium (Ultratip Bubbling Under Flanders)	2
Belgium Dance (Ultratop Flanders)	12
Europe (Eurochart Hot 100)	44
Germany (GfK)	17
Scotland Singles (Official Charts)	15
UK Singles (Official Charts)	15
UK Dance (Official Charts)	2
UK Indie (Official Charts)	1

== Live recording ==
- Queen on Fire – Live at the Bowl
- Queen Rock Montreal

== In other media ==
The song is played during an ice dancing routine in the 2007 film Blades of Glory.

The song is played in The Flash sixth season episode "Into the Void" where Cisco Ramon (Carlos Valdes) plays it when Barry Allen / The Flash (Grant Gustin) enters a black hole to save Chester P. Runk (Brandon McKnight), mentioning that he has been saving the song "for the right moment".

In 2016, a re-recording of the song was used to advertise Flash Multi Surface Concentrated Cleaner in the UK. It has since been used to promote other Flash products. In 2022, the song appeared in a Toyota Corolla Cross commercial in Australia but it used "Cross" instead of "Flash".
