= Flash Gordon (soundtrack) =

Studio album / Soundtrack album by Queen
- Released: 8 December 1980
- Recorded: February–March; October–November 1980
- Studios: Townhouse (London); Music Center (London); Advision (London)
- Genres: Rock; progressive electronic
- Length: 35:11
- Labels: EMI; Elektra
- Producers: Brian May; Reinhold Mack

Queen chronology
The Game (1980)	Flash Gordon (1980)	Greatest Hits (1981)

Queen studio album chronology
The Game (1980)	Flash Gordon (1980)	Hot Space (1982)

Singles from Flash Gordon
- 1. "Flash" Released: 24 November 1980

Flash Gordon is the first soundtrack album and ninth studio album by the British rock band Queen, released on 8 December 1980 by EMI Records in the UK and on 27 January 1981 by Elektra Records in the US. It is one of two film soundtracks that they produced, along with Highlander, although technically Highlander has not been released as an album soundtrack.

It is the soundtrack to the science fiction film Flash Gordon and features lyrics on only two tracks. "Flash's Theme" was the only single to be released from the album, under the title "Flash". The album reached number 10 on the UK charts and number 23 on the US Billboard 200.

The album was reissued worldwide on 27 June 2011 (excluding the US and Canada, where it was released on 27 September) as part of the band's 40th anniversary. The reissue adds an EP of related tracks.

Unlike most soundtrack albums, audio from the film is prominently used in the theme song and the score selections of the album.

Professional ratings
Review scores
Source	Rating
AllMusic	3.5/5 stars
Chicago Tribune	1/4 stars
Encyclopedia of Popular Music	2/5 stars
The Guardian	3/5 stars
MusicHound Rock	woof!
Record Mirror	5/5 stars
The Rolling Stone Album Guide	2/5 stars
Smash Hits	2/10
Uncut	3/5 stars

== Track listing ==
All tracks are instrumental unless noted.

Side one
No.	Title	Writer(s)	Lead vocals	Length
1.	"Flash's Theme"	Brian May	Freddie Mercury and Brian May	3:31
2.	"In the Space Capsule (The Love Theme)"	Roger Taylor		2:43
3.	"Ming's Theme (In the Court of Ming the Merciless)"	Freddie Mercury		2:41
4.	"The Ring (Hypnotic Seduction of Dale)"	Mercury		0:57
5.	"Football Fight"	Mercury		1:28
6.	"In the Death Cell (Love Theme Reprise)"	Taylor		2:25
7.	"Execution of Flash"	John Deacon		1:06
8.	"The Kiss (Aura Resurrects Flash)"	Mercury; Howard Blake (Film score, not credited)		1:45

Side two
No.	Title	Writer(s)	Lead vocals	Length
1.	"Arboria (Planet of the Tree Men)"	Deacon		1:42
2.	"Escape from the Swamp"	Taylor		1:43
3.	"Flash to the Rescue"	May	Mercury	2:44
4.	"Vultan's Theme (Attack of the Hawk Men)"	Mercury		1:13
5.	"Battle Theme"	May		2:18
6.	"The Wedding March"	Richard Wagner (arr. May)		0:56
7.	"Marriage of Dale and Ming (And Flash Approaching)"	May; Taylor	Mercury	2:04
8.	"Crash Dive on Mingo City"	May		1:00
9.	"Flash's Theme Reprise (Victory Celebrations)"	May	Mercury and May	1:24
10.	"The Hero"	May; Blake (Film score, not credited)	Mercury	3:31
Total length:				35:11

- Track 1 listed as "Man" on the 1982 US LP, 5E-518-B
- Track 6 based on "Bridal Chorus"

Bonus track (1991 Hollywood Records CD reissue)
No.	Title	Writer(s)	Length
19.	"Flash's Theme" (1991 remix by Mista Lawnge, 9.5)	May	6:43
Total length:			41:54

Disc 2: Bonus EP (2011 Universal Music CD reissue)
No.	Title	Writer(s)	Length
1.	"Flash" (Single Version)	May	2:48
2.	"The Hero" (October 1980... Revisited)	May	2:55
3.	"The Kiss" (Early Version, March 1980)	Mercury; Blake	1:11
4.	"Football Fight" (Early version, no synths! – February 1980)	Mercury	1:55
5.	"Flash" (Live at the Montreal Forum, November 1981)	May	2:12
6.	"The Hero" (Live at the Montreal Forum, November 1981)	May	1:48
Total length:			12:49

Bonus videos (2011 iTunes deluxe edition)
No.	Title	Writer(s)	Length
7.	"Flash/The Hero" (live at Morumbi Stadium, São Paulo, March 1981)	May	3:28
8.	"Flash" (Alternative Promo Video)	May	3:17
9.	"Flash" (Vanguard Mix Promo Video)	May	3:17
Total length:			22:11

== Personnel ==
Personnel taken from Flash Gordon liner notes.

Queen

- Freddie Mercury – lead vocals, synthesisers
- Brian May – lead guitar, vocals, synthesisers, piano on "Flash's Theme" and "The Hero", organ on "The Wedding March"
- John Deacon – bass guitar, guitar, synthesisers
- Roger Taylor – drums, vocals, synthesisers

Additional personnel

- Brian May – production
- Mack – production, mix-down engineering, original recordings on "The Hero"
- Alan Douglas – mix-down engineering, original recordings (all except "The Hero")
- Howard Blake – additional orchestral arrangements, conducting
- John Richards – orchestra recordings
- Eric Tomlinson – orchestra recordings
- Neil Preston – Queen photos
- Cream – artworks

== Charts ==
=== Weekly charts ===
Weekly chart performance for Flash Gordon
Chart (1980–81)	Peak position
Australian Albums (Kent Music Report)	29
Austrian Albums (Ö3 Austria)	1
Canada Top Albums/CDs (RPM)	11
Dutch Albums (Album Top 100)	7
German Albums (Offizielle Top 100)	2
Japanese Albums (Oricon)	12
Norwegian Albums (VG-lista)	25
Swedish Albums (Sverigetopplistan)	29
UK Albums (Official Charts)	10
US Billboard 200	23

=== Year-end ===
Chart (1981)	Position
Austrian Albums (Ö3 Austria)	13
German Albums (Offizielle Top 100)	15

== Certifications ==
Region	Certification	Certified units/sales
Canada (Music Canada)	Gold	50,000^{^}
Japan (RIAJ)	Gold	100,000^{^}
Poland (ZPAV)	Platinum	20,000^{*}
United Kingdom (BPI)	Gold	100,000^{^}
^{*} Sales figures based on certification alone.^{^} Shipments figures based on certification alone.
