= Back to the Light =

Studio album by Brian May
- Released: 28 September 1992
- Recorded: 1988–1992
- Studio: Allerton Hill
- Genre: Hard rock
- Length: 51:12
- Label: Parlophone (UK); Hollywood (US)
- Producer: Brian May; Justin Shirley-Smith

Brian May chronology
Star Fleet Project (1983)	Back to the Light (1992)	Live at the Brixton Academy (1994)

United States cover

Singles from Back to the Light
- 1. "Driven by You" Released: 25 November 1991; 2. "Too Much Love Will Kill You" Released: 24 August 1992; 3. "Back to the Light" Released: 9 November 1992; 4. "Resurrection" Released: 7 June 1993; 5. "Last Horizon" Released: 6 December 1993

Back to the Light is the debut solo studio album by English musician Brian May, the guitarist of Queen. It was released on 28 September 1992 by Parlophone Records in the UK, and on 2 February 1993 by Hollywood Records in the US and Canada. May's second solo release following his 1983 EP Star Fleet Project, Back to the Light was co-produced with Justin Shirley-Smith and recorded between March 1988 and November 1992 at Allerton Hill — May's home studio — and mixed at Metropolis Studios.

The album contains two top 10 singles – "Too Much Love Will Kill You" and "Driven by You" – and peaked at number six on the UK Albums Chart and at number 159 on the US Billboard 200.

"Headlong" and "I Can't Live with You", released on Innuendo, were originally intended for Back to the Light; but when May heard Freddie Mercury singing the songs, he decided they would be recorded by Queen.

== Songs ==
"The Dark" is the album's "short keyboard and guitar intro," "an atmospheric opener...recorded during sessions for Flash Gordon in 1980 at Anvil Studios with orchestrations by Howard Blake." The lyrics are reminiscent of a lullaby.

"Back to the Light" is "an outpouring of emotion," and was first performed live on The Tonight Show, 5 April 1993. The Time Traveller music video, released as part of the re-released album in 2021, features May travelling back in time to his younger self.

"Love Token", "a well-constructed track", is dominated by Cozy Powell's "thunderous drums[, which] give the song its catchy rhythm .... The song was performed live on the Back to the Light Tour, usually after 'Back to the Light' (on the 1992 leg) or 'Tie Your Mother Down' (during the first part of 1993), before becoming an abridged intro to 'Headlong', as evident on the ... album Live At The Brixton Academy." The original "explicit" version was never officially released, and was only found on a free CD packaged with Rock Compact Disc Magazine, Vol. 4, 1991. The lyrics speak of a family splitting apart.

"Resurrection" is a duet between Powell's drum and May's guitar work and vocals, a tribute to a friendship which would be cut short by Powell's premature death in 1998. It was initially recorded as 'Ride to Win' on Cozy Powell's 1992 solo album, The Drums Are Back. "The lyrics feature few references to organized religion, being of a more personal nature, as elsewhere on Back to the Light, [May] channels his confusion of life without [Mercury] into song." The music video features May and Powell playing their instruments, and lots of early CGI graphics.

"Too Much Love Will Kill You" was recorded by Queen for The Miracle and rejected over songwriting royalties, eventually being released in 1995 on Made in Heaven. May performed the song unaccompanied except for piano during The Freddie Mercury Tribute Concert. A guitar version "was released as part of the CD single in August 1992."

"Driven by You", Brian's famed Ford advert theme, was released on 25 November 1991. Three different versions were recorded and used—"all sounding similar and lasting ninety seconds each", and three different DJ cuts were made.

"Nothin' But Blue" was "initially recorded as 'Somewhere In Time' on Cozy Powell's 1992 solo album, The Drums Are Back,...with John [Deacon] on bass". May used the instrumental from that session and added original lyrics to create the version heard on his solo album.

"I'm Scared" is a very personal hard-rocker, one of May's ways of dealing with his depression brought on by his failed first marriage and the death of his father. The version that appears on Back to the Light includes what is called "the 'Chaos Karaoke', a litany of fears" which include "fear of losing control, pain, being unknown, being ugly, dying, [being] deformed, [being] dull, the dark, being found out[,] and...being scared of Stephen Berkoff".

"Last Horizon" was recorded at Allerton Studios in 1988, and is one of May's favorite songs.

"Let Your Heart Rule Your Head", "an unconscious update of...'39....an uplifting, upbeat moment on an album of otherwise bleak and melancholy songs".

"Just One Life" could be misinterpreted as a tribute to Mercury, "but was actually written for actor Philip Sayer". May was inspired to write the song after attending a memorial concert for Sayer, whom May had never met.

"Rollin' Over" is May's cover of the Small Faces' song. "In [May's] hands...the song becomes a scorching tour de force of guitar riffs and exploding drums, turning [it] into what might as well be an outtake from one of Queen's earlier albums (indeed, Smile played it in their touring days)".

== Release ==
The US edition of the album included a bonus track remix of "Driven by You" (with a new drum track by Cozy Powell and new bass by Neil Murray), issued elsewhere as a B-side to "Too Much Love Will Kill You". The Japanese edition included instrumental "Guitar Versions" of "Just One Life" and "Too Much Love Will Kill You".

In June 2021, May announced that the album would be reissued as part of the Brian May Gold Series, packaged with a second disc of bonus tracks titled Out of the Light. The reissue was released on 6 August 2021.

== Critical reception ==
Professional ratings
Review scores
Source	Rating
AllMusic	3/5 stars
Calgary Herald	C
MusicHound Rock	3.5/5 stars
The Philadelphia Inquirer	2/4 stars
Rolling Stone	3/5 stars

The Chicago Tribune wrote that "trademark riffs brighten 'Back to the Light', 'Nothin' but Blue' drips notes of languorous splendor, and May stretches out on the straightforward arena rock of 'Rollin' Over'."

== Track listing ==
All tracks are written by Brian May, except where noted.

No.	Title	Writer(s)	Length
1.	"The Dark"		2:20
2.	"Back to the Light"		4:59
3.	"Love Token"		5:55
4.	"Resurrection"	May; Cozy Powell; Jamie Page	5:27
5.	"Too Much Love Will Kill You"	May; Elizabeth Lamers; Frank Musker	4:28
6.	"Driven by You"		4:11
7.	"Nothin' But Blue"	May; Powell; Geoff Nicholls; Steve Makin	3:31
8.	"I'm Scared" (Justin's Mix '92)		4:00
9.	"Last Horizon"		4:10
10.	"Let Your Heart Rule Your Head"		3:51
11.	"Just One Life"		3:38
12.	"Rollin' Over" (includes reprise of "The Dark")	Ronnie Lane; Steve Marriott	4:36
Total length:			51:06

Bonus track on the US and Canadian editions
No.	Title	Length
13.	"Driven by You" (Radio Mix)	4:10

Bonus tracks on the Japanese edition
No.	Title	Length
13.	"Just One Life" (guitar version)	3:37
14.	"Too Much Love Will Kill You" (guitar version)	4:30

2021 reissue Out of the Light bonus disc
No.	Title	Writer(s)	Length
1.	"Nothin' But Blue" (guitar version)	May; Powell; Nicholls; Makin	3:50
2.	"Too Much Love Will Kill You" (guitar version)	May; Lamers; Musker	4:30
3.	"Just One Life" (guitar version)		3:37
4.	"Driven by You Two"		2:32
5.	"Driven by You" (Ford Ad version)		1:31
6.	"Tie Your Mother Down" (with Slash, live on The Tonight Show, April '93)		3:27
7.	"Too Much Love Will Kill You" (live in Los Angeles, April '93)	May; Lamers; Musker	4:42
8.	"'39/Let Your Heart Rule Your Head" (live at the Brixton Academy, June '93)		4:33
9.	"Last Horizon" (live at the Brixton Academy, June '93)		3:14
10.	"We Will Rock You" (live at the Brixton Academy, June '93)		4:46
11.	"Driven by You" (Cozy and Neil Version '93)		4:10

== Personnel ==
=== Musicians ===
- Brian May – lead vocals, lead and rhythm guitar, bass, piano, keyboards, programming, backing vocals.
- Cozy Powell – drums (2–4, 7–8, 13)
- Geoff Dugmore – drums (10, 12)
- Gary Tibbs – bass (2, 10, 12)
- Neil Murray – bass (3, 8)
- John Deacon – bass (7)
- Mike Moran – piano (3, 12), keyboards (9)
- Don Airey – keyboards (extra) (4, 7)
- Gill O'Donovan – backing vocals (2, 10)
- Maggie Ryder – backing vocals (2, 12)
- Miriam Stockley – backing vocals (2, 12)
- Suzie O' List – backing vocals (2, 10)
- Chris Thompson – backing vocals (12)

=== Technical ===
- Justin Shirley-Smith – co-producer, engineer
- Heidi Cannavo, Noel Haris – engineer (assistant)
- Kevin Metcalfe – mastering
- Brian Zellis – technical assistance, programming
- David Richards – programming
- Bob Ludwig – 2021 remastering

== Singles ==
1. "Driven by You" / "Just One Life" (November 1991) – No. 6
2. "Too Much Love Will Kill You" / "I'm Scared" (August 1992) – No. 5
3. "Back to the Light" / "Nothin' But Blue" (November 1992) – No. 19
4. "Resurrection" / "Love Token" / "Too Much Love Will Kill You" (Live) (June 1993) – No. 23
5. "Last Horizon" / "Let Your Heart Rule Your Head" (Live) (December 1993) – No. 51

== Charts ==
=== Weekly charts ===
Chart (1992–1993)	Peak position
Australian Albums (ARIA)	94
Austrian Albums (Ö3 Austria)	20
Dutch Albums (Album Top 100)	11
German Albums (Offizielle Top 100)	25
Hungarian Albums (MAHASZ)	17
Japanese Albums (Oricon)	45
New Zealand Albums (RMNZ)	36
Swedish Albums (Sverigetopplistan)	25
Swiss Albums (Schweizer Hitparade)	11
UK Albums Chart (OCC)	6
US Billboard 200	159

Chart (2021)	Peak position
Austrian Albums (Ö3 Austria)	20
Belgian Albums (Ultratop Flanders)	52
Belgian Albums (Ultratop Wallonia)	7
Dutch Albums (Album Top 100)	60
German Albums (Offizielle Top 100)	10
Irish Albums (IRMA)	59
Japanese Albums (Oricon)	21
Italian Albums (FIMI)	89
Polish Albums (ZPAV)	48
Swiss Albums (Schweizer Hitparade)	9
UK Albums (OCC)	7
US Top Album Sales (Billboard)	42

=== Year-end charts ===
Chart (1992)	Position
Dutch Albums (Album Top 100)	78

== Certifications ==
Region	Certification	Certified units/sales
Netherlands (NVPI)	Gold	50,000^{^}
United Kingdom (BPI)	Gold	100,000^{^}
^{^} Shipments figures based on certification alone.
