= Mother Love (song) =

Song by Queen

from the album Made in Heaven
- Published: Queen Music Ltd.
- Released: 6 November 1995
- Recorded: May 1991, 18 October 1993 – early 1995 at Mountain Studios, Cosford Mill and Metropolis Studios
- Genre: Rock
- Length: 4:49
- Label: Parlophone (Europe); Hollywood (North America)
- Songwriters: Freddie Mercury; Brian May
- Producer: Queen

Music video
- "Mother Love" on YouTube

"Mother Love" is a song by Queen, from the album Made in Heaven, released in 1995 after Freddie Mercury's death in 1991. It was written by Mercury and Brian May. Mercury recorded two out of three verses before becoming too sickly to continue recording, so May recorded the final verse himself later.

== Background ==
"Mother Love" was the final song co-written by Mercury and May, and was also Mercury's last vocal performance. Mercury's vocals were recorded between 13–16 May 1991 after the Innuendo sessions.

On his website, May discussed the writing process he and Mercury had (writing both separately and together, and conscious of the nature of the song and the lyrics), the statement that he made, "And Freddie at that time said 'Write me stuff... I know I don't have very long; keep writing me words, keep giving me things I will sing, then you can do what you like with it afterwards, you know; finish it off' and so I was writing on scraps of paper these lines of 'Mother Love', and every time I gave him another line he'd sing it, sing it again, and sing it again, so we had three takes for every line, and that was it... and we got the last verse and he said 'I'm not up to this, and I need to go away and have a rest, I'll come back and finish it off...' and he never came back". The last part of the song was sung by May.

Close to the end of the song, it features a sample from the vocal improvisation recorded at Queen's famous 12 July 1986 concert at Wembley Stadium, and a sample from the intro of the studio version of "One Vision" and "Tie Your Mother Down". Afterwards, a snippet of every Queen song ever recorded can be heard, put together and then rapidly sped through a tape machine.

Concluding the song is a sample from a cover of "Goin' Back", a song written by Carole King and Gerry Goffin, for which Mercury had provided lead vocals in 1972. The cover was released as a b-side to "I Can Hear Music", a Ronettes cover, by Larry Lurex (a pseudonym of Mercury's), not long before the release of Queen's debut album. As the song fades out, there is a baby heard crying.

== Personnel ==
- Freddie Mercury – lead vocals, drum machine
- Brian May – guitars, lead vocals on last verse, keyboards
- John Deacon – bass guitar
- Roger Taylor – drums
