= Too Much Love Will Kill You =

1988 song by Queen

Single by Brian May

from the album Back to the Light
- B-side: "I'm Scared"
- Released: 24 August 1992
- Recorded: 1988–1992
- Length: 4:26
- Label: Parlophone
- Songwriters: Brian May; Frank Musker; Elizabeth Lamers
- Producers: Brian May; Justin Shirley-Smith

Brian May singles chronology
"Driven by You" (1991)	"Too Much Love Will Kill You" (1992)	"Back to the Light" (1992)

"Too Much Love Will Kill You" is a song written by British guitarist Brian May of Queen, Frank Musker and Elizabeth Lamers. The song reflected the breakdown of May's first marriage and attraction to his future wife, Anita Dobson. It was first recorded by Queen around 1988 or before, and was intended to be on the band's The Miracle album in 1989, but did not make the cut due to legal disputes following the band's decision that all songs on the album would be written by the group as opposed to individuals.

After Freddie Mercury's death in 1991, May arranged a solo version, which he performed at the Freddie Mercury Tribute Concert in 1992, and subsequently included on his solo album Back to the Light that same year. When released as a single, it reached number five on the UK Singles Chart, number two in Belgium, and topped the charts in the Netherlands.

Since it was first played publicly at the Freddie Mercury Tribute Concert, a common misconception is that the song was written as a tribute to Freddie Mercury, although it had actually been written several years before he died, and Mercury sang the lead vocal on the Queen version, which was featured on the band's final studio album, Made in Heaven (1995).

== Track listings ==
- 7-inch and cassette single

A. "Too Much Love Will Kill You" – 4:29
B. "I'm Scared" – 4:00

- UK CD single
1. "Too Much Love Will Kill You"
2. "I'm Scared"
3. "Too Much Love Will Kill You" (guitar version)
4. "Driven by You" (new version)

== Personnel ==
- Brian May – lead and backing vocals, piano, keyboard, acoustic and electric guitar

== Charts ==
=== Weekly charts ===
Chart (1992)	Peak position
Australia (ARIA)	18
Austria (Ö3 Austria Top 40)	20
Belgium (Ultratop 50 Flanders)	2
Europe (Eurochart Hot 100)	10
Europe (European Hit Radio)	2
Germany (GfK)	30
Ireland (IRMA)	7
Netherlands (Dutch Top 40)	1
Netherlands (Single Top 100)	1
New Zealand (Recorded Music NZ)	10
Norway (VG-lista)	4
Portugal (AFP)	8
Sweden (Sverigetopplistan)	26
Switzerland (Schweizer Hitparade)	26
UK Singles (Official Charts)	5
UK Airplay (Music Week)	5

=== Year-end charts ===
Chart (1992)	Position
Belgium (Ultratop)	27
Europe (Eurochart Hot 100)	70
Europe (European Hit Radio)	22
Netherlands (Single Top 100)	11
UK Singles (OCC)	45
UK Airplay (Music Week)	65

== Certifications ==
Region	Certification	Certified units/sales
Netherlands (NVPI)	Gold	50,000^{^}
United Kingdom (BPI)	Silver	200,000^{^}
^{^} Shipments figures based on certification alone.

== Release history ==
Region	Date	Format(s)	Label(s)	Ref.
United Kingdom	24 August 1992	7-inch vinyl; CD; cassette	Parlophone	
Australia	5 October 1992	CD; cassette	Parlophone; EMI	
Japan	11 November 1992	Mini-CD	EMI	

== Queen version ==
"Too Much Love Will Kill You"
- Artwork for UK release

Single by Queen

from the album Made in Heaven
- B-side: "We Will Rock You"; "We Are the Champions"
- Released: 5 December 1995
- Length: 4:20
- Label: Parlophone
- Songwriters: Brian May; Frank Musker; Elizabeth Lamers
- Producer: Queen with David Richards

Queen singles chronology
"I Was Born to Love You" (1996)	"Too Much Love Will Kill You" (1995)	"Let Me Live" (1996)

A version of this song was recorded with Mercury on vocals. In 1995, four years after his death, the remaining members of Queen elected to include the original recording of "Too Much Love Will Kill You", with Mercury's vocals, on their 15th and final studio album, Made in Heaven. Queen's version was released in the United States in December 1995 and was issued in the United Kingdom two months later. This version reached number 15 on the UK Singles Chart, number 19 on Canada's RPM 100 Hit Tracks chart, and number 18 on the US Billboard Bubbling Under Hot 100.

Although it failed to duplicate the chart success of May's solo version, Queen's version of the song has since come to be regarded as the definitive version, after being awarded "Best Song Musically and Lyrically" at the 1996 Novello Awards (May said later that if there was one song that he would have wanted to win an award for, it was this one), and being included on Queen's Greatest Hits III.

=== Critical reception ===
Steve Baltin from Cash Box wrote, "One of the last remnants of the late, great Freddie Mercury, the first single from the band’s new Made in Heaven album is vintage Mercury. After the wimpy opening that could’ve come from Styx or Chicago, Mercury's grandiose vocals kick in, eclipsing the lame melody. Hearing Mercury again, especially in such fine form vocally, is a surprisingly touching experience."

=== Track listings ===
- 7-inch single

A1. "Too Much Love Will Kill You" – 4:20
B1. "We Will Rock You" – 2:00
B2. "We Are the Champions" – 3:00

- CD single
1. "Too Much Love Will Kill You" – 4:20
2. "Spread Your Wings" – 4:32
3. "We Will Rock You" – 2:00
4. "We Are the Champions" – 3:00
- US single

A. "Too Much Love Will Kill You" – 4:20
B. "Rock in Rio Blues" (live in Rio, January 1985) – 4:29

=== Personnel ===
- Freddie Mercury – lead vocals, piano
- Brian May – guitars, keyboards, backing vocals
- Roger Taylor – drums, backing vocals
- John Deacon – bass guitar
- David Richards – keyboards, keyboard programming

=== Charts ===
Chart (1995–1996)	Peak position
Belgium (Ultratip Bubbling Under Flanders)	10
Canada Top Singles (RPM)	19
Canada Adult Contemporary (RPM)	25
Europe (Eurochart Hot 100)	41
Ireland (IRMA)	28
Scottish Singles Sales (Official Charts)	11
UK Singles (Official Charts)	15
US Bubbling Under Hot 100 (Billboard)	18

=== Certifications ===
Region	Certification	Certified units/sales
United Kingdom (BPI) Sales since 2004	Silver	200,000^{‡}
^{‡} Sales+streaming figures based on certification alone.

=== Release history ===
Region	Date	Format(s)	Label(s)	Ref.
United States	21 November 1995	Contemporary hit radio	Hollywood	
United States	5 December 1995	CD	Hollywood	
United Kingdom	26 February 1996	CD; cassette	Parlophone	

== Music videos ==
The video for the Brian May version of the song was directed by David Mallet and features May singing the song to the camera, and is intercut with footage from various home movies. The video for the Queen version of the song was directed by DoRo and is a montage-style video of clips mainly from live performances and promo videos, and uses the Promo Edit version of the song.

== Other versions ==
In 1992, Brian May performed "Too Much Love Will Kill You" at the first Pavarotti & Friends concert in Modena in Italy.

In 2003, May again performed a rendition of "Too Much Love Will Kill You", this time as a duet with Luciano Pavarotti, at the tenor's benefit concert held in Modena, Italy.
