= Let Me Live =

- Artwork for UK release

Single by Queen

from the album Made in Heaven
- B-side: "Fat Bottomed Girls"; "Bicycle Race"
- Released: 17 June 1996
- Recorded: 1983, 1993–1995
- Genre: Rock, gospel
- Length: 4:45
- Label: Parlophone (Europe)
- Songwriter: Queen
- Producer: Queen

Queen singles chronology
"Too Much Love Will Kill You" (1996)	"Let Me Live" (1996)	"You Don't Fool Me" (1996)

"Let Me Live" is a song by British rock band Queen, from the 1995 album Made in Heaven. Freddie Mercury, Roger Taylor and Brian May share lead vocals, with Mercury singing the first verse, Taylor singing the second verse and bridge, and May singing the last verse. During the choruses, all of the band members sing (except for bass player John Deacon), as well as a background choir, giving it a gospel sound reminiscent of the band's 1976 single "Somebody to Love". The single reached No. 9 on the UK Singles Chart, becoming the band's last top 10 hit in that country.

== History ==
Freddie Mercury stated in an interview that this song was originally recorded with Rod Stewart in 1983. It was suggested that this song was intended to be on Queen's The Works album in 1984. (Note: The book "Queen Uncovered" shows a picture from The Works-sessions listing a track called "Take Another Piece of my Heart") Some backing lyrics in the version intended for release on Made in Heaven had to be changed due to copyright problems, because it resembled a line from "Piece of My Heart". The first Mexican and Dutch pressings of the album, however, had the original version. The song peaked at No. 9 on the UK singles chart. According to the Queen website, BBC Radio 1 did not playlist this song.

== Track listing ==
CD single – part one: 1996 digital remaster
No.	Title	Length
1.	"Let Me Live"	4:46
2.	"Fat Bottomed Girls"	4:15
3.	"Bicycle Race"	3:00
4.	"Don't Stop Me Now"	3:30

CD single – part two: BBC session, February 1973
No.	Title	Length
1.	"Let Me Live"	4:46
2.	"My Fairy King"	4:07
3.	"Doing All Right"	4:13
4.	"Liar"	6:30

CD single (from The Singles Collection 4): Live at Wembley '86
No.	Title	Length
1.	"Let Me Live"	4:46
2.	"We Will Rock You"	2:57
3.	"We Are the Champions"	4:04

== Personnel ==
Queen

- Freddie Mercury — lead vocals on first verse, piano
- Brian May — lead vocals on final verse, backing vocals, guitars, keyboards
- Roger Taylor — lead vocals on second verse and bridge, backing vocals, drums, percussion
- John Deacon — bass guitar

Additional musicians

- Rebecca Leigh-White — backing vocals
- Gary Martin — backing vocals
- Catherine Porter — backing vocals
- Miriam Stockley — backing vocals

== Alternate version ==
- Made in Heaven – The Film's Edit (0:29) (on the DVD only, on the 'Song Select' screen) (an edit of the album version from 0:25 to 0:55, fading out over three seconds)

== Charts ==
Chart (1996)	Peak position
Germany (GfK)	67
Netherlands (Dutch Top 40)	36
Netherlands (Single Top 100)	28
UK Singles (Official Charts)	9
UK Rock & Metal (Official Charts)	1
