= Freddie Mercury discography =

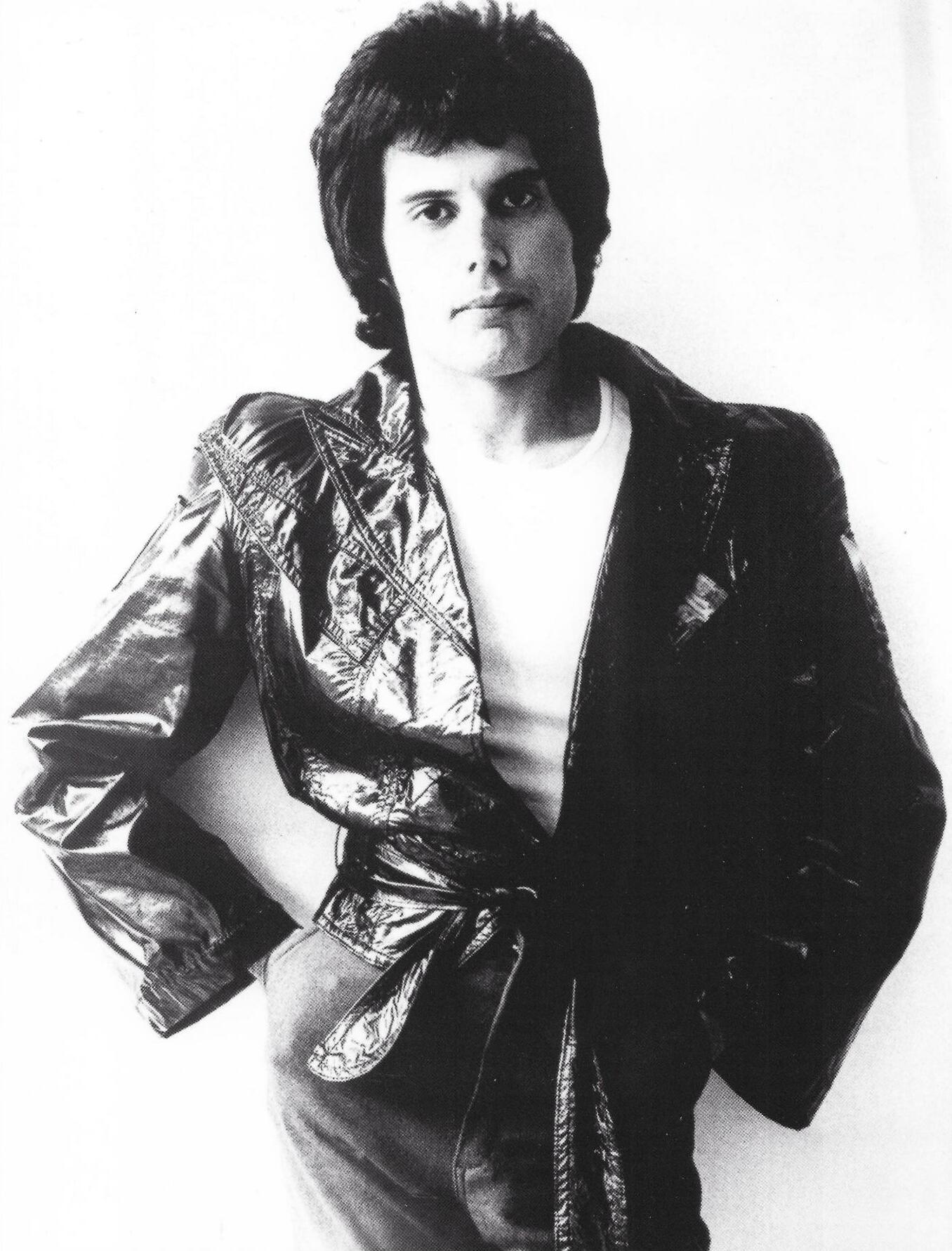
- Mercury in 1977
- Studio albums: 1
- Compilation albums: 8
- Singles: 16
- Music videos: 7
- Box sets: 2
- Collaborative albums: 1

As well as his work with Queen, Freddie Mercury released one solo album, one collaborative album, and several singles. Although his solo work was not as commercially successful as most Queen albums, the two off-Queen albums and several of the singles debuted in the top 10 of the UK Music Charts. Following Mercury's death in 1991, several posthumous box sets and compilation albums have been released.

Mercury's first solo effort goes back to 1972 under the pseudonym Larry Lurex, when Trident Studios' house engineer Robin Geoffrey Cable was working in a musical project, at the time when Queen were recording their debut album; Cable enlisted Mercury to perform lead vocals on the songs "I Can Hear Music" and "Goin' Back", both were released together as a single in 1973. Eleven years later, Mercury contributed to the soundtrack for the restoration of the 1927 Fritz Lang film Metropolis. The song "Love Kills" was written for the film by Giorgio Moroder in collaboration with Mercury, and produced by Moroder and Mack; in 1984 it debuted at the number 10 position in the UK Singles Chart.

Mercury's two full albums outside the band were Mr. Bad Guy (1985) and Barcelona (1988). His first album, Mr. Bad Guy, debuted in the top ten of the UK Album Charts. In 1993, a remix of "Living on My Own", a single from the album, posthumously reached number one on the UK Singles Charts. The song also garnered Mercury a posthumous Ivor Novello Award from the British Academy of Songwriters, Composers and Authors. AllMusic critic Eduardo Rivadavia describes Mr. Bad Guy as "outstanding from start to finish" and expressed his view that Mercury "did a commendable job of stretching into uncharted territory". In particular, the album is heavily synthesiser-driven; that is not characteristic of previous Queen albums.

His second solo-effort album outside of Queen, Barcelona, recorded with Spanish soprano vocalist Montserrat Caballé, combines elements of popular music and opera. Many critics were uncertain what to make of the album; one referred to it as "the most bizarre CD of the year". The collaborative album was a commercial success, and the album's title track debuted at No. 8 in the UK and was also a hit in Spain. The title track received massive airplay as the official anthem of the 1992 Summer Olympics (held in Barcelona one year after Mercury's death). Caballé sang it live at the opening of the Olympics with Mercury's part played on a screen, and again before the start of the 1999 UEFA Champions League Final between Manchester United and Bayern Munich in Barcelona.

In addition to the two solo albums, Mercury released several singles, including his own version of the hit "The Great Pretender" by the Platters, which debuted at No. 5 in the UK in 1987. In September 2006 a compilation album featuring Mercury's solo work was released in the UK in honour of what would have been his 60th birthday. The album debuted in the UK top 10. In 2012, Freddie Mercury: The Great Pretender, a documentary film directed by Rhys Thomas on Mercury's attempts to forge a solo career, premiered on BBC One.

In 1981–1983 Mercury recorded several tracks with Michael Jackson, including a demo of "State of Shock", "Victory", and "There Must Be More to Life Than This". None of these collaborations were officially released at the time, although bootleg recordings exist. Jackson went on to record the single "State of Shock" with Mick Jagger for the Jacksons' album Victory. Mercury included the solo version of "There Must Be More To Life Than This" on his Mr. Bad Guy album. "There Must Be More to Life Than This" was eventually reworked by Queen and released on their compilation album Queen Forever in 2014. In addition to working with Michael Jackson, Mercury and Roger Taylor sang on the title track for Billy Squier's 1982 studio release, Emotions in Motion and later contributed to two tracks on Squier's 1986 release, Enough Is Enough, providing vocals on "Love is the Hero" and musical arrangements on "Lady With a Tenor Sax". In 2020, Mercury's music video for "Love Me Like There's No Tomorrow" was nominated for Best Animation at the Berlin Music Video Awards. Woodlock studio is behind the animation.

== Albums ==
=== Studio albums ===
List of studio albums, with selected chart positions
| Title | Album details | Peak chart positions | | | | | | | | Certifications |
| Title | Album details | UK | AUS | AUT | GER | NLD | NOR | SWE | SWI | Certifications |
|---|---|---|---|---|---|---|---|---|---|---|
| Mr. Bad Guy | Released: 29 April 1985; Label: Columbia | 6 | 38 | 23 | 11 | 17 | 13 | 20 | 14 | UK: Gold |

=== Collaborative albums ===
List of studio albums, with selected chart positions
| Title | Album details | Peak chart positions | | | | | | | | | Certifications |
| Title | Album details | UK | AUS | AUT | GER | ITA | NLD | NZ | SWE | SWI | Certifications |
|---|---|---|---|---|---|---|---|---|---|---|---|
| Barcelona (with Montserrat Caballé) | Released: 10 October 1988; Label: Polydor | 15* | 200 | 24 | 41 | 52 | 10 | 13 | 37 | 18 | UK: Silver; SWI: Platinum |

- Barcelona 1992 chart position. It originally charted at number 25 in the UK in 1988.

=== Compilation albums ===
| Year | Title | Peak chart positions | | | | | | | | | | Certifications (sales thresholds) |
| Year | Title | UK | AUT | GER | ITA | NLD | NZ | NOR | SWE | SWI | FRA | Certifications (sales thresholds) |
|---|---|---|---|---|---|---|---|---|---|---|---|---|
| 1992 | The Freddie Mercury Album: Released: 16 November 1992; Label: Parlophone | 4 | 2 | 3 | 1 | 9 | 4 | 12 | 35 | 8 | 6 | UK: 2× Platinum; ARG: Platinum; AUT: Platinum; FIN: Gold; FRA: 2× Platinum; GER: Platinum; SWE: Gold; SWI: Platinum |
| 1992 | The Great Pretender: Released: 24 November 1992 (US); Label: Hollywood | — | — | — | — | — | — | — | — | — | — | |
| 1993 | Remixes: Released: December 1993; Label: Parlophone | — | 25 | 22 | 2 | 83 | — | — | — | 18 | — | |
| 2000 | Solo: Released: 7 November 2000; Label: Parlophone | 13 | 36 | 55 | — | 21 | — | — | — | 42 | — | UK: Gold |
| 2006 | Lover of Life, Singer of Songs — The Very Best of Freddie Mercury Solo: Released: 4 September 2006; Label: Parlophone | 6 | 7 | 13 | 1 | 30 | — | 8 | 14 | 16 | — | UK: Gold |
| 2012 | Barcelona: Special Edition (with Montserrat Caballé): Released: 11 September 2012; Label: Island | 129 | — | — | — | — | — | — | — | — | — | |
| 2016 | Messenger of the Gods: The Singles: Released: 2 September 2016; Label: Mercury | 31 | 24 | 33 | — | 27 | — | — | — | 53 | — | |
| 2019 | Never Boring: Released: 11 October 2019; Label: Mercury | 18 | 21 | 23 | — | 54 | — | — | — | 9 | — | |
"—" denotes a release that did not chart.

== Box sets ==
| Year | Album details | Notes |
|---|---|---|
| The Solo Collection | Released: 23 October 2000; Label: Parlophone; Format: 10 CD / 2 DVD | The box set includes Freddie Mercury's both studio albums, The Great Pretender compilation, singles, rarities and interviews. DVDs include music videos and interviews. |
| Never Boring | Released: 11 October 2019; Label: Parlophone; Format: 3 CD / 1 BD | The box set includes special editions of Freddie Mercury's studio albums, Mr. Bad Guy, Barcelona, compilation album Never Boring and a Blu-ray-disc with music videos. |

== Singles ==
| Year | Song | Peak chart Positions | | | | | | | | | | Certifications (sales thresholds) | Album |
| Year | Song | UK | AUS | AUT | GER | IRE | NLD | BEL | NZ | SWI | US | Certifications (sales thresholds) | Album |
|---|---|---|---|---|---|---|---|---|---|---|---|---|---|
| 1973 | "I Can Hear Music" / "Goin' Back" (as Larry Lurex) | — | — | — | — | — | — | — | — | — | — | | Non-album single |
| 1984 | "Love Kills" | 10 | 56 | 9 | 25 | 4 | 24 | 17 | — | 27 | 69 | | Metropolis: The Original Motion Picture Soundtrack |
| 1985 | "I Was Born to Love You" | 11 | 19 | 20 | 17 | 7 | 22 | 35 | — | 24 | 76 | | Mr. Bad Guy |
| 1985 | "Made in Heaven" | 57 | 98 | — | 60 | 30 | — | 36 | — | — | — | | Mr. Bad Guy |
| 1985 | "Living on My Own" | 50 | — | — | — | — | — | — | — | — | — | | Mr. Bad Guy |
| 1985 | "Love Me Like There's No Tomorrow" | 76 | — | — | — | — | — | — | — | — | — | | Mr. Bad Guy |
| 1986 | "Time" | 32 | — | — | — | 12 | — | — | — | — | — | | Dave Clark's "Time": The Album |
| 1987 | "The Great Pretender" | 4 | 54 | — | 26 | 2 | 11 | 6 | 1 | — | — | | Non-album single |
| 1987 | "Barcelona" (with Montserrat Caballé) | 8 | 85 | — | 47 | 8 | 37 | — | — | — | — | | Barcelona |
| 1988 | "The Golden Boy" (with Montserrat Caballé) | 86 | — | — | — | — | — | — | — | — | — | | Barcelona |
| 1989 | "Guide Me Home/How Can I Go On" (with Montserrat Caballé) | 95 | — | — | — | — | — | — | — | — | — | | Barcelona |
| 1992 | "Barcelona" [re-release] (with Montserrat Caballé) | 2 | 42 | — | 32 | 3 | 2 | 21 | 2 | 8 | — | | Barcelona / The Freddie Mercury Album |
| 1992 | "Guide Me Home/How Can I Go On" [re-release] (with Montserrat Caballé) | — | — | — | — | — | — | — | — | — | — | | Barcelona |
| 1992 | "In My Defence" | 8 | — | — | — | 12 | — | — | — | — | — | | The Freddie Mercury Album |
| 1993 | "The Great Pretender" [re-release] | 29 | 127 | 26 | 38 | — | 21 | — | 36 | 15 | — | | The Freddie Mercury Album |
| 1993 | "Living on My Own" (Remix) | 1 | 115 | 2 | 2 | 1 | 2 | 2 | — | 2 | — | UK: Gold | Remixes |
| 2000 | "Guide Me Home" (with Montserrat Caballé) | — | — | — | — | — | 70 | — | — | — | — | | Barcelona / Solo |
| 2006 | "Love Kills" (Sunshine People Remix) | — | — | — | 83 | — | 49 | — | — | 98 | — | | Lover of Life, Singer of Songs |
| 2019 | "Time Waits for No One" | — | — | — | — | — | — | — | — | — | — | | Never Boring |
"—" denotes releases that did not chart.

== Collaborations and guest appearances ==
- 1975: All four members of Queen helped produce a session with the soul band Trax. Nothing was ever released.
- 1976: "Man from Manhattan" by Eddie Howell – Mercury sang backing vocals, played piano and produced this track. Brian May also played guitar.
- 1976: "You Nearly Did Me In" by Ian Hunter – Mercury sang backing vocals on this song, from the album All-American Alien Boy.
- 1978: "Never Let Her Slip Away", a UK top five hit for Andrew Gold, saw Mercury perform harmony vocals as an uncredited background singer.
- 1982: "Emotions in Motion" by Billy Squier – Mercury sang backing vocals on this song, from album of same name. Also on the 1996 Billy Squier anthology Reach for the Sky.
- 1983: "Victory", "There Must Be More to Life Than This" and "State of Shock" were recorded by Mercury and Michael Jackson, but their original takes were never released. Demos and samples from the latter two have, however, turned up on bootlegs. Later, Mercury reworked "There Must Be More to Life Than This" into his solo album Mr. Bad Guy, and Jackson re-recorded "State of Shock" with Mick Jagger. Popular rumours dictate that a Queen version of "Victory" exists, but this has not surfaced anywhere yet. Queen's 2014 compilation Queen Forever included a brand new arrangement of "There Must Be More to Life Than This" featuring cuts from Jackson's vocal track.
- 1986: "Love Is the Hero" by Billy Squier – Mercury sang backing vocals on this song from the album Enough Is Enough. Mercury sings the intro on the 12" single, and also co-wrote and co-produced the track "Lady with a Tenor Sax", from the same album. Both also appear on the 1996 Billy Squier anthology Reach for the Sky.
- 1987: "Hold On", duet with Jo Dare – Mercury co-wrote this song from the German soundtrack of The Crack Connection.
- 1988: "Heaven for Everyone" by The Cross – Mercury sang lead vocals on the LP version, backing vocals on the single version (or the version on the US album) from the album Shove It.

== Videos ==
=== Video albums ===
| Year | Video details |
|---|---|
| 2012 | Freddie Mercury: The Great Pretender: Released: September 2012; Format: DVD, Blu-ray, Digital download |

=== Music videos ===
| Year | Title | Director | Album |
|---|---|---|---|
| 1985 | "I Was Born to Love You" | David Mallet | Mr. Bad Guy |
| 1985 | "Made in Heaven" | David Mallet | Mr. Bad Guy |
| 1985 | "Living on My Own" | Hannes Rossacher and Rudi Dolezal | Mr. Bad Guy |
| 1986 | "Time"/"Time Waits for No One" | Dave Clark | Time/Never Boring |
| 1987 | "The Great Pretender" (Original and extended versions) | David Mallet | non-album |
| 1987 | "Barcelona" (with Montserrat Caballé) (2 versions) | David Mallet | Barcelona |
| 2019 | "Love Me Like There's No Tomorrow" | Esteban Bravo and Beth David | Mr. Bad Guy |
