= Lover of Life, Singer of Songs =

Greatest hits album by Freddie Mercury
- Released: 4 September 2006
- Recorded: 1973–1988
- Genres: Rock, pop rock, opera
- Length: 151:57
- Label: EMI
- Producer: Various

Freddie Mercury chronology
The Solo Collection (2000)	Lover of Life, Singer of Songs (2006)	Messenger of the Gods: The Singles (2016)

Professional ratings
Review scores
Source	Rating
Allmusic	4/5 stars

Lover of Life, Singer of Songs (with the subtitle The Very Best of Freddie Mercury Solo) is a compilation album of Freddie Mercury's solo songs. It was released (except in the U.S.) on 4 September 2006, the day before Mercury's 60th Birthday. It was released on 21 November 2006 in the U.S., three days before the 15th anniversary of Mercury's death.

== Content ==
The album was released in both a single disc and limited edition double disc format. A 2-disc DVD was released to accompany the CD. The DVD contained "The Untold Story" documentary on Disc 1, and various music videos on Disc 2.

== Singles ==
The song Love Kills [Sunshine People Remix], remixed by Blank & Jones, was released as a single.

== Track listing ==
=== CD ===
Disc one
No.	Title	Writer(s)	Producer(s)	Length
1.	"In My Defence" (2000 Remix)	Dave Clark; David Soames; Jeff Daniels	Clark; Reinhold Mack; Freddie Mercury	3:55
2.	"The Great Pretender" (Original 1987 Single Version)	Buck Ram	Mercury; Michael Moran; David Richards	3:27
3.	"Living on My Own" (1993 Radio Mix)	Mercury	Mack; Mercury; Serge Ramaekers^{[a]}; Colin Peter^{[a]}; Carl Ward^{[a]}	3:38
4.	"Made in Heaven"	Mercury	Mack; Mercury	4:05
5.	"Love Kills" (Original 1984 Single Version)	Mercury; Giorgio Moroder	Mercury; Moroder; Mack	4:29
6.	"There Must Be More to Life Than This"	Mercury	Mack; Mercury	3:00
7.	"Guide Me Home" (with Montserrat Caballé)	Mercury; Moran	Mercury; Moran; Richards	2:50
8.	"How Can I Go On" (with Montserrat Caballé)	Mercury; Moran	Mercury; Moran; Richards	3:51
9.	"Foolin' Around" (Steve Brown Remix)	Mercury	Mack; Mercury; Steve Brown^{[a]}	3:36
10.	"Time"	Clark; John Christie	Clark; Mercury	3:56
11.	"Barcelona" (with Montserrat Caballé)	Mercury; Moran	Mercury; Moran; Richards	5:40
12.	"Love Me Like There's No Tomorrow"	Mercury	Mack; Mercury	3:47
13.	"I Was Born to Love You"	Mercury	Mack; Mercury	3:40
14.	"The Golden Boy" (with Montserrat Caballé)	Mercury; Moran; Tim Rice	Mercury; Moran; Richards	6:06
15.	"Mr. Bad Guy"	Mercury	Mack; Mercury	4:12
16.	"The Great Pretender" (Malouf Remix)	Ram	Mercury; Moran; Richards; Julian Raymond^{[a]}	3:39
17.	"Love Kills" (Star Rider Remix) (New 2006 Remix)	Mercury; Moroder	Mercury; Moroder; Mack; Star Rider^{[a]}	3:39
18.	"I Can Hear Music" (Larry Lurex, 1973 Single)	Ellie Greenwich; Phil Spector; Jeff Barry	Robin Geoffrey Cable	3:28
19.	"Goin' Back" (Larry Lurex, 1973 B-side)	Gerry Goffin; Carole King	Cable	3:34
20.	"Guide Me Home" (Piano Version)	Mercury; Moran	Thierry Lang	4:18

Disc two
No.	Title	Writer(s)	Producer(s)	Length
1.	"Love Kills" (Sunshine People Radio Mix) (New 2006 Remix)	Mercury; Moroder	Mercury; Moroder; Mack; Piet Blank^{[a]}; Jaspa Jones^{[a]}; Andy Kaufhold^{[a]}	3:16
2.	"Made in Heaven" (Extended Version) (Taken from The Solo Collection)	Mercury	Mack; Mercury	4:50
3.	"Living on My Own" (The Egg Remix) (New 2006 Remix)	Mercury	Mack; Mercury; The Egg^{[a]}	5:37
4.	"Love Kills" (Rank 1 Remix) (New 2006 Remix)	Mercury; Moroder	Mercury; Moroder; Mack; Rank 1^{[a]}	7:18
5.	"Mr. Bad Guy" (Previously unavailable early version)	Mercury	Mack; Mercury	3:26
6.	"I Was Born to Love You" (George Demure Almost Vocal Mix) (New 2006 Remix)	Mercury	Mack; Mercury; George Demure^{[a]}	4:02
7.	"My Love Is Dangerous" (Extended Version) (Taken from The Solo Collection)	Mercury	Mack; Mercury	6:28
8.	"Love Makin' Love" (Demo) (Taken from The Solo Collection)	Mercury		3:38
9.	"Love Kills" (Pixel82 Remix) (New 2006 Remix)	Mercury; Moroder	Mercury; Moroder; Mack; Pixel82^{[a]}	6:13
10.	"I Was Born to Love You" (Extended Version) (Taken from The Solo Collection)	Mercury	Mack; Mercury	7:05
11.	"Foolin' Around" (Early Version) (Taken from The Solo Collection)	Mercury	Mack; Mercury	4:15
12.	"Living on My Own" (No More Brothers Extended Mix) (Taken from The Solo Collection)	Mercury	Mack; Mercury; No More Brothers^{[a]}	5:15
13.	"Love Kills" (More Oder Rework by the Glimmers) (New 2006 Remix)	Mercury; Moroder	Mercury; Moroder; Mack; The Glimmers^{[a]}	6:53
14.	"Your Kind of Lover" (Vocal & Piano Version) (Taken from The Solo Collection)	Mercury	Mack; Mercury	3:38
15.	"Let's Turn It On" (A Cappella) (Taken from The Solo Collection)	Mercury	Mack; Mercury	3:04

Notes

- ^{^[a]} signifies a remix producer

=== DVD ===
==== Disc one ====
1. "The Untold Story" documentary
2. "The Making of 'The Untold Story'"

==== Disc two ====
1. "Barcelona"
2. "The Great Pretender" (original 1987 single version)
3. "I Was Born to Love You"
4. "Time"
5. "How Can I Go On"
6. "Made in Heaven"
7. "Living on My Own"
8. "The Golden Boy"
9. "In My Defence" (re-edit 2000)
10. "Barcelona" (live version)
11. "The Great Pretender" (extended version)
12. "Living on My Own" ('93 remix)
13. A View Forever (Unveiling of the Freddie Statue)
14. "A Winters Tale"
15. "Who Wants to Live Forever"
16. "Love Me Like There's No Tomorrow"

== Charts ==
=== Album ===
Chart (2006)	Peak position
Austrian Albums Chart	7
Belgian (Flanders) Albums Chart	63
Belgian (Wallonia) Albums Chart	44
Czech Albums (ČNS IFPI) charted as Very Best of Freddie	31
Dutch Albums Chart	30
European Albums Chart	4
French Compilations Chart	14
German Albums Chart	13
Hungarian Albums Chart	9
Irish Albums Chart	26
Italian Albums Chart	1
Norwegian Albums Chart	8
Polish Albums Chart	24
Portuguese Albums Chart	11
Scottish Albums (Official Charts)	5
Spanish Albums Chart	6
Swedish Albums Chart	14
Swiss Albums Chart	16
UK Albums Chart	6

=== DVD ===
Chart (2006)	Peak position
Austrian Music DVDs Chart	1
Belgian (Flanders) Music DVDs Chart	5
Belgian (Wallonia) Music DVDs Chart	5
Danish Music DVDs Chart	3
Dutch Music DVDs Chart	5
Hungarian DVDs Chart	2
Italian Music DVDs Chart	1
Spanish Music DVDs Chart	2
Swedish Music DVDs Chart	1
UK Music Videos (Official Charts)	1

== Certifications and sales ==
Region	Certification	Certified units/sales
France (SNEP) DVD	Gold	10,000^{*}
Italy 2006 sales	—	150,000
Poland (ZPAV) DVD	Platinum	10,000^{*}
Spain (Promusicae) Album	Gold	40,000^{^}
Spain (Promusicae) DVD	Gold	10,000^{^}
United Kingdom (BPI) Album	Gold	100,000^{^}
United Kingdom (BPI) DVD	Gold	25,000^{^}
^{*} Sales figures based on certification alone.^{^} Shipments figures based on certification alone.
