= Messenger of the Gods: The Singles =

Greatest hits album by Freddie Mercury
- Released: 2 September 2016
- Recorded: 1973–1993
- Length: 97:05
- Label: Mercury, Universal, Hollywood
- Producer: Various

Freddie Mercury chronology
Lover of Life, Singer of Songs (2006)	Messenger of the Gods: The Singles (2016)	Never Boring (2019)

Messenger of the Gods: The Singles is a compilation album of Freddie Mercury's singles. It was released three days before what would have been Mercury's 70th birthday.

As well as a two-CD compilation album, the album has been released on a 13-vinyl box set reproducing singles on 7" vinyl and the same artwork. The earliest single issued is The Beach Boys song "I Can Hear Music" and the last single in chronological order is the No More Brothers remix of "Living on My Own".

== CD Track listing ==
=== Disc one: The Singles ===
No.	Title	Writer(s)	Length
1.	"Living on My Own" (Single Edit)	Freddie Mercury	3:05
2.	"The Great Pretender"	Buck Ram	3:25
3.	"In My Defence"	Dave Clark; Jeff Daniels; David Soames	3:54
4.	"Love Kills"	Mercury; Giorgio Moroder	4:28
5.	"Barcelona" (Single Version)	Mercury; Mike Moran	4:25
6.	"Made in Heaven" (Single Remix)	Mercury	4:08
7.	"Time"	John Christie; Clark	4:01
8.	"Love Me Like There's No Tomorrow"	Mercury	3:46
9.	"I Was Born to Love You"	Mercury	3:39
10.	"The Golden Boy" (Single Edit)	Mercury; Moran; Tim Rice	5:14
11.	"I Can Hear Music"	Jeff Barry; Ellie Greenwich; Phil Spector	3:24
12.	"How Can I Go On" (Single Version)	Mercury; Moran	4:02
13.	"Living on My Own" (No More Brothers Remix)	Mercury	3:40
Total length:			51:11

=== Disc two: The B-Sides ===
No.	Title	Writer(s)	Length
1.	"Goin' Back" (Single Edit)	Gerry Goffin; Carole King	3:32
2.	"Let's Turn It On"	Mercury	3:25
3.	"My Love Is Dangerous"	Mercury	3:39
4.	"She Blows Hot and Cold"	Mercury	3:39
5.	"Living on My Own" (Julian Raymond Album Mix)	Mercury	3:37
6.	"Stop All the Fighting"	Mercury	3:18
7.	"Time" (Instrumental)	Christie; Clark	3:22
8.	"Exercises in Free Love" (Freddie Vocal)	Mercury; Moran	3:59
9.	"Exercises in Free Love" (Montserrat Vocal)	Mercury; Moran	4:04
10.	"The Fallen Priest" (B-Side Edit)	Mercury; Moran; Rice	2:45
11.	"Overture Piccante"	Mercury; Moran	6:40
12.	"Love Kills" (Wolf Euro Mix)	Mercury; Moroder	3:27
Total length:			47:56

== Coloured 7" vinyl box set ==
Disc 1 (Blue)
Side A: "I Can Hear Music" (Larry Lurex)
Side B: "Goin' Back" (Larry Lurex)

Disc 2 (Orange)
Side A: "Love Kills"

Disc 3 (Yellow)
Side A: "I Was Born to Love You"
Side B: "Stop All The Fighting"

Disc 4 (Red)
Side A: "Made in Heaven (Single Remix)"
Side B: "She Blows Hot and Cold"
Released in 1985

Disc 5 (White)
Side A: "Living on My Own (Single Edit)"
Side B: "My Love Is Dangerous"

Disc 6 (Red)
Side A: "Love Me Like There's No Tomorrow"
Side B: "Let's Turn It On"

Disc 7 (Cyan)
Side A: "Time"
Side B: "Time (Instrumental)"

Disc 8 (Orange)
Side A: "The Great Pretender"
Side B: "Exercises in Free Love (Freddie's Vocal)"

Disc 9 (Clear)
Side A: "Barcelona (Single Version)"
Side B: "Exercises in Free Love (Montserrat's Vocal)"

Disc 10 (Gold)
Side A: "The Golden Boy (Single Edit)"
Side B: "The Fallen Priest"

Disc 11 (Green)
Side A: "How Can I Go On (Single Version)"
Side B: "Overture Piccante"

Disc 12 (Neon Pink)
Side A: "In My Defence"
Side B: "Love Kills (Wolf Euro Mix)"

Disc 13 (Yellow)
Side A: "Living on My Own (No More Brothers Remix)"
Side B: "Living on My Own (Julian Raymond Album Mix)"

== Charts ==
Chart (2016)	Peak position
Austrian Albums (Ö3 Austria)	24
Belgian Albums (Ultratop Flanders)	18
Belgian Albums (Ultratop Wallonia)	22
Czech Albums (ČNS IFPI)	14
Dutch Albums (Album Top 100)	27
French Albums (SNEP)	148
German Albums (Offizielle Top 100)	33
Italian Albums (FIMI)	53
New Zealand Heatseekers Albums (RMNZ)	8
Polish Albums (ZPAV)	16
Portuguese Albums (AFP)	26
Scottish Albums (OCC)	20
Spanish Albums (PROMUSICAE)	13
Swiss Albums (Schweizer Hitparade)	53
UK Albums (OCC)	31
