= Never Boring =

Box set by Freddie Mercury
- Released: 11 October 2019
- Recorded: 1983–2019
- Genre: Pop; opera
- Length: 48:35 (standard 12-track edition); 191:14 (deluxe box set edition)
- Label: Mercury; Hollywood
- Producer: Various

Freddie Mercury chronology
Messenger of the Gods: The Singles (2016)	Never Boring (2019)

Professional ratings
Review scores
Source	Rating
AllMusic	3.5/5 stars
Loudersound	3.5/5 stars

Never Boring is a box set compilation of solo work by English musician Freddie Mercury, released on 11 October 2019. The box set contains three CDs and a collection of promotional videos on both Blu-ray and DVD, as well as a 120-page hardbound book. All three discs were also issued individually on CD, vinyl, digital and streaming services. The title of the box set is a reference to a remark made by Mercury to his manager, about how he would like to be remembered: "You can do what you want with my music, but don't make me boring".

== Track listing ==
=== Never Boring (12-track compilation) ===
No.	Title	Writer(s)	Length
1.	"The Great Pretender" (2019 Special Edition)	Buck Ram	3:27
2.	"I Was Born to Love You" (2019 Special Edition)	Freddie Mercury	3:38
3.	"Barcelona" (2012 Orchestrated Version)	Mercury; Mike Moran	5:42
4.	"In My Defence" (2000 Remix)	Dave Clark; Jeff Daniels; David Soames	3:52
5.	"Love Kills" (2019 Special Edition)	Mercury; Giorgio Moroder	4:29
6.	"How Can I Go On" (2012 Orchestrated Single Version)	Mercury; Moran	3:58
7.	"Love Me Like There's No Tomorrow" (2019 Special Edition)	Mercury	3:45
8.	"Living on My Own" (1993 Radio Mix)	Mercury	3:37
9.	"The Golden Boy" (2012 Orchestrated Single Edit)	Mercury; Moran; Tim Rice	5:12
10.	"Time Waits for No One"	John Christie; Clark	3:19
11.	"She Blows Hot and Cold" (2019 Special Edition)	Mercury	3:25
12.	"Made in Heaven" (2019 Special Edition)	Mercury	4:11
Total length:			48:35

=== Mr. Bad Guy (2019 Special Edition) ===
No.	Title	Writer(s)	Length
1.	"Let's Turn It On"	Mercury	3:43
2.	"Made in Heaven"	Mercury	4:07
3.	"I Was Born to Love You"	Mercury	3:39
4.	"Foolin' Around"	Mercury	3:30
5.	"Your Kind of Lover"	Mercury	3:35
6.	"Mr. Bad Guy"	Mercury	4:10
7.	"Man Made Paradise"	Mercury	4:10
8.	"There Must Be More to Life Than This"	Mercury	3:02
9.	"Living on My Own"	Mercury	3:24
10.	"My Love Is Dangerous"	Mercury	3:44
11.	"Love Me Like There's No Tomorrow"	Mercury	3:47
Total length:			40:51

=== Barcelona (2012 orchestral edition) ===
No.	Title	Writer(s)	Length
1.	"Barcelona"	Mercury; Moran	5:43
2.	"La Japonaise"	Mercury; Moran	4:52
3.	"The Fallen Priest"	Mercury; Moran; Rice	5:47
4.	"Ensueño"	Montserrat Caballé; Mercury; Moran	4:23
5.	"The Golden Boy"	Mercury; Moran; Rice	6:04
6.	"Guide Me Home"	Mercury; Moran	2:50
7.	"How Can I Go On"	Mercury; Moran	3:50
8.	"Exercises in Free Love"	Mercury; Moran	3:57
9.	"Overture Piccante"	Mercury; Moran	6:45
Total length:			44:13

=== Never Boring (Blu-ray / DVD) ===
No.	Title	Length
1.	"Made in Heaven"	4:14
2.	"The Great Pretender"	3:26
3.	"Living on My Own"	3:10
4.	"Barcelona"	4:30
5.	"I Was Born to Love You"	3:39
6.	"Time Waits for No One"	3:31
7.	"In My Defence"	3:53
8.	"Living on My Own" (Radio Mix)	3:41
9.	"The Golden Boy" (La Nit performance, Barcelona)	6:03
10.	"How Can I Go On" (La Nit performance, Barcelona)	3:48
11.	"Barcelona" (La Nit performance, Barcelona)	5:50
Total length:		45:46

Bonus videos
No.	Title	Length
12.	"Freddie Mercury & Dave Clark “Time” Interview"	3:37
13.	"The Great Pretender" (Extended Version)	5:54
14.	"Barcelona" (Ku Klub performance, Ibiza)	5:18
Total length:		14:49

== Charts ==
Chart performance for Never Boring
Chart (2019)	Peak position
Austrian Albums (Ö3 Austria)	21
Belgian Albums (Ultratop Flanders)	62
Belgian Albums (Ultratop Wallonia)	37
Czech Albums (ČNS IFPI)	75
Dutch Albums (Album Top 100)	54
French Albums (SNEP)	164
German Albums (Offizielle Top 100)	23
Italian Albums (FIMI)	50
Japanese Albums (Oricon)	29
Polish Albums (ZPAV)	32
Scottish Albums (Official Charts)	6
Spanish Albums (Promusicae)	10
Swiss Albums (Schweizer Hitparade)	9
UK Albums (Official Charts)	18
