= The Solo Collection =

2000 compilation box set by Freddie Mercury

Box set by Freddie Mercury
- Released: 23 October 2000
- Recorded: 1969–1989, 1993, 2000
- Genre: Pop rock
- Label: Parlophone

Freddie Mercury chronology
The Freddie Mercury Album /The Great Pretender (1992)	The Solo Collection (2000)	Lover of Life, Singer of Songs (2006)

The Solo Collection is a compilation box set detailing the solo career of Freddie Mercury. It includes the material Mercury recorded before joining Queen, through to the 1993 No More Brothers remixes. Mercury's two studio albums are included, along with various single edits and non-album singles, B-sides, remixes, instrumentals, collaborations, a large number of demo recordings and a set of interviews conducted by David Wigg. Also included are two DVDs: a collection of Mercury's promotional music videos, and a documentary covering his life.

== Track listing ==
=== The Solo Collection (twelve-disc edition) ===
==== Disc one: Mr. Bad Guy (1985) ====
All songs written by Freddie Mercury

1. "Let's Turn It On" – 3:42
2. "Made in Heaven" – 4:05
3. "I Was Born to Love You" – 3:38
4. "Foolin' Around" – 3:29
5. "Your Kind of Lover" – 3:32
6. "Mr. Bad Guy" – 4:09
7. "Man Made Paradise" – 4:08
8. "There Must Be More to Life Than This" – 3:00
9. "Living on My Own" – 3:23
10. "My Love Is Dangerous" – 3:42
11. "Love Me Like There's No Tomorrow" – 3:46

==== Disc two: Barcelona (1988) ====
1. Barcelona (Mercury) – 5:39
2. La Japonaise (Mercury) – 4:48
3. The Fallen Priest (Mercury/Moran/Rice) – 5:45
4. Ensueño (Mercury/Moran/Caballé) – 4:21
5. The Golden Boy (Mercury/Moran/Rice) – 6:03
6. Guide Me Home (Mercury/Moran) – 2:49
7. How Can I Go On (Mercury) – 3:50
8. Overture Piccante (Mercury/Moran) – 6:39

==== Disc three: The Great Pretender (1992) ====
1. The Great Pretender (Brian Malouf Mix) (Ram) – 3:39
2. Foolin' Around (Steve Brown Mix) (Mercury) – 3:35
3. Time (Nile Rodgers Mix) (Dave Clark/John Christie) – 3:49
4. Your Kind Of Lover (Steve Brown Mix) (Mercury) – 3:59
5. Exercises In Free Love (Mercury/Moran) – 3:56
6. In My Defence (Ron Nevison Mix) (Clark/Soames/Daniels) – 3:51
7. Mr. Bad Guy (Brian Malouf Mix) (Mercury) – 4:00
8. Let's Turn It On (Jeff Lord-Alge Mix) (Mercury) – 3:45
9. Living on My Own (Julian Raymond Mix) (Mercury) – 3:38
10. My Love Is Dangerous (Jeff Lord-Alge Mix) (Mercury) – 3:40
11. Love Kills (Richard Wolf Mix) (Mercury/Moroder) – 3:28

==== Disc four: The Singles 1973–1985 ====
1. I Can Hear Music (Larry Lurex, 1973 Single) (Greenwich/Spector/Barry) – 3:29
2. Goin' Back (Larry Lurex, 1973 B-side) (Goffin/King) – 3:34
3. Love Kills (Original 1984 Single Version) (Mercury/Moroder) – 4:31
4. Love Kills (Original 1984 Extended Version) (Mercury/Moroder) – 5:22
5. I Was Born to Love You (Original 1985 Extended Version) (Mercury) – 7:05
6. Stop All The Fighting (1985 Non-album B-side) (Mercury) – 3:19
7. Stop All The Fighting (1985 Non-album B-side Extended Version) (Mercury) – 6:37
8. Made in Heaven (Original 1985 Extended Version) (Mercury) – 4:50
9. She Blows Hot & Cold (1985 Non-album B-side) (Mercury) – 3:26
10. She Blows Hot & Cold (1985 Non-album B-side Extended Version) (Mercury) – 5:50
11. Living On My Own (1985 Extended Version) (Mercury) - 6:40
12. My Love Is Dangerous (Original 1985 Extended Version) (Mercury) – 6:29
13. Love Me Like There's No Tomorrow (Original 1985 Extended Version) (Mercury) – 5:32
14. Let's Turn It On (Original 1985 Extended Version) (Mercury) – 5:08

==== Disc five: The Singles 1986–1993 ====
1. Time (Original 1986 Single/Album Version) (Clark/Christie) – 3:58
2. Time (Original 1986 Extended Version) (Clark/Christie) – 4:37
3. Time (Original 1986 Instrumental Version) (Clark/Christie) – 3:22
4. In My Defence (1986 Album Version) (Clark/Soames/Daniels) – 3:57
5. The Great Pretender (Original 1987 Single Version) (Ram) – 3:29
6. The Great Pretender (Original 1987 Extended Version) (Ram) – 5:54
7. Exercises In Free Love (1987 Non-album B-side) (Mercury/Moran) – 3:59
8. Barcelona (Original 1987 Single Version) (Mercury/Moran) – 4:27
9. Barcelona (Original 1987 Extended Version) (Mercury/Moran) – 7:07
10. How Can I Go On (1989 Single Version) (Mercury/Moran) – 4:02
11. Living on My Own (1993 No More Brothers Extended Mix) (Mercury) – 5:16
12. Living on My Own (1993 Radio Mix) (Mercury) – 3:38
13. Living on My Own (1993 Club Mix) (Mercury) – 4:27
14. Living on My Own (1993 Underground Solutions Mix) (Mercury) – 5:45

==== Disc six: The Instrumentals ====
1. Barcelona (Instrumental) (Mercury/Moran) – 4:26
2. La Japonaise (Instrumental) (Mercury/Moran) – 4:46
3. The Fallen Priest (Instrumental) (Mercury/Moran/Rice) – 5:50
4. Ensueño (Instrumental) (Mercury/Moran/Caballé) – 4:00
5. The Golden Boy (Instrumental) (Mercury/Moran/Rice) – 6:05
6. Guide Me Home (Instrumental) (Mercury/Moran) – 2:38
7. How Can I Go On (Instrumental) (Mercury/Moran) – 3:58
8. Love Me Like There's No Tomorrow (Instrumental) (Mercury) – 4:03
9. Made in Heaven (Instrumental) (Mercury) – 4:17
10. Mr. Bad Guy (Instrumental) (Mercury) – 4:14
11. There Must Be More To Life Than This (Instrumental) (Mercury) – 3:08
12. In My Defence (Instrumental) (Clark/Soames/Daniels) – 3:56
13. The Great Pretender (Instrumental) (Ram) – 3:26

==== Disc seven: Rarities 1: The Mr Bad Guy Sessions ====
1. Let's Turn It On (A Capella) (Mercury) – 3:04
2. Made in Heaven (Alternative Version) (Mercury) – 4:27
3. I Was Born to Love You (Vocal & Piano Version) (Mercury) – 2:58
4. Foolin' Around (Early Version) (Mercury) – 4:14
5. Foolin' Around (Original 1985 Unreleased 12" Mix) (Mercury) – 5:37
6. Foolin' Around (Instrumental) (Mercury) – 3:40
7. Your Kind Of Lover (Early Version) (Mercury) – 4:47
8. Your Kind Of Lover (Vocal & Piano Version) (Mercury) – 3:38
9. Mr. Bad Guy (Orchestra Out-takes) (Mercury) – 0:35
10. Mr. Bad Guy (Early Version) (Mercury) – 3:29
11. There Must Be More To Life Than This (Piano Out-takes) (Mercury) – 2:48
12. Living on My Own (Hybrid Edit: Early/Later Versions) (Mercury) – 4:29
13. Love Is Dangerous (Early Version) (Mercury) – 2:12
14. Love Me Like There's No Tomorrow (Early Version) (Mercury) – 2:18
15. Love Me Like There's No Tomorrow (2nd Early Version: Extract) (Mercury) – 1:03
16. Love Me Like There's No Tomorrow (3rd Early Version) (Mercury) – 3:26
17. Love Me Like There's No Tomorrow (Live Take) (Mercury) – 4:22
18. She Blows Hot & Cold (Alternative Version featuring Brian May) (Mercury) – 4:36
19. Gazelle (Demo) (Mercury) – 1:20
20. Money Can't Buy Happiness (Demo) (Mercury) – 2:37
21. Love Makin' Love (Demo) (Mercury) – 3:35
22. God Is Heavy (Demo) (Mercury) – 1:22
23. New York (Demo) (Mercury) – 2:12

==== Disc eight: Rarities 2: The Barcelona Sessions ====
1. The Duet (The Fallen Priest) (Extract from Garden Lodge tape) (Mercury/Moran/Rice) – 3:04
2. Idea (Barcelona) (Extract from Garden Lodge tape) (Mercury/Moran) – 1:12
3. Idea (Barcelona) (2nd Extract from Garden Lodge tape) (Mercury/Moran) – 1:04
4. Barcelona (Early Version: Freddie's Demo Vocal) (Mercury/Moran) – 4:21
5. Barcelona (Freddie's Vocal Slave) (Mercury/Moran) – 4:31
6. Barcelona (Later Version: Freddie's Vocal only) (Mercury/Moran) – 4:26
7. La Japonaise (Early Version: Freddie's Vocal only) (Mercury/Moran) – 4:41
8. La Japonaise (A Capella) (Mercury/Moran) – 4:17
9. Rachmaninov's Revenge (The Fallen Priest) (Early Version) (Mercury/Moran/Rice) – 4:46
10. Rachmaninov's Revenge (The Fallen Priest) (Later Version: Freddie's Demo Vocal) – 5:51
11. Ensueño (Montserrat's Live Takes) (Mercury/Moran/Caballé) – 5:36
12. The Golden Boy (Early Version: Freddie's Demo Vocal) (Mercury/Moran/Rice) – 3:54
13. The Golden Boy (2nd Early Version: Extract) (Mercury/Moran/Rice) – 2:56
14. The Golden Boy (A Capella featuring Gospel Choir) (Mercury/Moran/Rice) – 5:12
15. Guide Me Home / How Can I Go On (Alternative Versions) (Mercury/Moran) – 6:54
16. How Can I Go On (Out-take: Extract) (Mercury/Moran) – 1:31
17. How Can I Go On (Alternative Piano Version) (Mercury/Moran) – 3:45
18. "When This Old Tired Body Wants to Sing" (Late Night Jam) (Mercury/Moran) – 2:42

==== Disc nine: Rarities 3: Other Sessions ====
1. Rain (Ibex, Live 1969) (Lennon–McCartney) – 3:51
2. Green (Wreckage, Rehearsal 1969) (Mercury) – 3:15
3. The Man From Manhattan (Eddie Howell 1976) (Howell) – 3:22
4. Love Is The Hero (Billy Squier: 12" Version 1986) (Squier) – 5:22
5. Lady With A Tenor Sax (Billy Squier: Work In Progress 1986) (Squier/Mercury) – 4:02
6. Hold On (Freddie Mercury and Jo Dare 1986) (Mercury/Mack) – 3:38
7. Heaven for Everyone (The Cross Version: Freddie Vocal 1988) (Taylor) – 4:48
8. Love Kills (Rock Mix) (Mercury/Moroder) – 4:27
9. Love Kills (Instrumental) (Mercury/Moroder/Keenan) – 4:26
10. The Great Pretender (Original Demo) (Ram) – 3:04
11. Holding On (Demo) (Mercury) – 4:12
12. It's So You (Demo) (Mercury) – 2:40
13. I Can't Dance / Keep Smilin' (Demo) (Mercury) – 3:43
14. Horns Of Doom (Demo) (Richards) – 4:16
15. Yellow Breezes (Demo) (Mercury/Moran) – 5:25
16. Have A Nice Day (Fan Club Message) (Mercury/Moran) – 0:45

==== Disc ten: The David Wigg Interviews ====
1. 1979, London (The Crazy tour) – 8:11
2. 1984, Munich (The Works tour) – 11:27
3. 1984, Munich (Pt. 2 Going solo) – 7:37
4. 1985, Wembley, London (Week of Live Aid) – 6:45
5. 1986, London (The Magic tour) – 10:35
6. 1987, Ibiza (Freddie's 41st birthday) – 9:56
7. 1987, Ibiza (41st birthday. Pt. 2 Montserrat Caballé) – 8:21
8. 1987, Ibiza (41st birthday. Pt. 3 The Great Pretender) – 10:26

==== Disc eleven: The Video Collection (DVD) ====
- Barcelona (Live Version) (Mercury/Moran)
- The Great Pretender (Single Version) (Ram)
- I Was Born to Love You (Mercury)
- Time (Clark/Christie)
- How Can I Go On (Mercury/Moran)
- Made in Heaven (Mercury)
- Living on My Own (Mercury)
- The Golden Boy (Mercury/Moran/Rice)
- The Great Pretender (Extended Version) (Ram)
- Barcelona (Mercury/Moran)
- In My Defence (Re-edit 2000) (Clark/Soames/Daniels)
- Guide Me Home (Mercury/Moran)

==== Disc twelve: The Untold Story (DVD) ====
- Spice Island Dawn
- Strange Discipline
- Culture Shock
- The Draftsman Of Ealing
- Musical Awakenings
- Love of My Life
- Bacchus And Aphrodite
- Butterflies And Peacocks
- A Day At The Opera
- My Kind Of Towns
- Last Days

In early prints of the Solo Collection box, the third chapter of the DVD, "Culture Shock", includes what is described in the audio commentary by the filmmakers, Rudi Dolezal and Hannes Rossacher of DoRo Productions, as a reconstruction of a Parsi initiation religious ceremony. This segment was completely edited out from all subsequent reprints of the DVD as it was considered potentially offensive. It is also absent from the second version of the documentary, released in 2006 as Disc 1 of Lover of Life, Singer of Songs, the DVD release accompanying the same-titled compilation CD of Mercury solo recordings.

=== Solo ===
Solo

Box set by Freddie Mercury
- Released: 7 November 2000
- Recorded: 1969–1989, 1993, 2000
- Genre: Pop rock
- Labels: Parlophone, Hollywood (US/Canada)

The box set was also released as a three-disc sampler titled Solo. This edition contains Mercury's two original studio albums, as well as a third disc of selected tracks from the twelve-disc box set.

Disc one
Mr. Bad Guy
Disc two
Barcelona

Disc three (Bonus CD)

1. I Can Hear Music (Larry Lurex, 1973 Single) – 3:29
2. Love Kills (Original 1984 Single Version) – 4:31
3. The Great Pretender (Original 1987 Single Version) – 3:29
4. Living on My Own (1993 Radio Mix) – 3:38
5. In My Defence (2000 Remix) – 3:55
6. Time (2000 Remix) – 4:02
7. Love Kills (Rock Mix) – 4:27

==== Weekly charts ====
Chart (2000)	Peak position
Austrian Albums (Ö3 Austria)	36
Dutch Albums (Album Top 100)	21
German Albums (Offizielle Top 100)	55
Italian Albums (FIMI)	45
Scottish Albums (Official Charts)	20
Swiss Albums (Schweizer Hitparade)	42
UK Albums (Official Charts)	13

==== Year-end charts ====
Chart (2000)	Position
UK Albums (OCC)	77
