= The Freddie Mercury Album =

Compilation album by Freddie Mercury
- Released: 16 November 1992
- Recorded: 1983–1988
- Genres: Rock; pop
- Length: 44:16 (UK); 41:13 (US)
- Labels: Parlophone; Hollywood
- Producer: Various

Freddie Mercury chronology
Barcelona (1988)	The Freddie Mercury Album (1992)	The Solo Collection (2000)

The Great Pretender (U.S.)

Professional ratings
Review scores
Source	Rating
AllMusic (TFMA)	link
AllMusic (TGP)	link
MusicHound Rock	2.5/5 stars
NME	4/10
Select	2/5 medals

The Freddie Mercury Album is a posthumous solo project with material from Queen frontman and vocalist Freddie Mercury released in 1992, to observe the anniversary of his death. The album is mainly made up of new remixes, as well as the original versions of "Barcelona", "Love Kills", "Exercises in Free Love", and "The Great Pretender". A week later, The Great Pretender, its US counterpart, was released.

There were numerous producers who had permission from Jim Beach to use the original master tapes. Reinhold Mack, who is not credited as being involved, was hired to oversee the project. The album was released by Hollywood Records on 24 November 1992. The US album differs from its UK counterpart (aside from a different running order) by replacing the original versions of "The Great Pretender" and "Love Kills" with remixes, featuring a slightly altered ending of the "Mr. Bad Guy" remix, and replacing "Barcelona" with a remix of "My Love Is Dangerous".

== Track listing ==
All tracks are written by Freddie Mercury, except where noted.

The Freddie Mercury Album
No.	Title	Writer(s)	Original release	Length
1.	"The Great Pretender"	Buck Ram	Non-album single, 1987	3:25
2.	"Foolin' Around" (Steve Brown Mix)		Mr. Bad Guy, 1985	3:36
3.	"Time" (Nile Rodgers Mix)	Clark; John Christie	Time, 1986	3:50
4.	"Your Kind of Lover" (Steve Brown Mix)		Mr. Bad Guy	3:59
5.	"Exercises in Free Love"	Mercury; Moran	B-side of "Barcelona" single, 1987	3:58
6.	"In My Defence" (Ron Nevison Mix)	Clark; David Soames; Jeff Daniels	Time	3:52
7.	"Mr. Bad Guy" (Brian Malouf Mix)		Mr. Bad Guy	3:56
8.	"Let's Turn It On" (Jeff Lord-Alge Mix)		Mr. Bad Guy	3:46
9.	"Living on My Own" (Julian Raymond Mix)		Mr. Bad Guy	3:36
10.	"Love Kills"	Mercury; Moroder	Metropolis OST, 1984	4:29
11.	"Barcelona" (duet with Montserrat Caballé)	Mercury; Moran	Barcelona, 1987	5:37
Total length:				44:16

The Great Pretender
No.	Title	Writer(s)	Original release	Length
1.	"The Great Pretender" (Brian Malouf Mix)	Ram	Non-album single	3:39
2.	"Foolin' Around" (Steve Brown Mix)		Mr. Bad Guy	3:36
3.	"Time" (Nile Rodgers Mix)	Clark; Christie	Time	3:50
4.	"Your Kind of Lover" (Steve Brown Mix)		Mr. Bad Guy	3:59
5.	"Exercises in Free Love"	Mercury; Moran	B-side of "Barcelona" single	3:58
6.	"In My Defence" (Ron Nevison Mix)	Clark; Soames; Daniels	Time	3:52
7.	"Mr. Bad Guy" (Brian Malouf Mix)		Mr. Bad Guy	3:56
8.	"Let's Turn It On" (Jeff Lord-Alge Mix)		Mr. Bad Guy	3:46
9.	"Living on My Own" (Julian Raymond Mix (Note: Some pressings feature the No More Brothers Radio Mix instead))		Mr. Bad Guy	3:36
10.	"My Love Is Dangerous" (Jeff Lord-Alge Mix)		Mr. Bad Guy	3:43
11.	"Love Kills" (Richard Wolf Mix)	Mercury; Moroder	Metropolis OST	3:25
12.	"Living on My Own" (Techno Mix)		Mr. Bad Guy	3:47
Total length:				41:13

== Charts ==
=== Weekly charts ===
Weekly chart performance for The Freddie Mercury Album
Chart (1992–1993)	Peak position
Australian Albums (ARIA)	114
Austrian Albums (Ö3 Austria)	2
Dutch Albums (Album Top 100)	9
French Albums (SNEP)	6
French Compilations (SNEP)	5
German Albums (Offizielle Top 100)	3
Hungarian Albums (MAHASZ)	10
New Zealand Albums (RMNZ)	4
Norwegian Albums (VG-lista)	12
Swedish Albums (Sverigetopplistan)	35
Swiss Albums (Schweizer Hitparade)	8
UK Albums (Official Charts)	4

=== Year-end charts ===
1993 year-end performance for The Freddie Mercury
Chart (1993)	Position
Austrian Albums (Ö3 Austria)	38
Dutch Albums (Album Top 100)	43
German Albums (Offizielle Top 100)	81
UK Albums (OCC)	78

== Certifications ==
Certifications and sales for The Freddie Mercury Album
Region	Certification	Certified units/sales
Argentina (CAPIF)	Platinum	60,000^{^}
Austria (IFPI Austria)	Platinum	50,000^{*}
Finland (Musiikkituottajat)	Gold	26,638
France (SNEP)	2× Platinum	600,000^{*}
Germany (BVMI)	Platinum	500,000^{^}
Netherlands (NVPI)	Gold	50,000^{^}
New Zealand (RMNZ)	Platinum	15,000^{^}
Spain (Promusicae)	2× Platinum	200,000^{^}
Sweden (GLF)	Gold	50,000^{^}
Switzerland (IFPI Switzerland)	Platinum	50,000^{^}
United Kingdom (BPI)	2× Platinum	600,000^{^}
^{*} Sales figures based on certification alone.^{^} Shipments figures based on certification alone.
