= Born to Rock 'n' Roll =

- Picture sleeve

Single by Cliff Richard

from the album Dave Clark's Time The Album
- B-side: "Law of the Universe"
- Released: 6 May 1986
- Recorded: 25 August 1985
- Studio: Marcus Studios, London
- Genre: Pop rock
- Length: 3:57
- Label: EMI
- Songwriter(s): Dave Clark, Jeff Daniels, David Soames
- Producer(s): Peter Collins

Cliff Richard singles chronology
"Living Doll" (1986)	"Born to Rock 'n' Roll" (1986)	"All I Ask of You" (1986)

"Born to Rock 'n' Roll" is a song recorded by English singer Cliff Richard and released in the UK in May 1986 as his third single from the musical soundtrack Time (Dave Clark album). The song reached number 28 in the Irish Singles Chart, but only minor positions outside the top 40 in the UK and Australia.

== Track listing ==
UK 7" Single (EMI 5545)

1. "Born to Rock 'n' Roll"
2. "Law of the Universe"

UK 12" Single (12 EMI 5545)

1. "Born to Rock 'n' Roll" (Special Extended Mix)
2. "Born to Rock 'n' Roll"
3. "Law of the Universe"

== Personnel ==
From the inner sleeve of Dave Clark's 'Time' The Album:

- Cliff Richard – lead vocal
- Dave Stewart – keyboards
- Billy Squire – guitars
- Graham Jarvis – drums
- Jerry Hay – bass guitar
- Billy Squire – backing vocals

== Chart performance ==
Chart (1986)	Peak position
Australia (Kent Music Report)	88
Ireland (IRMA)	28
UK Singles (OCC)	78
