= Time (musical) =

- Show logo
- Music: Jeff Daniels
- Lyrics: Dave Clark and David Soames
- Book: Dave Clark and David Soames
- Productions: 1986 West End

Time is a musical with a book and lyrics by Dave Clark and David Soames, music by Jeff Daniels, and additional songs by Hans Poulsen and David Pomeranz.

== Plot ==
Derived from the 1970s musical The Time Lord by Soames and Daniels, it focuses on contemporary rock musician Chris Wilder, who has been transported with his backup singers and band from a concert to the High Court of the Universe in the Andromeda Galaxy. In light of mankind's strides in space exploration, the Time Lord Melchisedic (loosely based on the title character in the BBC science fiction series Doctor Who) has decided the time has come to examine Earth's people to determine what role they will play in the quest for universal peace, and Wilder and his band are called upon to defend their planet.

== Productions ==
The heavily amplified multi-media event relied heavily on special effects, including a huge projected floating head named Akash (billed by the show's producers as a hologram) that served as a narrator throughout the show. The interior of the Dominion Theatre in London, where the show first ran, was gutted and reconstructed to accommodate the massive steel set with hydraulic lift designed by John Napier.

The West End production, directed and choreographed by Larry Fuller (assisted by Arlene Phillips), had a world premiere on April 9, 1986, at the Dominion Theatre in London, where it ran for two years. Cliff Richard starred as Wilder, Jodie Brooke Wilson as Louise, Jeff Shankley as Melchisedic, and Dilys Watling as one of the tribunal judges, with a pre-filmed Laurence Olivier as Akash. David Cassidy replaced Richard later in the run, closing with Grease producer David Ian. Stephanie Lawrence was also a replacement in the Time musical and played opposite Cassidy.

== Cast ==
- The Rock Star, Chris Wilder – Cliff Richard (Later replaced by David Cassidy)
- Louise – Jodie Brooke Wilson (Later replaced by Stephanie Lawrence)
- Babs – Dawn Hope
- Carol Ann – Maria Ventura
- The Rock Group – Cavin Cornwall, Neil Gow-Hunter, Simon Shelton, Ian Stewart
- Akash, The Ultimate Word in Truth – Laurence Olivier
- Judge Morgua – Dilys Watling
- Judge Trigon – John North
- Judge Lagus – David Timson
- Lord Melchisedic, The Time Lord – Jeff Shankley
- Lord Melchisedic's Retinue – Gary Co-Burn, Brad Graham (left due to injury) Neil Gow-Hunter, Kazimir Kolesnik, Alan Meggs, Dave Trevors, Steve Mondey, Simon Shelton, Simon Marlow, Neil Reynolds
- Captain Ebony – Clinton Derricks-Carroll
- Captain Ebony's Retinue – Heather Robbins, Linda Mae Brewer, Rosemary Ford, Robin Clever, Ian Stewart and Sparky (Later replaced by Kim Rosato, Stacey Haynes, Sandra Easby, Annabel Haydn, Ian Stewart, Cavin Cornwall)

== Recording ==
Time

Cast recording by various artists
- Released: 1986
- Label: EMI (UK); Capitol (US)
- Producer: Dave Clark

Singles from Time
- 1. "She's so Beautiful" Released: September 1985 (UK); 2. "Because" Released: November 1985 (UK); 3. "It's in Every One of Us" Released: November 1985 (UK); 4. "Time" Released: May 6, 1986 (UK); 5. "Time Will Teach Us All" Released: May 6, 1986 (UK) June 30, 1986 (US); 6. "Born to Rock 'n' Roll" Released: May 1986 (UK)

The concept album Time was released by Capitol Records in the United States and EMI elsewhere in the world (UK Catalogue Number UK:AMPM 1 (EQ 5003).

In addition to Richard and Olivier, it featured Freddie Mercury, Julian Lennon, Murray Head, Dionne Warwick, Leo Sayer, Ashford & Simpson, Stevie Wonder, John Christie, Jimmy Helms, Mike Moran, and Paul Miles-Kingston. Olivier's spoken "Theme From 'Time'" was released as a single in some countries and was a surprise hit on the Australian charts, reaching #27.

=== 25th anniversary release ===
The album was never released on CD but in 2012 Time – The Musical was made available for digital download from iTunes. It featured both acts of the show, the 13 single releases, new edits and several alternate mixes not on the original vinyl record or cassette release. The recordings were restored and remastered by Adam Vanryne and produced by Dave Clark. The re-release was timed to commemorate the musical's 25th anniversary. A 20-page color booklet accompanied the album.

== Song list ==
Act I

- Born to Rock 'n Roll
- Time Talkin'
- Time
- Music of the Spheres
- Law of the Universe
- The Time Lord Theme
- The Charge
- One Human Family
- What On Earth (moved to here from second song of act II at cast change in 1987)
- I Know, I Know
- Your Brother in Soul
- Case for the Prosecution
- Starmaker
- Time Will Teach Us All
- I Object
- In My Defence

Act II

- Within My World (added to opening of act II at cast change in 1987)
- Because I Love You
- Move the Judge
- What on Earth (removed from act II in 1987)
- She's So Beautiful
- If You Only Knew
- We're the UFO
- The Theme from Time
- Harmony
- The Return
- Time (Reprise)
- It's in Everyone of Us

== Critical reception ==
"If present trends go on, John Napier and his team will doubtless one day find themselves re-creating the entire state of Iowa for a rock musical about the Little Red Hen, or reconstructing the Alps for one about Heidi; but until then Time can claim it has provided the most sensational contrast between mountainous spectacle and molehill content the musical theatergoer has seen."

"It's like a science-fiction Sunday-school lesson. London critics had a field day sneering at its greeting-card philosophy and 1960s flower-power platitudes. But children, the young at heart, tourists with little English and any lover of sheer spectacle will be enraptured."

"But its actual genius is the man who invented its gravity-defying, sense-bombarding scenic effects, the modern theater's most astounding designer. His name is John Napier."

"The worst of it, though, are the philosophical speeches from The Time Lord who sounds like Captain Highliner (commercial spokesman of High Liner Foods) after transcendental meditation. If vinyl ever deserved to be melted..."
