= Love Kills (Freddie Mercury song) =

1984 single by Freddie Mercury

Single by Freddie Mercury

from the album Metropolis: Original Motion Picture Soundtrack
- B-side: "Rotwang's Party (Robot Dance)"
- Released: 10 September 1984
- Recorded: 1984
- Genre: Synth-pop
- Length: 4:29
- Label: CBS
- Songwriters: Freddie Mercury; Giorgio Moroder
- Producers: Freddie Mercury; Giorgio Moroder; Reinhold Mack

Freddie Mercury singles chronology
"Love Kills" (1984)	"I Was Born to Love You" (1985)

"Love Kills" is a 1984 song by Freddie Mercury, and his first song released as a solo artist, though the other members of Queen appeared on the song – initially uncredited.

Written by Mercury and Giorgio Moroder, it was originally used in Moroder's 1984 restoration and edit of Fritz Lang's 1927 silent film Metropolis, as part of the film's new soundtrack. In 1985, the film was nominated at the 5th Golden Raspberry Awards for Worst Musical Score, and the song itself was nominated for Worst Original Song. Nevertheless, the single reached number ten on the UK Singles Chart.

Officially, the single has only ever been credited to Freddie Mercury, despite it being a collaboration with Moroder. In 2000, the liner notes of the Freddie Mercury boxset The Solo Collection confirmed that Brian May and Roger Taylor contributed guitar and drums to the track, and many years later, the 2019 compilation Never Boring confirmed that the fourth member of Queen, John Deacon also performed on the song, contributing additional guitar parts. There has been no confirmation as to why the track was released credited solely to Mercury and not as a Queen single, but the band's contract with EMI Records worldwide (and Capitol Records in the USA) may have contributed to this, as the Metropolis soundtrack was released on CBS Records, who would go on to sign Freddie as a solo artist for the 1985 album Mr. Bad Guy.

The song was never performed live in any concert or event. Queen + Adam Lambert performed the song live for the first time on the North American leg of their tour in 2014 as a ballad. That version was later reworked by Brian May & Roger Taylor with the original vocals by Mercury for the album Queen Forever in 2014.

A remix of "Love Kills" was also used for the closing credits of the 1993 film Loaded Weapon 1. This version was the Richard Wolf Mix as found on the compilation album The Great Pretender.

The B-side, "Rotwang's Party (Robot Dance)" was written and performed by Moroder. Although used in his rendition of Metropolis, it was not included in the film's soundtrack album.

== Track listings ==
7" single
No.	Title	Writer(s)	Length
1.	"Love Kills"	Freddie Mercury; Giorgio Moroder	4:29
2.	"Rotwang's Party (Robot Dance)"	Moroder	3:10

12" single
No.	Title	Writer(s)	Length
1.	"Love Kills" (extended remix)	Mercury; Moroder	5:21
2.	"Rotwang's Party (Robot Dance)" (extended remix)	Moroder	5:21

== Personnel ==
- Freddie Mercury – vocals, synthesizers
- Reinhold Mack – synthesizers, programming
- Giorgio Moroder – synthesizers, programming
- Brian May – lead guitar
- John Deacon – additional guitar
- Roger Taylor – percussion

== Queen version ==
"Love Kills – the Ballad"

Single by Queen

from the album Queen Forever
- Released: 26 September 2014
- Recorded: 1984–2014
- Genre: Power ballad
- Length: 4:17
- Label: Virgin EMI
- Songwriters: Freddie Mercury; Giorgio Moroder
- Producers: Queen; William Orbit; Chris Thomas

Queen singles chronology
"Keep Yourself Alive (Long-Lost Retake)" (2011)	"Love Kills – the Ballad" (2014)	"Let Me in Your Heart Again" (2014)

A previously unreleased ballad version of the song was reworked by Brian May and Roger Taylor for the compilation Queen Forever. The Queen version is a stripped-down ballad version, while Mercury's version is a high energy track. "Love Kills" was considered for inclusion on the occasion of Queen's eleventh studio album The Works, but was not used.

=== Personnel ===
- Freddie Mercury – lead vocals, keyboard
- Giorgio Moroder – keyboard
- Brian May – guitars, keyboards, bass guitar
- Roger Taylor – drums
- John Deacon – additional guitars

== Remixes ==
- "Love Kills (Wolf remix)" was found in a promotional CD issued only in the United States in 1992.
- "Love Kills (Pixel '82 remix)" and "Love Kills (More Oder Rework by The Glimmers)" can both be found in the UK double-CD release of the 2006 compilation album Lover of Life, Singer of Songs: The Very Best of Freddie Mercury Solo
- Several remixes of the track are found in the 2006 Love Kills (remix) singles released in various European countries, with different track lists:
  - "Love Kills (Sunshine People Radio remix)"
  - "Love Kills (Star Rider remix)"
  - "Love Kills (Rank 1 Radio remix)"
  - "Love Kills (Sunshine People Club remix)"

== Charts ==
Chart (1984)	Peak position
Australia (Kent Music Report)	56
Austria (Ö3 Austria Top 40)	9
Belgium (Ultratop 50 Flanders)	17
Germany (GfK)	25
Ireland (IRMA)	4
Netherlands (Dutch Top 40)	32
Netherlands (Single Top 100)	24
Spain (Promusicae)	4
Switzerland (Schweizer Hitparade)	27
UK Singles (Official Charts)	10
US Billboard Hot 100	69
US Dance Club Songs (Billboard) Released with "Rotwang's Party (Robot Dance)"	44

Sunshine People Remix 2006 version

Chart (2006–07)	Peak position
Germany (GfK)	83
Italy (FIMI)	8
Netherlands (Single Top 100)	49
Poland (Polish Airplay Charts)	4
Switzerland (Schweizer Hitparade)	98
