= Time (Freddie Mercury song) =

Single by Freddie Mercury

from the album Time
- B-side: "Time (Instrumental version)" (3:20)
- Released: 6 May 1986
- Recorded: 1986
- Genre: Pop
- Length: 2:57 (Original Time LP version); 3:50 (single version); 4:35 (extended mix); 3:18 (2019 remix)
- Label: EMI
- Songwriters: Dave Clark; Jeff Daniels
- Producers: Dave Clark; Freddie Mercury

Freddie Mercury singles chronology
| "Love Me Like There's No Tomorrow" (1985) | "Time" (1986) | "The Great Pretender" (1987) |

"Time" is a 1986 song recorded by Freddie Mercury, along with "In My Defence", for Dave Clark's musical of the same name. Even though Mercury did not appear in the musical itself, both songs were included on the cast album, and "Time" was also released as a separate single, backed by an instrumental version of the song, and reached #32 on the UK Singles Chart. The song also peaked at #12 in Ireland. The single version was later included in the 2000 box set The Solo Collection and the 2006 compilation album Lover of Life, Singer of Songs: The Very Best of Freddie Mercury Solo.

The music video was shot at the Dominion Theatre, London, where the play had been staged since the world premiere of 9 April 1986. Since a matinée and evening performance were scheduled, the only time left for shooting was the early morning: so Mercury and Austrian producer Rudi Dolezal had to meet there at 6.00 in the morning.

== Remixes ==
- "Time (Nile Rodgers 1992 Remix)" is an edit version of the song contained in the 1992 compilation The Freddie Mercury Album and in the Solo Collection. It replaces the piano with a guitar part.
- "Time (2000 Remix)" is almost identical to the single version, except it loses some of the percussion. It is only found in the 2000 box set Solo.
- "Time Waits for No One (2019 Time Remix)" is the demo recording of the song made by Freddie, originally lost and then found by Dave Clark in 2017. He isolated Freddie's vocal and brought in original keyboardist Mike Moran to record a new piano track. The remixed version was released on 20 June 2019. A video to accompany the track was also released. In July 2019, "Time Waits For No One" reached #40 on the Billboard Hot Rock & Alternative Songs chart.

== Personnel ==
From the inner sleeve of Dave Clark's Time the Album:

- Freddie Mercury – lead vocals
- Mike Moran – keyboards
- Ray Russell – guitars
- Brett Morgan – drums
- Alan Jones – bass guitar
- John Christie – backing vocals
- Peter Straker – backing vocals
