= Time (Dave Clark album) =

Dave Clark's "Time": The Album

Studio album by various artists
- Released: April 1986
- Recorded: January – February 1986
- Genre: Pop rock, rock
- Length: 102:09
- Label: EMI, Capitol (US)

Dave Clark's "Time" is a concept album based on Dave Clark's 1986 musical Time. It was released in vinyl as a double LP (Catalog number: AMPM 1, EQ 5003) and in cassette format. It sold over two million copies and spawned five hit singles, one by Julian Lennon and two by Cliff Richard. For Freddie Mercury, 'Time' became a top 40 hit whilst, "In My Defence", became a posthumous hit in 1992.

The album had never been transferred onto digital format until May 8, 2012, when a restored edition of the soundtrack, remastered by Adam Vanryne and produced by Dave Clark, was released on iTunes to commemorate the musical's 25th anniversary. This reissue also features a 20-page color booklet.

== Track listing ==
Side one
No.	Title	Performer	Length
1.	"Born to Rock 'n' Roll" (reached #78 on the UK Singles Chart)	Cliff Richard	4:05
2.	"Time Talkin'"	Ashford & Simpson	4:55
3.	"Time" (reached #32 on the UK Singles Chart)	Freddie Mercury	2:57
4.	"Music of the Spheres/Law of the Universe"	Chris Thompson/Miriam Stockley/Michael Mullins	5:47
5.	"The Time Lord Theme"	John Christie	4:08
6.	"The Charge"	John Christie	1:59
7.	"One Human Family"	Leo Sayer	3:28

Side two
No.	Title	Performer	Length
1.	"What on Earth"	Dionne Warwick	4:09
2.	"I Know I Know"	Leo Sayer	2:59
3.	"Your Brother in Soul"	Jimmy Helms	3:54
4.	"Case for the Prosecution"	John Christie	4:21
5.	"Starmaker"	Ashford & Simpson	4:14
6.	"Time Will Teach Us All"	Julian Lennon/Stevie Wonder	4:36
7.	"I Object (Lord Melchisedic – The Time Lord)"	John Christie	0:49
8.	"In My Defence"	Freddie Mercury	4:16

Side three
No.	Title	Performer	Length
1.	"Within My World"	Dionne Warwick	5:00
2.	"Because" (reached #40 on the UK Singles Chart)	Julian Lennon	3:55
3.	"Move the Judge"	Jimmy Helms	4:48
4.	"She's So Beautiful" (reached #17 on the UK Singles Chart)	Cliff Richard/Stevie Wonder	3:56
5.	"Beauty, Truth, Love, Freedom, Peace"	Laurence Olivier	2:45
6.	"If You Only Knew"	Julian Lennon	5:47

Side four
No.	Title	Performer	Length
1.	"We're the U.F.O."	Murray Head	3:41
2.	""The theme from Time""	Laurence Olivier	4:03
3.	"Harmony"	John Christie	3:43
4.	"The Return (Instrumental)"	Dave Clark, John Christie	2:08
5.	"Time (Reprise) The Rock Star"	Freddie Mercury	1:02
6.	"It's in Everyone of Us" (reached #45 on the UK Singles Chart)	Cliff Richard	4:45

== Charts ==
Chart (1986)	Peak position
Australia (Kent Music Report)	56
UK Albums (OCC)	21

== See also ==
- Time (musical)
- Time (Freddie Mercury song)
- In My Defence
