= Peter Straker =

Jamaican-born singer and actor (born 1943)

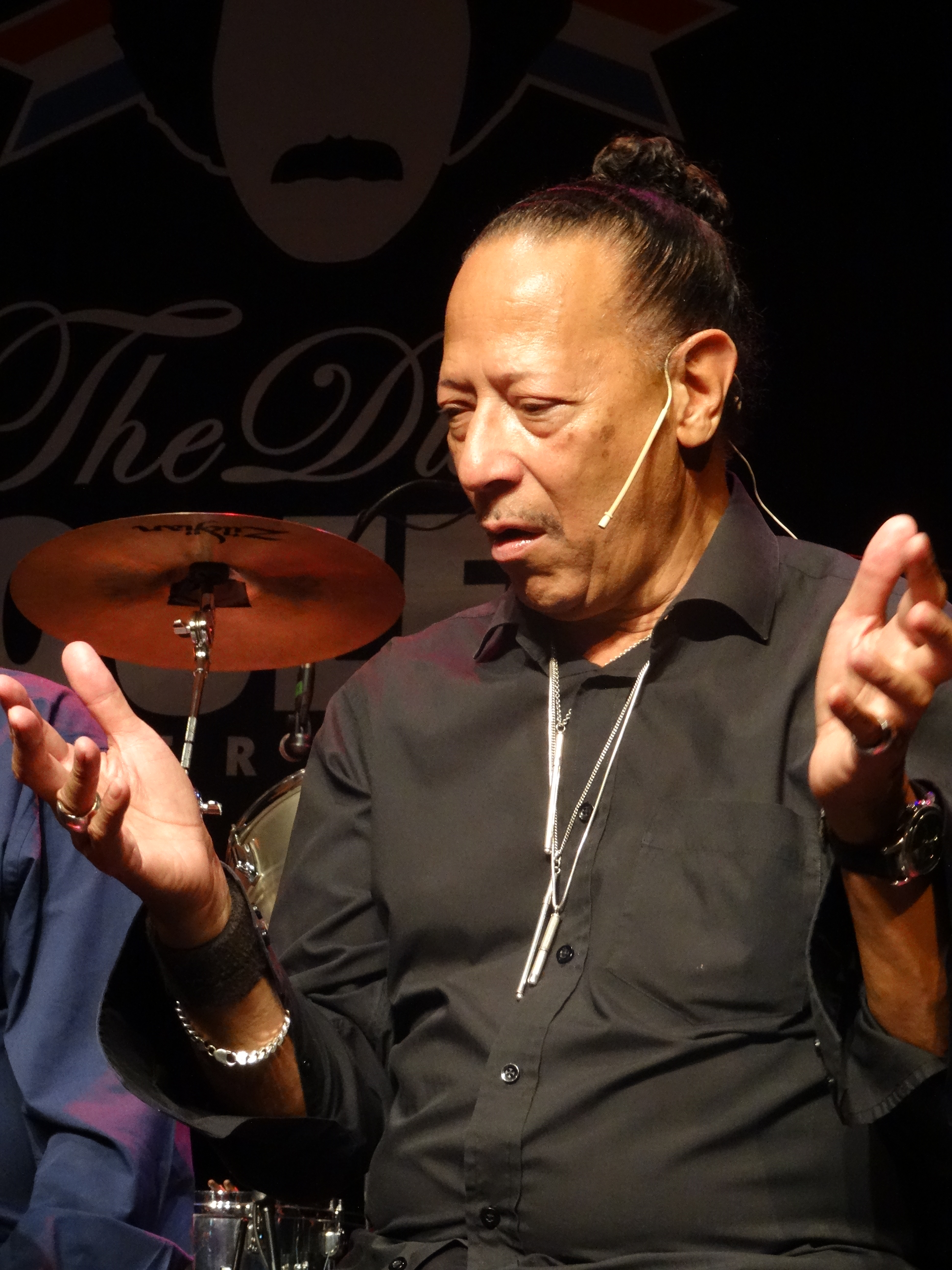
- Straker in 2016
- Born: 7 November 1943 (age 82); Kingston, Jamaica
- Occupation: Singer • songwriter • actor
- Years active: 1960s-present
- Musical career
- Genres: Rock • pop • musical theatre
- Instrument: vocals
- Label: Polydor • RCA Victor • Pye Records • EMI • The Rocket Record Company • Cherry Red Records • Goose Productions Ltd.
- Website: newsite.peterstraker.com

Peter Straker (born 7 November 1943) is a Jamaican-born British singer and actor. Throughout his career, Straker has played in numerous musicals, starting with the original West End production of Hair in 1968 and has recorded several studio albums.

== Life and career ==
Straker was born in Jamaica, and moved to London in his early childhood. He first became known in 1968, when he starred as Hud in the original London production of Hair. Over the next three years, he released a succession of singles on the Polydor label, though none became commercially successful. In 1971 (credited mononymously as Straker), he appeared in the comedy-drama film Girl Stroke Boy, co-written and co-produced by Caryl Brahms and Ned Sherrin.

In 1972, he signed with RCA Victor, and had a minor hit with the song "The Spirit is Willing", based on "Jesu, Joy of Man's Desiring" by J. S. Bach, and adapted by the songwriting duo of Ken Howard and Alan Blaikley, who also produced the single. Credited to "Peter Straker – The Hands of Dr. Teleny", it entered the charts on 19 February 1972, had a chart life of 4 weeks and peaked at No.40. Howard and Blaikley wrote and produced Straker's first album in 1972, Private Parts, based around Straker's reminiscences of his life.

In the mid-1970s he moved to Pye Records, and toured as a singer. He met Freddie Mercury, and they became close friends. Mercury was instrumental in winning Straker a new recording deal with EMI, and co-produced his first album for the label, This One's On Me, with Roy Thomas Baker. Straker's 1978 album, Changeling, produced by Tim Friese-Greene, with most of the songs written by guitarist Mike Allison though several were written or co-written by Straker. In 1979, Straker released the album Real Natural Man, released on Rocket Records. However, the record again found little success, and Straker reconsidered his career direction.

Straker subsequently featured in countless West End productions, including Pete Townshend's Tommy, Ken Hill's Phantom of the Opera, Jeanne at Birmingham Rep and Sadler's Wells, Hot Stuff, Blues in the Night, The Rocky Horror Show, The Rat Pack, One Love and Holding On; both with Ruby Turner. His classical roles include Cassius in Julius Caesar at Bristol Old Vic, and Lucio in Measure for Measure at the National Theatre.

He appeared in Doctor Who (in the 1979 serial Destiny of the Daleks), and the 1985 ITV series Connie, as well as many other television shows including The Gentle Touch and Casualty. Straker also originated the title role of Nosferatu in the British premiere production of Bernard J. Taylor's musical at the Eastbourne Hippodrome in 1995.

He later reprised his role in The Wiz with Birmingham Rep, and starred in The Hackney Empire's Cinderella, The Landor Theatre's The Glorious One's. He returned to the Edinburgh Festival with a new musical show, Peter Straker's Brel which later played at the St James Theatre in London. More recently, Straker has performed in The Queen Elizabeth Hall, London, in a concert performance of Piaf with The Matthew Jones Orchestra. He was announced to be returning to the Who's musical Tommy, which began a UK Tour in 2017.

Cherry Red Records released a 3-CD boxset of Straker's albums on 20 March 2020. Included are remastered versions of This One's On Me, Changeling and Real Natural Man, together with bonus tracks. This was the first time these albums had been released in any format since the 1970s and 80s.

In 2022, Straker released the single Late Night Taxi Dancer (The Italian Job), recorded in collaboration with the Queen tribute band The Royal Band and Italian arranger Gigi Bernardinelli. The song was performed in Montreux at the Freddie Celebration Days and entered the Legacy Chart.

The following year, he released another single, Just Spend This Night With Me, which also charted on the Legacy Chart.

Straker has maintained an active career in musical theatre into the 2020s. In August 2022, he presented Adventures of Straker, a solo musical revue of his stage repertoire, at the Edinburgh Festival Fringe with pianist Gabriele Baldocci.

In April 2025, Straker returned to the London cabaret scene with SOIR NOIR: A Nightclub Confidential at Crazy Coqs.

In August 2025, Straker once again presented a new chapter of his Adventures of Straker revue two nights in a row at the Theatro Technis in Camden. Celebrated actress Jessie Wallace was the guest star of the show and performed a few songs with Straker.

== Selected discography ==
- Hair (Original London Cast Recording) (1968)
- Fresh Hair (Original London Cast Recording) (1970)
- Private Parts (1972)

Produced by Ken Howard & Alan Blaikley

- This One's on Me (1977)

Produced by Freddie Mercury and Roy Thomas Baker

- Changeling (1978)

Produced by Tim Friese-Greene

- Real Natural Man (1980)

Produced by Reinhold Mack & Mike Allison

- Holding On (1993)

Produced by Mike Allison & Antoinne Ellis

- Peter Straker's Brel (2013)
- This One's On Me [3 Disc Set] (2020 - Remastered Albums Boxset)

== Appears on ==
- Hair (musical) Hair (Original Broadway Cast Recording) (1968)
- The Alan Parsons Project: I Robot (1977)
- Freddie Mercury: The Great Pretender (music video) (1987)
- Freddie Mercury and Montserrat Caballé: Barcelona (album) (1988)
- Jeanne The Musical by Shirlie Roden Stage Door Records (2015)
