= In My Defence =

1992 song by Freddie Mercury

Single by Freddie Mercury

from the album Time, The Great Pretender and The Freddie Mercury Album
- Released: 30 November 1992
- Recorded: October 1985
- Studio: Abbey Road (London, England)
- Length: 3:48 (original); 3:52 (remix)
- Label: EMI
- Songwriters: Dave Clark; David Soames; Jeff Daniels
- Producers: Freddie Mercury; Dave Clark; Mack

Freddie Mercury singles chronology
"Guide Me Home/How Can I Go On" (1992)	"In My Defence" (1992)	"The Great Pretender" (1993)

"In My Defence" is a song performed by Queen lead vocalist Freddie Mercury. It was from the 1986 musical Time by Dave Clark and featured on the Time concept album. The song was not a hit during Mercury's lifetime but was released posthumously in November 1992, reaching number eight on the UK Singles Chart.

== Background ==
The song was written by Dave Clark, David Soames and Jeff Daniels for the musical Time. During the musical, Mercury performed the song as a duet with Cliff Richard; this was the last time Mercury sang live in concert; his last performance would be Barcelona in 1988 with Montserrat Caballé, but that performance was lip-synced. Recorded as a solo project, it was recorded at Abbey Road Studios in October 1985, about six months after Mr. Bad Guy was released. The producers expected that if Mercury was not satisfied with the final song, they would let him record with the rest of Queen, but Mercury found the final version satisfactory. "In My Defence" was first released on the Time LP in 1986. Other versions include '(Ron Nevison Mix)' - released on The Freddie Mercury Album and instrumental version (with vocals for the last line) released also on The Solo Collection. The Ron Nevison mix is very similar to the original, but has different bass and drums, while some string parts were added and others were removed. The 2000 Remix is a remastered version of the Ron Nevison mix and has the same instrumentation mixed differently.

== Music video ==
The music video, made after Mercury's death in 1991, was directed by Rudi Dolezal and was a montage featuring outtakes of past music videos, numerous private shots, as well as highlights of Mercury's career. Dolezal wanted the video that showed Mercury being happy and having a good time; much of the footage is the same as the previous "The Show Must Go On" montage also compiled by DoRo Productions consisting of Dolezal and Hannes Rossacher. It also features several quotations from interviews with Mercury, and ends with the line "I still love you" from "These Are the Days of Our Lives".

== Track listings ==
UK 7-inch and cassette

- A. In My Defence
- B. Love Kills (Wolf Euro mix)

UK CD1

1. In My Defence
2. Love Kills (Wolf Euro mix)
3. She Blows Hot and Cold (single version)
4. In My Defence (original version)

UK CD2

1. In My Defence
2. Love Kills (Original Wolf mix)
3. Mr. Bad Guy
4. Living On My Own (Underground Solutions mix)

== Personnel ==
- Freddie Mercury – lead vocals
- Michael Moran – piano
- Paul Vincent – guitars
- Graham Jarvis – drums
- Andy Pask – bass
- Peter Banks – synthesizers
- John Christie – backing vocals

== Charts ==
=== Weekly charts ===
Chart (1992–1993)	Peak position
Europe (Eurochart Hot 100)	33
France (SNEP)	50
Iceland (Íslenski Listinn Topp 40)	2
Ireland (IRMA)	12
UK Singles (Official Charts)	8
UK Airplay (Music Week)	13

=== Year-end charts ===
Chart (1993)	Position
Iceland (Íslenski Listinn Topp 40)	49
