= Love Me Like There's No Tomorrow =

Single by Freddie Mercury

from the album Mr. Bad Guy
- B-side: "Let's Turn It On"
- Released: 18 November 1985
- Length: 3:44
- Label: CBS
- Songwriter(s): Freddie Mercury
- Producer(s): Reinhold Mack; Freddie Mercury

Freddie Mercury singles chronology
| "Living on My Own" (1985) | "Love Me Like There's No Tomorrow" (1985) | "Time" (1986) |

Music video
- "Love Me Like There's No Tomorrow" on YouTube

"Love Me Like There's No Tomorrow" is a song by Freddie Mercury, released in 1985 as the fourth and final single from his debut solo album Mr. Bad Guy. It was written by Mercury, and produced by Reinhold Mack and Mercury. "Love Me Like There's No Tomorrow" reached No. 76 on the UK Singles Chart and remained in the Top 100 for two weeks. According to Peter Freestone, in his book Freddie Mercury: An Intimate Memoir by the Man Who Knew Him Best, "Love Me Like There's No Tomorrow" was inspired by Mercury's relationship with the Austrian actress Barbara Valentin.

On 5 September 2019, an animated music video for the song was released on YouTube to promote the Never Boring compilation album.

== Critical reception ==
Upon its release, Peter Martin of Smash Hits described the song as "one of [Mercury's] propping-up-the-piano-in-the-smoky-bar routines". Tim Parker of Number One commented, "Freddie Mercury tries his hand at a romantic George Michael ballad but ends up doing a Liberace. The king of camp should stick to high energy." In a retrospective review of Mr. Bad Guy, Eduardo Rivadavia of AllMusic considered the song one of the album's "winners", "help[ing] make this an outstanding record from start to finish".

== Track listing ==
7-inch single

1. "Love Me Like There's No Tomorrow" – 3:44
2. "Let's Turn It On" – 3:39

12-inch single

1. "Love Me Like There's No Tomorrow" (Extended Version) – 5:32
2. "Let's Turn It On" (Extended Version) – 5:09

== Personnel ==
- Freddie Mercury - vocals, piano, synthesizer, producer
- Fred Mandel - additional piano and synthesizer
- Stephan Wissnet - bass guitar, assistant engineer, programming
- Curt Cress - drums
- Reinhold Mack - producer, engineer, programming

== Charts ==
| Chart (1985) | Peak position |
|---|---|
| UK Singles Chart | 76 |
