= There Must Be More to Life Than This =

1985 song by Freddie Mercury

Song by Freddie Mercury

from the album Mr. Bad Guy
- Published: Queen Music Ltd.
- Released: 29 April 1985
- Studio: Musicland, West Germany
- Length: 3:00
- Label: Columbia
- Songwriter: Freddie Mercury
- Producers: Reinhold Mack; Freddie Mercury

"There Must Be More to Life Than This" is the eighth track on Queen singer Freddie Mercury's debut solo album Mr. Bad Guy, released on 29 April 1985 by Columbia Records.

The song was originally recorded by Queen for 1982's Hot Space, but failed to make the album. It was later recorded as a duet between Mercury and Michael Jackson, along with two other songs: "State of Shock" (eventually recorded with Mick Jagger for a version by the Jacksons) and "Victory" (which remains unreleased).

== Production ==
Michael Jackson had been a fan of Queen's during their initial breakout in the US, having regularly attended their twelve performances at The Forum between 1977 and 1982. He proposed that he and Mercury collaborate on three songs, to which Mercury agreed.

In 1983, Jackson and Mercury settled at the Jackson family's Hayvenhurst compound for an eight-hour studio session to work on new demos. The duo recorded three songs together – "State of Shock" (written by Jackson), "There Must Be More to Life Than This" (written by Mercury), and "Victory". According to Mercury's personal assistant Peter Freestone, the demo of "There Must Be More to Life Than This" features Jackson on lead vocals and Mercury on the piano. As the lyrics of the song were still unfinished, Mercury asked Jackson to improvise during the recording.

Due to scheduling difficulties, Jackson and Mercury were not able to finish their collaboration. Said Mercury, "We had three tracks in the can, but unfortunately they were never finished. They were great songs, but the problem was time — as we were both very busy at that period. We never seemed to be in the same country long enough to actually finish anything completely." Despite that, numerous reports have appeared in the press, claiming Mercury and Jackson's opposing personalities and the latter's insistence that one or more of his pets be allowed to attend recording sessions as the reasons the collaboration did not take place any further. Freestone confirmed Mercury's account, saying,

The thing is, all of this about they hated each other, that [Jackson] wouldn't talk to [Mercury] because of drugs... It's rubbish. The reason that [Mercury]'s version of "State of Shock" never came out was because he could never get there for mixing. Because [of] his touring, recording, everything – the timing just wouldn't work.

Mercury was able to secure the rights to "There Must Be More to Life Than This", leading to it becoming a track on Mr. Bad Guy. The other two, "State of Shock" and "Victory", are principally controlled by Jackson's estate.

== Queen and Michael Jackson version ==
"There Must Be More to Life Than This"

Song by Queen featuring Michael Jackson

from the album Queen Forever
- Published: Queen Music Ltd.
- Released: 10 November 2014
- Recorded: 1983 (original); 2014 (reworked)
- Length: 3:27
- Songwriter: Freddie Mercury
- Producer: William Orbit

After Michael Jackson's death in 2009, Queen guitarist Brian May and drummer Roger Taylor took steps to secure all three Mercury/Jackson duets, with a view to releasing them in 2012. However, Taylor likened dealing with Jackson's estate to "wading through glue". Eventually, the parties agreed for "There Must Be More to Life Than This" alone to be released. "I was very pleased we had three new tracks to put on Queen Forever," said Taylor. "As well as the Michael Jackson track 'There Must Be More to Life than This', there is another song Freddie did with him, called 'State of Shock', with a massive rock sound. But we could only have one track with Michael, which is a great shame."

The version on Queen Forever was produced and mixed by William Orbit, containing the original backing track from the Hot Space sessions with May on guitar, Taylor on drums and John Deacon on bass. An alternative mix by May was rejected in favour of Orbit's.

=== Personnel ===
- Freddie Mercury – lead and backing vocals, piano
- Brian May – guitars
- John Deacon – bass guitar
- Roger Taylor – drums, percussion
- Michael Jackson – co-lead vocals

== Charts ==
Chart performance for "There Must Be More to Life Than This"
Chart (2014)	Peak position
Belgium (Ultratip Bubbling Under Wallonia)	45
Japan Hot 100 (Billboard)	39
