= Barcelona (Freddie Mercury and Montserrat Caballé album) =

Studio album by Freddie Mercury and Montserrat Caballé
- Released: 10 October 1988
- Recorded: January 1987 – June 1988
- Studios: Townhouse and Mountain Studios
- Genres: Opera; classical crossover
- Length: 39:56
- Languages: English; Spanish; Japanese
- Labels: Polydor; Hollywood
- Producers: Freddie Mercury; Mike Moran; David Richards; 2012 reissue produced and orchestrated by Stuart Morley

Freddie Mercury chronology
Mr. Bad Guy (1985)	Barcelona (1988)	The Freddie Mercury Album (1992)

Alternative cover
- 2012 reissue cover

Singles from Barcelona
- 1. "Barcelona" Released: 26 October 1987; 2. "The Golden Boy" Released: 24 October 1988; 3. "How Can I Go On" Released: 23 January 1989

Professional ratings
Review scores
Source	Rating
AllMusic	2.5/5 stars
Entertainment Weekly	B'
MusicHound Rock	2/5 stars

Barcelona is a collaborative studio album recorded by Freddie Mercury, lead singer of popular British rock band Queen, and operatic soprano Montserrat Caballé. It was released in 1988 and serves as the second and final album by Mercury to be recorded outside of Queen.

After Barcelona was selected to host the 1992 Summer Olympics, Mercury was approached to write a song as a theme for the forthcoming games. The idea was to create a duet with Caballé, as she was from the city. He had been a long-standing admirer of her and she in turn grew to respect his talents very highly. They decided to work on an album together, with Mercury and Mike Moran taking the creative lead as songwriters. Mercury and Moran made and sent her tapes of the music with Mercury singing in falsetto as a guide vocal for Montserrat's parts. As they rarely had an opening in their schedule to meet, her parts were recorded at another location.

A special edition of the album was released on 3 September 2012. It features a new version of the album with the previous instrumental tracks replaced with new, live symphonic orchestration and percussion rather than synthesizers and drum machines. The new edition also has a new unique album cover.

== Track listing ==
All tracks are written by Freddie Mercury and Mike Moran, except where noted.

No.	Title	Writer(s)	Length
1.	"Barcelona"		5:37
2.	"La Japonaise"		4:49
3.	"The Fallen Priest"	Mercury; Moran; Tim Rice	5:46
4.	"Ensueño"	Mercury; Moran; Montserrat Caballé	4:27
5.	"The Golden Boy"	Mercury; Moran; Rice	6:04
6.	"Guide Me Home"		2:49
7.	"How Can I Go On"		3:51
8.	"Overture Piccante"		6:40
Total length:			39:56

== Content ==
=== "Barcelona" ===
The song was composed and produced by Mike Moran and Freddie Mercury. The recording sessions include violins by Homi Kanga and Laurie Lewis, cello by Deborah Ann Johnston, horn by Barry Castle and percussion by Frank Ricotti. "Barcelona" was chosen to be the anthem of 1992 Olympics in Spain, but Mercury died less than seven months before the games. It was, however, featured as the city introductory video at the opening ceremony, and it was used as the title music to the BBC's coverage of the 1992 Summer Olympics. The music video was filmed at the world's largest nightclub, Ku, nowadays named Privilege in Ibiza.

Russell Watson covers it on his album The Voice with Shaun Ryder.

=== "La Japonaise" ===
The song was recorded on 9 November 1987 (an early demo comes from 1 September). Mercury wrote all the lyrics including the ones in Japanese, and sang some parts in falsetto which were kept on the final version.

=== "The Fallen Priest" ===
Originally a virtuoso piano piece by Moran with some high vocals from Mercury, it was named "Rachmaninov's Revenge" (demos come from 26 January and 19 February respectively). Then it was named "The Duet" and finally "The Fallen Priest" when Tim Rice wrote the lyrics for it. Elaine Paige was living with Rice at the time and she was working on an album of Queen covers. Also released in 1987 it was also produced by Moran who conducted the orchestra, wrote the arrangements and played piano and keyboards. The ending piano riff bears a strong resemblance to the ending of the first movement of Russian composer Sergei Rachmaninov's Piano Concerto No. 2.

=== "Ensueño" ===
When Mercury first met Montserrat Caballé in March 1987, he brought in a piece he and Moran had composed called "Exercises in Free Love", to which Caballé added lyrics and which became "Ensueño" later on. She asked him to sing it in his natural speaking (baritone) voice. Unlike "Exercises", "Ensueño" does not include any orchestration or backing vocals: Mike Moran plays only a piano part as an accompaniment for the two singers.

=== "The Golden Boy" ===
This song also included lyrics from Rice and was recorded on 1 December 1987 (early demos come from 2 May and 9 November). The celebrity gospel choir featured Madeline Bell, Dennis Bishop, Lance Ellington, Miriam Stockley, Peter Straker, Mark Williamson, and Carol Woods. Straker was Mercury's friend who helped him out with some lyrics of "I'm Going Slightly Mad", and Stockley sang later on with Brian May.

=== "Guide Me Home" ===
Originally titled "Freddie's Overture", it was one of the last numbers to be written (early 1988). The song was combined with the 12" and CD single release of "How Can I Go On" in 1989. "Overture Piccante" was the extra track. Guide Me Home was released as a stand alone track on the maxi CD single in the Netherlands in 2000.

=== "How Can I Go On" ===
This song comes from spring 1987. On the album its beginning is seamlessly merged with the end of the previous track "Guide Me Home". It features fellow Queen member John Deacon on bass. "How Can I Go On" was released as a 2-track 7-inch, 3-track 12-inch vinyl and a CD single.

=== "Overture Piccante" ===
The last track on the album mixes parts of other tracks into a new piece.

== Special edition (2012) ==
The 2012 special edition replaces original instrumentation, created using synthesizers and samplers, with a full symphonic orchestra. "Ensueño", the fourth track, which originally featured only Mercury and Caballé singing over Moran's solo piano, was left unaltered, while the backing track to "Exercises in Free Love" was re-orchestrated and re-recorded.

The score was transcribed and re-orchestrated by Stuart Morley, the musical director for Queen's musical We Will Rock You, who is also the album's producer. Morley listened to the original record to capture the harmony and leading parts, then re-orchestrated the score with traditional paper, pen and eraser, using Rimsky-Korsakov's "Treatise on Orchestration" and "Scheherazade", Tchaikovsky's "Fourth Symphony" and Debussy's "La Mer" as a reference.

The score was performed by the Prague FILMharmonic Orchestra. Naoko Kikuchi recorded a koto part for "La Japonaise", while Rufus Taylor, the son of Queen member Roger Taylor, recorded drums for "The Golden Boy" and "How Can I Go On", and classical violinist David Garrett recorded a new violin solo for the latter. John Deacon's bass guitar remained in "How Can I Go On".

=== Track listing ===
==== Disc one – New orchestrated album ====
1. "Barcelona" – 5:43
2. "La Japonaise" – 4:52
3. "The Fallen Priest" – 5:46
4. "Ensueño" – 4:22
5. "The Golden Boy" – 6:04
6. "Guide Me Home" – 2:50
7. "How Can I Go On" – 3:49
8. "Exercises in Free Love" – 3:57
9. "Overture Piccante" – 6:47
10. "How Can I Go On" [Bonus Track featuring David Garrett] – 3:56

==== Disc two – The Best of the Rarities and Session Outtakes ====
1. "Exercises in Free Love" [1987 B-side] – 4:26
2. "Barcelona" [Early Version: Freddie's Demo Vocal] – 4:21
3. "La Japonaise" [Early Version: Freddie's Demo Vocal] – 4:41
4. "Rachmaninov's Revenge (The Fallen Priest)" [Later Version: Freddie's Demo Vocal] – 5:51
5. "Ensueño" [Monsterrat's Live Takes] – 5:36
6. "The Golden Boy" [Early Version: Freddie's Demo Vocal] – 3:54
7. "Guide Me Home" [Alternative Version] – 2:50
8. "How Can I Go On" [Alternative Version] – 4:03
9. "How Can I Go On" [Alternative Piano Version] – 3:44

==== Disc three – Album orchestral version ====
1. "Barcelona" [Instrumental] – 5:39
2. "La Japonaise" [Instrumental] – 4:51
3. "The Fallen Priest" [Instrumental] – 5:47
4. "Ensueño" [Instrumental] – 4:01
5. "The Golden Boy" [Instrumental] – 6:03
6. "Guide Me Home" [Instrumental] – 2:50
7. "How Can I Go On" [Instrumental] – 3:37
8. "Exercises in Free Love" [Instrumental] – 3:57
9. "Overture Piccante" [Instrumental] – 6:43
- On this CD, "Ensueño" consists only of Moran's (original) piano part. No backing vocals are featured on any of the tracks.

==== Disc four – DVD ====
- Club Ibiza Performance
1. "Barcelona"
- La Nit Barcelona Performance
1. "Barcelona"
2. "How Can I Go On"
3. "The Golden Boy"
- Barcelona [Classic Video]
- Barcelona [The Special Edition EPK]
- Barcelona [2012 Edit by Rhys Thomas]

== Musicians ==
- Freddie Mercury – lead vocals and backing vocals, piano, arrangements
- Montserrat Caballé – lead vocals and backing vocals
- Mike Moran – keyboards, programming, arrangements
- John Deacon – bass guitar ("How Can I Go On")
- Homi Kanga – violin ("Barcelona")
- Laurie Lewis – violin ("Barcelona")
- Deborah Ann Johnston – cello ("Barcelona")
- Barry Castle – French horn ("Barcelona")
- Frank Ricotti – percussion ("Barcelona")
- Madeline Bell – backing vocals ("The Golden Boy")
- Dennis Bishop – backing vocals ("The Golden Boy")
- Lance Ellington – backing vocals ("The Golden Boy")
- Miriam Stockley – backing vocals ("The Golden Boy")
- Peter Straker – backing vocals ("The Golden Boy")
- Mark Williamson – backing vocals ("The Golden Boy")
- Carol Woods – backing vocals ("The Golden Boy")

== Charts ==
Chart (1988–89)	Peak position
Austrian Albums (Ö3 Austria)	24
Dutch Albums (Album Top 100)	10
German Albums (Offizielle Top 100)	41
Japanese Albums (Oricon)	93
New Zealand Albums (RMNZ)	13
Swedish Albums (Sverigetopplistan)	37
Swiss Albums (Schweizer Hitparade)	18
UK Albums (Official Charts)	25

Chart (1992)	Peak position
UK Albums (Official Charts)	15

Chart (2012)	Peak position
Belgian Albums (Ultratop Flanders)	114
Belgian Albums (Ultratop Wallonia)	107
Italian Albums (FIMI)	52
Scottish Albums (Official Charts)	53

== Certifications ==
Region	Certification	Certified units/sales
Spain (Promusicae)	Platinum	100,000^{^}
Switzerland (IFPI Switzerland)	Platinum	50,000^{^}
United Kingdom (BPI)	Silver	60,000^{^}
^{^} Shipments figures based on certification alone.
