= Barcelona (Freddie Mercury and Montserrat Caballé song) =

1987 single by Freddie Mercury and Montserrat Caballé

Single by Freddie Mercury and Montserrat Caballé

from the album Barcelona
- B-side: "Exercises in Free Love"
- Released: 26 October 1987
- Recorded: 1987
- Genre: Classical crossover
- Length: 4:28 (single version); 5:39 (album version, 1988); 7:04 (extended version)
- Label: Polydor
- Songwriters: Freddie Mercury; Mike Moran
- Producers: Freddie Mercury; Mike Moran; David Richards

Freddie Mercury singles chronology
"The Great Pretender" (1987)	"Barcelona" (1987)	"The Golden Boy" (1988)

Music video
- "Barcelona" (4K video) on YouTube

"Barcelona" is a single released by Queen vocalist Freddie Mercury and operatic soprano Montserrat Caballé. A part of their collaborative album Barcelona, it also appeared on Queen's Greatest Hits III.

The song reflects Mercury's love of opera with his high notes and Caballé's operatic vocals, backed by a full orchestra. Originally released in 1987, it was one of the biggest hits of Mercury's solo career, reaching number eight in the UK singles chart. After Mercury's death in 1991, it was featured at the 1992 Summer Olympics. The single was re-issued on 20 July 1992, after which the track climbed even higher, peaking at number two in the UK, the Netherlands and New Zealand.

In 2004, BBC Radio 2 listed Barcelona at number 41 in its Sold On Song Top 100.

== History ==
Mercury had been a long-time fan of opera, and especially Montserrat Caballé. In 1986, he mentioned on Spanish television that he would like to meet her, and they met for the first time in Barcelona in February 1987. Later, when the city had been chosen for the 1992 Summer Olympics, Caballé, a native of the city, was asked to help produce a song for the games. She asked Mercury to collaborate. Caballé became enthusiastic about the project and instead of recording a single, she proposed to make an album, to which Mercury agreed. "Barcelona", their proposed opening song, had to be completed by 1988 in time to be entered as a candidate for the 1992 Olympic theme. The selection was scheduled for 1988, four years before the Games. The recording was complicated by Caballé's tight schedule; to save time, Mercury recorded the song, singing Caballé's part in falsetto. He would then send a tape to Caballé to prepare her for the joint studio sessions.

== The song ==
The song was co-written by Mercury with Mike Moran, who also appeared in its video and played piano and all keyboards for the studio recording. The song starts with an orchestral introduction, which fades and is followed by Mercury and Caballé singing alternately their solo lines, sometimes merging into a duet. When singing the chorus "Barcelona" and a few other parts for the studio version, Mercury dubs over his voice in his usual multi-tracking style. Mercury leads the song whereas Caballé provides a powerful background soprano. Since Caballé covers the soprano part, Mercury sings in his natural baritone voice rather than the forced tenor that was common in his other recordings.

The song has been described as a rare example of a combination of pop and opera singing which accentuated their differences. Whereas Mercury articulates his every word, Caballé focuses on the tone; her lines are much harder to comprehend, and further, she uses both English and Spanish languages. Consequently, she keeps her part melodic throughout all the song at the expense of the text, whereas Mercury has to resort from singing to nearly shouting at the crescendo part in order to deliver his words. Mercury was reportedly amazed by the legendary ability of Caballé to control her voice; for example, in the fadeout, Mercury moves away from the microphone to decrease his vocal dynamic, whereas Montserrat relies on her classical training to decrease the dynamic.

=== Music video ===
In October 1987, the official music video was released, directed by David Mallet, who had collaborated with Queen on their previous videos. Mike Moran, who co-wrote the song, appears in the video conducting the orchestra with a light stick. Moran is sometimes incorrectly assumed by viewers to be Mercury's Queen bandmate Brian May, due to his similar hairstyle. In 2019, the original 35 mm film was scanned and digitally remastered into 4K resolution.

=== Versions ===
In 2000, The Solo Collection the Rarities 2 disc contained an early version with different lyrics, running 4:21, and a later version running 4:41 as well as on the Singles disc, an extended version lasting 7:07.

== Personnel ==
- Freddie Mercury – vocals, arrangements
- Montserrat Caballé – vocals
- Mike Moran – keyboard, programming, arrangements
- Homi Kanga – violin
- Laurie Lewis – violin
- Deborah Ann Johnston – cello
- Barry Castle – French horn
- Frank Ricotti – percussion

== Live performance ==
The song was first performed live in May 1987, at the Ibiza festival, held at the Ku nightclub (now Privilege Ibiza, the "world's largest nightclub").

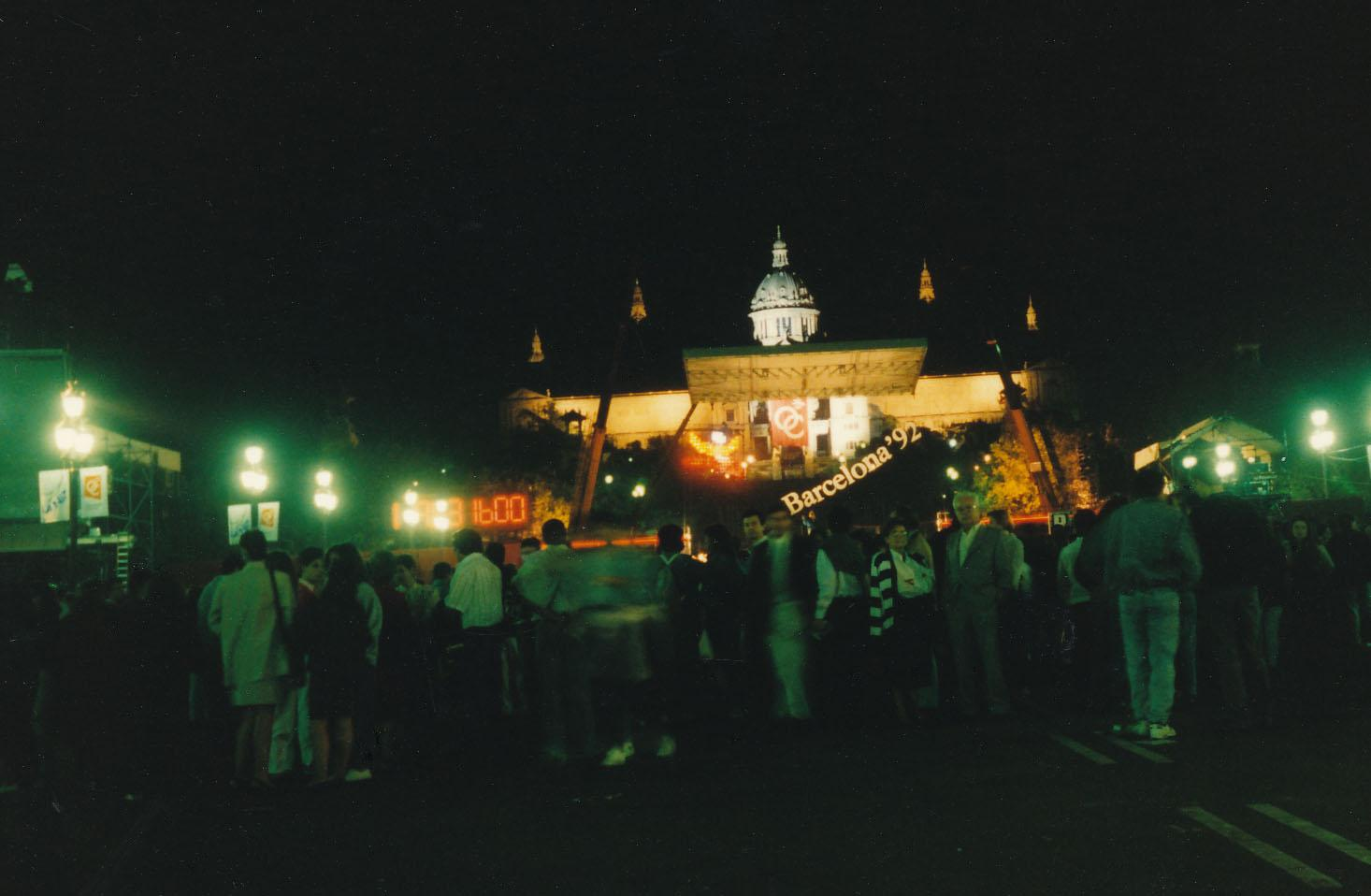
Festival "La Nit", Barcelona, 8 October 1988, Freddie Mercury's final concert

Its next important performance occurred on 8 October 1988, at the open air La Nit festival in Barcelona, which was staged on the occasion of the arrival of the Olympic flag from Seoul. Together, Mercury and Caballé sang three tracks from the forthcoming album Barcelona, namely "Barcelona", "How Can I Go On" and "The Golden Boy". This was the last live performance by Mercury, who was already beginning to suffer from AIDS. He died in 1991, so the recording of the song was played over a travelogue of the city at the start of the international broadcast of the opening ceremony of the 1992 Summer Olympics.

Prior to the start of the 1999 UEFA Champions League Final between Manchester United F.C. and FC Bayern Munich held at the Camp Nou stadium in Barcelona, Caballé performed "Barcelona" live, accompanied by a recording of Mercury, who also appeared on the stadium's electronic screen.

== Legacy ==
In 2025, the City of Barcelona announced plans to erect a statue of Mercury and Caballé in the Plaça de les Glòries Catalanes to settle what Mayor Jaume Collboni called a “pending debt” with the two artists for their contributions to the Barcelona Olympics.

== Charts ==
=== Weekly charts ===
Chart (1987–1988)	Peak position
Australia (Kent Music Report)	85
Ireland (IRMA)	8
Netherlands (Single Top 100)	37
Sweden (Sverigetopplistan)	15
UK Singles (OCC)	8
West Germany (GfK)	32

Chart (1992)	Peak position
Australia (ARIA)	42
Belgium (Ultratop 50 Flanders)	21
France (SNEP)	6
Ireland (IRMA)	3
Netherlands (Dutch Top 40)	2
Netherlands (Single Top 100)	2
New Zealand (Recorded Music NZ)	2
Portugal (AFP)	9
Sweden (Sverigetopplistan)	12
Switzerland (Schweizer Hitparade)	8
UK Singles (OCC)	2
UK Airplay (Music Week)	13

Chart (2018)	Peak position
Scotland Singles (Official Charts)	63

=== Year-end charts ===
Chart (1992)	Position
Netherlands (Dutch Top 40)	31
Netherlands (Single Top 100)	30

== Certifications ==
Region	Certification	Certified units/sales
United Kingdom (BPI)	Silver	200,000^{‡}
^{‡} Sales+streaming figures based on certification alone.

== Distribution ==
The single was distributed on 7-inch and 12-inch vinyl records and 5" CDs, all with Polydor labels. The 5" CD and 7" record, but not the 12" record, were reissued in 1992; a 3" CD was issued as a promotional-only to record company executives in Japan in 1992. The B-side of nearly all records contained "Exercises in Free Love" from The Freddie Mercury Album. The 1992 version of the 7" Spanish record had another version of "Barcelona" on the B-side, and the rare 1987 12" Hong Kong record was one-sided and had a unique sleeve. Most 5" CDs contained two or three versions of "Barcelona" and "Exercises in Free Love". Most 7" record and 5" CD covers featured Mercury and Caballé singing on a stage with an orchestra on the background, though the Portuguese version pictured them in a static studio photo. The 1992 reissue 7" records contained another version of the singing artists, with no orchestra.

== Bibliography ==
- Freestone, Peter & Evans, David (2001). Freddie Mercury: An Intimate Memoir by the Man who Knew Him Best. Omnibus Press. ISBN 978-0-7119-8674-9.
