= The Golden Boy =

Single by Freddie Mercury & Montserrat Caballé

from the album Barcelona
- B-side: "The Fallen Priest"
- Released: 24 October 1988
- Recorded: 1987
- Genre: Classical crossover, gospel
- Length: 6:05
- Label: Polydor
- Composers: Freddie Mercury; Mike Moran
- Lyricist: Tim Rice
- Producers: Mercury; Moran; David Richards

Freddie Mercury singles chronology
"Barcelona" (1987)	"The Golden Boy" (1988)	"How Can I Go On" (1988)

Professional ratings
Review scores
Source	Rating
Number One	3.5/5 stars

"The Golden Boy" is a song recorded by Queen frontman Freddie Mercury together with spanish operatic soprano Montserrat Caballé.

== Overview ==
Originally included in the 1988 album Barcelona, the song was released as a 45 rpm two weeks after its appearance in the main album, with another excerpt from the LP, "The Fallen Priest", as the B-side. An instrumental version of the song was included in both the 12" vinyl and the 5" CD single releases. The single reached #86 in the UK Singles Chart.

== Personnel ==
- Freddie Mercury – vocals, piano, arrangements
- Montserrat Caballe – vocals
- Mike Moran – keyboards, programming, arrangements
- Madeline Bell – backing vocals
- Dennis Bishop – backing vocals
- Lance Ellington – backing vocals
- Miriam Stockley – backing vocals
- Peter Straker – backing vocals
- Mark Williamson – backing vocals
- Carol Woods – backing vocals

== Releases and track listing ==
7" vinyl single
No.	Title	Writer(s)	Length
1.	"The Golden Boy"	Freddie Mercury, Mike Moran, Tim Rice	6:05
2.	"The Fallen Priest"	Freddie Mercury, Mike Moran, Tim Rice	5:46

12" vinyl; 5" CD singles
No.	Title	Length
1.	"The Golden Boy"	6:05
2.	"The Fallen Priest"	5:46
3.	"The Golden Boy (Instrumental)"	6:05

== Videoclip ==
The song's music video is footage of the artists' miming performance at the open air "La Nit" festival in Barcelona on 8 October 1988 (Mercury's last live performance before his illness got worse), where the song was performed along with "Barcelona" and "How Can I Go On". The video was first released as part of a 5" CD video single.

== Charts ==
=== Weekly charts ===
Chart (1988)	Peak position
Italy Airplay (Music & Media)	17
UK Singles (Official Charts)	86
