= I Was Born to Love You (song) =

1985 single by Freddie Mercury

Single by Freddie Mercury

from the album Mr. Bad Guy
- A-side: "I Was Born to Love You" (extended version, 12-inch single only)
- B-side: "Stop All the Fighting"
- Released: 8 April 1985
- Recorded: 1984
- Studio: Musicland Studios, Munich
- Genre: Synth-pop; dance-pop
- Length: 3:37 (7-inch and album version); 7:03 (12-inch extended version)
- Label: CBS
- Songwriter: Freddie Mercury
- Producers: Reinhold Mack; Freddie Mercury

Freddie Mercury singles chronology
"Love Kills" (1984)	"I Was Born to Love You" (1985)	"Made in Heaven" (1985)

Music video
- "I Was Born to Love You" on YouTube

"I Was Born to Love You"
- 2004 Artwork for Japanese release

Single by Queen

from the album Made in Heaven
- Released: 28 February 1996 (Japan only)
- Recorded: 1984, 1993–1995
- Length: 4:49
- Label: EMI
- Songwriter: Freddie Mercury
- Producer: Queen

Queen singles chronology
"A Winter's Tale" (1995)	"I Was Born to Love You" (1996)	"Too Much Love Will Kill You" (1996)

Music video
- "I Was Born to Love You" (2004 music video version) on YouTube

"I Was Born to Love You (Live at Summer Sonic, Tokyo, Japan, 2014)"

Single by Queen + Adam Lambert

from the album Live Around the World
- Released: 25 September 2020
- Recorded: 17 August 2014
- Venue: Summer Sonic
- Length: 4:04
- Label: EMI
- Producers: Brian May; Roger Taylor

Queen + Adam Lambert singles chronology
"The Show Must Go On (Live at O2 Arena, 4 July 2018)" (2020)	"I Was Born to Love You (Live at Summer Sonic, Tokyo, Japan, 2014)" (2020)

Music video
- "I Was Born to Love You" (Live) on YouTube

"I Was Born to Love You" is a 1985 song by Freddie Mercury that was released as a single from his only solo album, Mr. Bad Guy. After Mercury's death, Queen re-worked this song for their album Made in Heaven in 1995, by having the other members play their instrumental parts over the original track. The Queen version from the Made in Heaven album also includes snippets of Mercury's ad-lib vocals taken from "A Kind of Magic" and from "Living on My Own".

The song received its live debut on the 2005 tour of Japan, given by Queen + Paul Rodgers. Brian May and Roger Taylor performed the song acoustically. The song was also performed during the concerts given by Queen + Adam Lambert in South Korea and Japan, which was the first time that a full live band was used for the performance.

== Music videos ==
The video for the original Freddie Mercury version of the song was directed by David Mallet and filmed at the now demolished Limehouse Studios, London. The video was choreographed by Arlene Phillips and shows Mercury singing in front of a wall of mirrors, then running through a house with a woman before dancing on a podium.

The video for the version used on Made in Heaven was directed by Richard Heslop for the British Film Institute, and included on Made in Heaven: The Films. It shows inhabitants of a block of council flats. Couples kiss, kids play, and teenagers steal and destroy a car in a monochrome film. The audio also uses the vinyl edit.

For the 2004 re-release, a video was created mixing footage of Mercury's original solo video intercut with footage of Queen performing live at Wembley Stadium, plus his solo video "Living on My Own". This video is included on Queen Jewels, the 2004 Greatest Karaoke Hits DVD, and the Japanese release of the documentary Days of Our Lives.

== Appearances in other media ==
The song has appeared in multiple television advertisements, mainly in Japan. The original version recorded by Mercury appeared in the TV commercial of Japanese cosmetics company Noevia in the mid 1980s. The Queen version was released as a single exclusively in Japan in February 1996, because the song was used in a TV ad for Kirin Ichiban Shibori, one of the best-selling liquors of the country produced by the Kirin Brewery Company. The single became their first song that entered the Japanese chart since "Teo Torriatte (Let Us Cling Together)", released in 1977.

In 2004, Queen's version was used as the theme for Pride, the successful Japanese drama starring Takuya Kimura and Yūko Takeuchi. Jewels, Queen's tie-in compilation album released only in Japan, includes "I Was Born to Love You". A cover of Queen's version was included in the 2006 video game Elite Beat Agents.

In Malaysia, Mercury's version, using a different mix, was used by Astro in TV advertisements to promote their coverage of the 2018 FIFA World Cup. The advertisement, commissioned by Astro through agency Dentsu LHS Malaysia and created by Pesona Pictures Indonesia, also have an unused version, which used Queen's version of the song.

== Track listings ==
7-inch single (1985)

A. "I Was Born to Love You" – 3:37
B. "Stop All the Fighting" – 3:17

12-inch single (1985)

A. "I Was Born to Love You" (Extended Version) – 7:03
B. "Stop All the Fighting" – 3:17

== Personnel ==
Original version

- Freddie Mercury – lead vocals, piano, synthesizer, Synclavier
- Fred Mandel – synthesizer, rhythm guitar
- Paul Vincent – lead guitar
- Curt Cress – drums
- Stephan Wissnet – bass guitar, Fairlight CMI
- Reinhold Mack – Fairlight CMI, Synclavier II

Queen version

- Freddie Mercury – lead and backing vocals, piano, keyboards
- Brian May – guitars, keyboards
- Roger Taylor – drums, percussion
- John Deacon – bass guitar

== Chart history ==
Freddie Mercury version

Chart (1985)	Peak position
Australia (Kent Music Report)	19
Austria (Ö3 Austria Top 40)	20
Belgium (Ultratop 50 Flanders)	35
Ireland (IRMA)	7
Japanese Oricon Singles Chart	55
Netherlands (Dutch Top 40)	34
South African Singles Chart	4
Switzerland (Schweizer Hitparade)	24
UK Singles (OCC)	11
US Billboard Hot 100	76
West Germany (GfK)	17
Chart (2026)	Peak position
Poland (Polish Airplay Top 100)	63

Queen version

Year	Chart	Peak position
1996	Japanese Oricon Chart	45
2004	Japanese Oricon Chart	1 (Re-Entry)

Chart (2018)	Peak position
Japan Hot 100 (Billboard)	63

Worlds Apart version

Chart (1997)	Peak position
West Germany (GfK)	71

== Certifications ==
Region	Certification	Certified units/sales
Japan (RIAJ) Physical	Gold	100,000^{^}
Japan (RIAJ) Ringtone	2× Platinum	500,000^{*}
Japan (RIAJ) Full-length ringtone	Gold	100,000^{*}
^{*} Sales figures based on certification alone.^{^} Shipments figures based on certification alone.
