= Living on My Own =

1985 single by Freddie Mercury

Single by Freddie Mercury

from the album Mr. Bad Guy
- B-side: "My Love Is Dangerous"
- Released: 2 September 1985
- Studio: Musicland (Munich, West Germany)
- Length: 3:21 (album version); 3:03 (single version)
- Label: CBS
- Songwriter: Freddie Mercury
- Producers: Reinhold Mack; Freddie Mercury

Freddie Mercury singles chronology
"Made in Heaven" (1985)	"Living on My Own" (1985)	"Love Me Like There's No Tomorrow" (1985)

Music video
- "Living on My Own" on YouTube

"Living on My Own" is a song written and performed by British singer-songwriter Freddie Mercury, originally included on his first solo album, Mr. Bad Guy (1985). It was released as a single (backed with "My Love Is Dangerous") on 2 September 1985 by CBS in the United Kingdom, where it peaked at number 50. The July 1985 release in the United States had "She Blows Hot and Cold" as its B-side.

Eight years later, in 1993, "Living on My Own" was remixed by Belgian producers No More Brothers and re-released to widespread chart success. The song's lyrics reflect Mercury's longstanding admiration for Greta Garbo, whose quotations are featured prominently in the lyrics. The accompanying music video was directed by Hannes Rossacher and Rudi Dolezal, and features footage of Mercury's 39th birthday celebration at a nightclub in Munich, West Germany.

== 1993 No More Brothers' Mix version ==
"Living on My Own" (remix)

Single by Freddie Mercury

from the album Remixes
- Released: 19 July 1993
- Genre: House
- Length: 3:38
- Label: Parlophone
- Songwriter: Freddie Mercury
- Producers: Serge Ramaekers; Colin Peter; Carl Ward

Freddie Mercury singles chronology
"The Great Pretender" (1993)	"Living on My Own" (remix) (1993)	"Guide Me Home" (2000)

Music video
- "Living on My Own" (remix) on YouTube

On 19 July 1993, almost two years after Mercury's death, the No More Brothers Mix of "Living on My Own" was released by Parlophone. This remix, produced by Serge Ramaekers, Colin Peter and Carl Ward, reached number one in the UK, Ireland, and France, becoming Mercury's first solo number-one hit. In the US, the 1993 version was not officially released. It remained at the top for two weeks on the British charts. Mercury was given a posthumous award for International Hit of the Year with "Living On My Own" at the Ivor Novello Awards in May 1994.

=== Critical reception ===
Tom Ewing of Freaky Trigger stated that Mercury "sounds terrific over house music". Pan-European magazine Music & Media wrote that the Belgian dance producers "picked up a Mercury vocal track, put it on top of sequencers—with surprising results—and made a local top 10 hit out of it". Music & Media editor Robbert Tilli complimented it as a "inventive dance remix" by production company Say No More. John Kilgo from The Network Forty said that "hitting you over the head like a hammer, the harmony-laden hook compliments (sic) an uptempo groove". A reviewer from Sandwell Evening Mail named it "a stunning Euro-style remix".

=== Chart performance ===
The 1993 No More Brothers Mix of "Living on My Own" peaked at number one in Denmark, France, Greece, Iceland, Ireland, Israel, Italy, Norway, Spain, Sweden, and the United Kingdom, as well as on the Eurochart Hot 100. In the UK, it hit the top spot in its third week on the UK Singles Chart, on 8 August 1993; the single spent two weeks at the top of the chart and 13 weeks within the UK Top 100. Additionally, it reached number two in Austria, Belgium, Germany, and Switzerland. In these countries, it was held off reaching number one by 4 Non Blondes' "What's Up". "Living on My Own" debuted on the Eurochart Hot 100 at number 83 on 3 July, after charting in Belgium. It reached number one 13 weeks later, on 30 October and held the position for two weeks. "Living on My Own" earned a gold record in the Netherlands, Sweden, and the UK, while it earned a platinum record in Austria and Germany.

== Music video ==
The accompanying videos for both the original 1985 and the 1993 remix versions of "Living on My Own" show footage of Mercury's 39th birthday celebration on 5 September 1985 at the travesty nightclub Old Mrs. Henderson in Munich, where Mercury lived from 1979 to 1985. The theme of the birthday party was "A Black and White Drag Ball". Because of the garishly costumed homosexual men and transvestites celebrating a decadent raucous party in the video clip, the British broadcaster BBC long refused to broadcast the music video on its channels. The video was directed by Hannes Rossacher and Rudi Dolezal, and received heavy rotation on MTV Europe in October 1993.

== Track listings ==
=== 1985 release ===
- 7-inch

A. "Living on My Own" (single version)
B. "My Love Is Dangerous" (album version) – 3:41

- 12-inch

A. "Living on My Own" (extended version) – 6:42
B. "My Love Is Dangerous" (extended version) – 6:28

=== 1993 remix ===
- 7-inch and cassette

A. "Living on My Own" (radio mix)
B. "Living on My Own" (1992 album remix)

- 12-inch

A1. "Living on My Own" (extended mix)
A2. "Living on My Own" (club mix)
B1. "Living on My Own" (dub mix)
B2. "Living on My Own" (LA mix)

- CD single
1. "Living on My Own" (radio mix)
2. "Living on My Own" (extended mix)
3. "Living on My Own" (club mix)
4. "Living on My Own" (1992 album remix)

== Personnel ==
- Freddie Mercury – lead and backing vocals
- Colin Peter – additional production / remix
- Carl Ward – additional production / remix
- Serge Ramaekers – additional production / remix

== Charts ==
=== Weekly charts ===
Weekly chart performance for the original version
Chart (1985)	Peak position
UK Singles (Official Charts)	50

Weekly chart performance for the No More Brothers Mix
Chart (1993–1994)	Peak position
Austria (Ö3 Austria Top 40)	2
Belgium (Ultratop 50 Flanders)	2
Denmark (IFPI)	1
Europe (Eurochart Hot 100)	1
Europe (European Hit Radio)	4
Finland (Suomen virallinen lista)	6
France (SNEP)	1
Germany (GfK)	2
Greece (Pop + Rock)	1
Iceland (Íslenski Listinn Topp 40)	1
Ireland (IRMA)	1
Israel (Israeli Singles Chart)	1
Italy (Musica e dischi)	1
Netherlands (Dutch Top 40)	2
Netherlands (Single Top 100)	2
Norway (VG-lista)	1
Quebec (ADISQ)	6
Spain (AFYVE)	1
Sweden (Sverigetopplistan)	1
Switzerland (Schweizer Hitparade)	2
UK Singles (Official Charts)	1
UK Airplay (Music Week)	1
UK Dance (Music Week)	9
UK Club Chart (Music Week)	83

=== Year-end charts ===
1993 year-end chart performance for "Living on My Own"
Chart (1993)	Position
Austria (Ö3 Austria Top 40)	7
Belgium (Ultratop)	1
Europe (Eurochart Hot 100)	9
Europe (European Hit Radio)	15
Germany (Media Control)	10
Iceland (Íslenski Listinn Topp 40)	2
Israel (Israeli Singles Chart)	6
Netherlands (Dutch Top 40)	9
Netherlands (Single Top 100)	16
Sweden (Topplistan)	2
Switzerland (Schweizer Hitparade)	22
UK Singles (OCC)	20
UK Airplay (Music Week)	7

1994 year-end chart performance for "Living on My Own"
Chart (1994)	Position
Europe (Eurochart Hot 100)	65

=== Decade-end charts ===
Decade-end chart performance for "Living on My Own"
Chart (1990–1999)	Position
Austria (Ö3 Austria Top 40)	48
Belgium (Ultratop 50 Flanders)	31
Netherlands (Dutch Top 40)	88

== Sales and certifications ==
Certifications and sales for "Living on My Own"
Region	Certification	Certified units/sales
Austria (IFPI Austria)	Platinum	50,000^{*}
France (SNEP)	Silver	125,000^{*}
Germany (BVMI)	Platinum	500,000^{^}
Netherlands (NVPI)	Gold	50,000^{^}
Sweden (GLF)	Gold	25,000^{^}
United Kingdom (BPI)	Gold	400,000^{^}
^{*} Sales figures based on certification alone.^{^} Shipments figures based on certification alone.

== Release history ==
Release dates and formats for "Living on My Own"
Region	Version	Date	Format(s)	Label(s)	Ref.
United Kingdom	Original	2 September 1985	7-inch vinyl; 12-inch vinyl	CBS	
United Kingdom	No More Brothers remix	19 July 1993	7-inch vinyl; 12-inch vinyl; CD; cassette	Parlophone	
Australia	No More Brothers remix	27 September 1993	CD; cassette	Parlophone	

== See also ==
- List of posthumous number ones on the UK Singles Chart
