= Mr. Bad Guy =

Studio album by Freddie Mercury
- Released: 29 April 1985
- Recorded: Early 1983 – January 1985
- Studios: Musicland Studios, Munich, West Germany
- Genres: Synth-pop; post-disco
- Length: 40:41 (LP); 60:40 (Original UK CD)
- Label: Columbia
- Producers: Reinhold Mack; Freddie Mercury

Freddie Mercury chronology
Mr. Bad Guy (1985)	Barcelona (1988)

Singles from Mr. Bad Guy
- 1. "I Was Born to Love You" Released: 8 April 1985; 2. "Made in Heaven" Released: 1 July 1985; 3. "Living on My Own" Released: 2 September 1985; 4. "Love Me Like There's No Tomorrow" Released: 18 November 1985

Professional ratings
Review scores
Source	Rating
AllMusic	4.5/5 stars
MusicHound Rock	3/5 stars
Record Mirror	5/5 stars
Rolling Stone	(positive)
PopMatters	(positive)

This album is dedicated to my cat Jerry - also Tom, Oscar and Tiffany, and all the cat lovers across the universe - screw everybody else!

— Freddie Mercury in the albums notes

Mr. Bad Guy is the only solo studio album by British musician Freddie Mercury, lead singer of Queen. Released in 1985, during a period in which Queen were on hiatus from recording, it contains eleven songs, all written by Mercury himself.

The album was reissued on 11 October 2019, in newly remixed form, on CD, vinyl, digital and streaming services, via Mercury Records.

== Background ==
In contrast to Queen's typically rock-oriented work, Mercury and co-producer Reinhold Mack drew on disco, dance music and pop influences for Mr. Bad Guy, all of which had surfaced on Queen's previous studio album, Hot Space (1982), also produced by Mack. Mercury stated, "I had a lot of ideas bursting to get out and there were a lot of musical territories I wanted to explore which I really couldn't do within Queen." Co-producer Mack added, "he used to get pretty annoyed working with the others, because there was always Brian saying, 'It needs to be more rock 'n' roll.'" Mr. Bad Guy took nearly two years to record, as Mercury had to gather enough material together while committing to band activities.

Initially, the album was supposed to feature duets with Mercury and Michael Jackson.

We had three tracks in the can, but unfortunately they were never finished. They were great songs, but the problem was time — as we were both very busy at that period. We never seemed to be in the same country long enough to actually finish anything completely.

— Mercury in Mercury: An Intimate Biography of Freddie Mercury

However, other sources state that personal conflicts were to blame for unfinished tracks. Mercury reportedly dropped out of any further collaboration after feeling uncomfortable working with Jackson's pet llama in the studio. One track from these collaborative sessions, "There Must Be More to Life Than This", was reworked for the Mr. Bad Guy album, although the original recording featuring Jackson was eventually released on Queen Forever in 2014.

=== Production ===
Recording was taxing on Mercury, as he took part in everything from performing the tracks (including vocals, piano and synthesizer), arranging the orchestration and working with the sound engineers. Mercury's use of synthesizers and orchestration in track development added to the diversity of each piece.

The songs are not trying to be anything else but Freddie. A lot of people were expecting Freddie to be catering to the audience. He didn't want that. He just wanted the songs as they are. I didn't try to get involved in the mixing, because he may not have wanted a lot of new ideas at that stage. It was already great and I would not want to have gone in and made changes for the sake of it, like someone painting a nose on a Rembrandt portrait at the very end.

— Mack on working with Mercury

The album's original title was Made in Heaven, but Mercury changed his mind weeks before the album went to press.

Basically, I was lost for a title, but as far as I'm concerned album titles are immaterial. I didn't know what to call it, but I had what I thought was a very beautiful track called "Made in Heaven", which seemed to conjure up an image of some kind. But to be honest, I'm not really worried about it. It's what you listen to that matters, not what the title is.

— Mercury during the album's promotion

Originally released on Columbia/CBS, copyrights for Mercury Songs, a company owned by Freddie Mercury's estate, had been revoked following his death in 1991. Mr. Bad Guy would remain out of print on CD until 2000, where it was included on The Solo Collection in remastered form. Then in 2019, when it was reissued and remixed due to the commercial success of the Queen biopic Bohemian Rhapsody.

== Singles ==
Lead single "I Was Born to Love You" with the non-album B-side "Stop All the Fighting" debuted at number 50 on 14 April 1985, peaking at number 11 on 5 May 1985. It also reached number four in South Africa and number 20 on 1 June in Austria. "Made in Heaven" peaked at number 57 on the UK Singles Chart on 21 July 1985 and charted for four weeks. "Living on My Own" charted at number 50 in the United Kingdom, while the fourth and final single, "Love Me Like There's No Tomorrow," debuted and peaked at number 76 on the UK chart on 24 November 1985.

=== Re-worked singles ===
"Living on My Own" was re-released in 1993 (almost two years after Mercury's death) in a remixed form by No More Brothers. The single reached number one in the UK, becoming his most successful solo single release, albeit posthumously. "I Was Born to Love You" became Mercury's only solo chart success in Australia, reaching number 13. That song, and "Made in Heaven", were later reworked by the three surviving Queen members and included on the 1995 studio album Made in Heaven.

== Track listing ==
All tracks are written by Freddie Mercury.

Side one
No.	Title	Length
1.	"Let's Turn It On"	3:42
2.	"Made in Heaven"	4:05
3.	"I Was Born to Love You"	3:38
4.	"Foolin' Around"	3:29
5.	"Your Kind of Lover"	3:32

Side two
No.	Title	Length
6.	"Mr. Bad Guy"	4:09
7.	"Man Made Paradise"	4:08
8.	"There Must Be More to Life Than This"	3:00
9.	"Living on My Own"	3:23
10.	"My Love Is Dangerous"	3:42
11.	"Love Me Like There's No Tomorrow"	3:46
Total length:		40:41

UK CD bonus tracks
No.	Title	Length
12.	"Let's Turn It On" (12" version)	5:06
13.	"I Was Born to Love You" (12" version)	7:03
14.	"Living on My Own" (12" version)	6:40
Total length:		60:40

== Personnel ==
The following personnel are credited in the liner notes.

- Freddie Mercury – vocals, piano, synthesizer
- Fred Mandel – additional piano, synthesizer, rhythm guitar
- Paul Vincent – lead guitar
- Curt Cress – drums
- Stephan Wissnet – bass guitar
- Jo Burt – bass guitar on "Man Made Paradise"
- Mack and Stephan Wissnet – programming
- Rainer Pietsch – orchestral arrangements

Technical

- Mack, assisted by Stephan Wissnet – engineering
- The Artful Dodger – cover art
- Andrzej Sawa – photograph

== Charts ==
=== Weekly charts ===
Chart (1985)	Peak position
Australian Albums (Kent Music Report)	38
Austrian Albums (Ö3 Austria)	23
Canada Top Albums/CDs (RPM)	92
Dutch Albums (Album Top 100)	17
German Albums (Offizielle Top 100)	11
Norwegian Albums (VG-lista)	13
Swedish Albums (Sverigetopplistan)	20
Swiss Albums (Schweizer Hitparade)	14
UK Albums (Official Charts)	6
US Billboard 200	159

Chart (2019)	Peak position
Belgian Albums (Ultratop Wallonia)	134
Scottish Albums (Official Charts)	18
Spanish Albums (Promusicae)	23
UK Albums (Official Charts)	87

Chart (2025)	Peak position
Dutch Vinyl Albums (Dutch Charts) 40th Anniversary edition	19
German Rock & Metal Albums (Offizielle Top 100)	13

=== Year-end charts ===
Chart (1985)	Peak position
German Albums (Offizielle Top 100)	57

== Certifications ==
Region	Certification	Certified units/sales
United Kingdom (BPI)	Gold	100,000^{^}
^{^} Shipments figures based on certification alone.
