= The Great Pretender =

1955 song recorded by The Platters

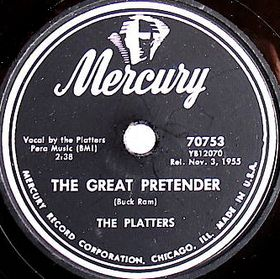

Single by The Platters

from the album Encore of Golden Hits
- B-side: "I'm Just a Dancing Partner"
- Released: November 3, 1955
- Recorded: 1955
- Genre: Rhythm and blues, doo-wop
- Length: 2:36
- Label: Mercury
- Songwriter: Buck Ram
- Producer: Buck Ram

The Platters singles chronology
"Only You (And You Alone)" (1955)	"The Great Pretender" (1955)	"I Need You All the Time" (1955)

"The Great Pretender" is a doo-wop song recorded by American band The Platters and released in November 1955. It was written and composed by Buck Ram, the group's manager and producer who was earlier a successful songwriter; lead vocals are by Tony Williams. The song reached No. 2 on Billboard's Top 100, and No. 5 on the UK charts.

The song has been covered by a number of singers, including Roy Orbison and Dolly Parton. Freddie Mercury's version reached No. 4 on the UK charts. Sam Cooke's cover of the song is believed to have inspired Chrissie Hynde to name her band The Pretenders. A parody version was recorded by American radio comedian Stan Freberg in 1956.

== Platters' original ==
Buck Ram, the manager of the Platters, said that he wrote the song in about 20 minutes in the washroom of the Flamingo Hotel, in order to have a follow-up to the success of "Only You (And You Alone)". Ram had boasted to Bob Shad that he had an even better song than "Only You" and, when pressed by Shad on the name of the song, Ram quickly replied, "The Great Pretender". He said the song would be a hit even before he had written it to go with the title. The song was recorded by the Platters and released in November 1955. Plas Johnson played tenor saxophone on the recording. It became the best-selling R&B song in January 1956, and reached No. 2 on the Top 100 chart on Billboard in February 1956. It was also the 12th-best-selling singles of 1956.

The Platters performed "The Great Pretender" and "Only You" in the 1956 musical film Rock Around the Clock, and the song was also used in the film American Graffiti.

In 2002, "The Great Pretender" by the Platters on Mercury Records was inducted into the Grammy Hall of Fame, which lists the date as 1956.

In 2004, the song was ranked 360th in Rolling Stone's 500 Greatest Songs of All Time.

=== Charts ===
Weekly chart performance for "The Great Pretender"
Chart (1956–1957)	Peak position
Belgium (Ultratop 50 Flanders)	5
Belgium (Ultratop 50 Wallonia)	3
Netherlands (Single Top 100)	1
UK Singles (Official Charts)	5
US R&B Records (Billboard)	1
US Billboard Top 100	1

== Freddie Mercury's version ==
"The Great Pretender"

Single by Freddie Mercury
- B-side: "Exercises in Free Love" (3:58)
- Released: February 23, 1987; January 25, 1993 (reissue)
- Recorded: January 1987
- Genre: Pop
- Length: 3:25 (7" version): 5:55 (12" extended version)
- Label: Mercury
- Songwriter: Buck Ram
- Producers: David Richards; Freddie Mercury; Mike Moran

Freddie Mercury singles chronology
"Time" (1986)	"The Great Pretender" (1987)	"Barcelona" (1987)

1992 reissue
- Cover of 1992 US album release

Music video
- "The Great Pretender" on YouTube

The song was repopularized in 1987 by Freddie Mercury, the lead singer of the rock band Queen. Mercury's version reached No. 4 in the UK Singles Chart. In one of his last videotaped interviews in spring of 1987, Mercury explained that the song was particularly fitting for the way he saw his career and being on stage.

Mercury's original music video for the song featured him parodying himself in many of his Queen guises over the years, including visual re-takes of "Radio Ga Ga", "Crazy Little Thing Called Love", "It's a Hard Life", "I Want to Break Free", "Bohemian Rhapsody", "I Was Born to Love You", and "Made in Heaven". It was directed by David Mallet in February 1987, and also featured fellow Queen member Roger Taylor and actor Peter Straker in drag. The video was also notable for Mercury having shaved off his moustache, which he had sported for much of the 1980s. In 1992, Brian Malouf remixed the song for the film Night and the City, and a new edit of the video was produced using clips from the film.

Wit Studio's original anime television series Great Pretender uses this version as its ending theme.

=== Personnel ===
- Freddie Mercury: lead vocals and backing vocals
- Mike Moran: synthesizers
- Alan Jones: bass
- Harold Fisher: drums

=== Charts ===
==== Weekly charts ====
Weekly chart performance for Freddie Mercury's cover
Chart (1987–1993)	Peak position
Australia (Kent Music Report)	54
Austria (Ö3 Austria Top 40)	26
Belgium (Ultratop 50 Flanders)	6
Finland (Suomen virallinen lista)	7
France (SNEP)	13
Ireland (IRMA)	2
Italy Airplay (Music & Media)	19
Netherlands (Dutch Top 40)	9
Netherlands (Single Top 100)	11
New Zealand (Recorded Music NZ)	5
Portugal (AFYVE)	3
Sweden (Sverigetopplistan)	14
Switzerland (Schweizer Hitparade)	15
UK Singles (Official Charts)	4
West Germany (GfK)	26

==== Year-end charts ====
1987 year-end chart for Freddie Mercury's cover
Chart (1987)	Position
Belgium (Ultratop 50 Flanders)	69
European Top 100 Singles (Music & Media)	96
UK Singles (Gallup)	39

== Jimmy Parkinson's versions ==
The song was covered in the UK by Australian vocalist Jimmy Parkinson. It entered the Top 20 on March 3, 1956, six months before the Platters' version; Parkinson's version peaked at No. 9 and remained in the Top 20 for ten weeks.
