= Reinhold Mack =

German music producer

- Born: 25 August 1949 (age 77); West Germany
- Occupation: Record producer

Reinhold Mack (born 25 August 1949), sometimes credited mononymously as Mack, is a German record producer and engineer. He is best known for his collaborations with Billy Squier, Queen, the Electric Light Orchestra, Sparks, and Chinaski.

== Biography ==
=== Early life and education ===
Mack grew up in Munich, West Germany, and was classically trained on piano, clarinet and acoustic guitar. At the age of fourteen, he discovered the electric guitar, playing in cover bands before being drafted into the West German Army. When Mack came home following his military service, he learned that his parents had gotten rid of his music equipment, and he decided to seek work at a recording studio.

=== Career ===
In 1970, Mack began working at Union Studios in Munich, recording commercials and oom-pah music before advancing to work with more notable artists such as Ivan Rebroff, Peter Alexander and Amon Düül. While at Union Studios, Mack was approached by Giorgio Moroder to mix a song for Scottish singer Lulu and, pleased with the results, asked Mack to come work for him full-time in his small 16-track recording studio in the basement of the 23-story Arabella Hochhaus hotel/apartment building. With Mack's help, Moroder's studio would expand to become Musicland Studios.

At Musicland's first session in 1973, Mack assisted producer Tony Visconti in recording sessions for Marc Bolan and T. Rex for their album Zinc Alloy and the Hidden Riders of Tomorrow, and later assisted on the Rolling Stones' It's Only Rock 'n Roll and Black and Blue, Deep Purple's Stormbringer and Come Taste the Band, and Led Zeppelin's Presence.

Mack first worked with Electric Light Orchestra in 1975 while engineering during recording sessions for Face the Music, the start of a working relationship that would span six years and the band's next five studio albums. Mack also worked with Queen and Sparks, with the Queen album The Game garnering Mack and the band a Grammy Award nomination for Producer of the Year in 1981.

In 1998, Mack founded Nightjar, a company originally focused on producing and remastering music for surround sound formats. In 1999, he transferred the company, which now produces content for multimedia, video, animation, and sound, to his sons Julian and Felix.

== Legacy ==
Mack and wife Ingrid's third son, John Frederick Mack, was named after Freddie Mercury and was a godson of both Mercury and Queen bassist John Deacon.

Mack is referenced in the lyrics of the Queen song "Dragon Attack" on their 1980 album The Game, which he produced with the band: "gonna use my stack/it's gotta be Mack".

== Selected discography ==
Albums worked on as sound engineer:

- Czesław Niemen (SBB): Strange Is This World (1972)
- Czesław Niemen (SBB): Ode to Venus (1973)
- Amos Key: First Key (1973)
- T. Rex: Zinc Alloy and the Hidden Riders of Tomorrow (1974)
- Deep Purple: Stormbringer (1974)
- Deep Purple: Come Taste the Band (1975)
- Electric Light Orchestra: Face the Music (1975)
- Electric Light Orchestra: A New World Record (1976)
- Sweet: Give Us a Wink! (1976)
- Electric Light Orchestra: Out of the Blue (1977)
- Electric Light Orchestra: Discovery (1979)
- Electric Light Orchestra: Xanadu (1980)
- Electric Light Orchestra: Time (1981)
- Brian May & Friends: Star Fleet Project (1983, Mini Album; mixed by Mack)
- Electric Light Orchestra: Balance of Power (1986)
- Queen: Live Magic (1986; recorded by Mack and David Richards)
- Queen: Live at Wembley '86 (1992; recorded by Mack)
- Queen: Queen on Fire – Live at the Bowl (2004; recorded by Mack)
- Queen: Queen Rock Montreal (2007; recorded by Mack)
- Rainbow: Rising (1976)
- Gordian: Madeka (2016)

Albums produced or co-produced by Mack:

- Scorpions: Fly to the Rainbow (1974)
- The Rolling Stones: It's Only Rock 'n Roll (1974)
- Deep Purple: Come Taste the Band (1975)
- Rory Gallagher: Calling Card (1976)
- The Rolling Stones: Black and Blue (1976)
- David Coverdale: White Snake (1977)
- Peter Straker: Real Natural Man (1980)
- Queen: The Game (1980)
- Queen: Flash Gordon (1980)
- After the Fire: 80-f (1980)
- Sparks: Whomp That Sucker (1981)
- Billy Squier: Don't Say No (1981)
- After the Fire: Batteries Not Included (1982)
- Sparks: Angst in My Pants (1982)
- Queen: Hot Space (1982)
- Billy Squier: Emotions in Motion (1982)
- Doc Holliday: Modern Medicine (1983)
- Queen: The Works (1984)
- Roger Taylor: Strange Frontier (1984)
- Meat Loaf: Bad Attitude (1984; produced by Meat Loaf, Paul Jacobs and Mack)
- Freddie Mercury: Mr. Bad Guy (1985)
- BAP: Ahl Männer, aalglatt (1986)
- Queen: A Kind of Magic (1986)
- Extrabreit (German band): Sex after three years in a submarine (1987)
- Heavy Pettin: Lettin Loose (1987; produced by Brian May and Mack)
- Michael White: Michael White (1987)
- Extreme: Extreme (1989)
- It Bites: Eat Me in St. Louis (1989)
- Bonfire: Knock Out (1991)
- Law and Order: Rites of Passage (1991)
- Black Sabbath: Dehumanizer (1992)
- Loud: Psyche 21 (1992)
- SBB: New Century (2005)
- Julian Mack: Have you no decency (2005)
- Liquid Meat: Beat the Meatles (2006)
- The Shazam: M3TEOR (2009)
- Liquid Meat: Maximum Carnage (2009)
- Big Wood: Big Wood (2012)
- Custard: Infested by Anger (2012)
- Symphonika: In Dreams (2013)
- SBB: Za linią horyzontu (Behind the Line of Horizon) (2016)
- Chinaski: 11 (produced by Mack and Sacha Skarbek) (2019)
