= Mary Austin (heiress) =

Partner and heir of Freddie Mercury (born 1951)

- Born: Mary G. Austin; 1951 (age 74–75); Fulham, London, England, United Kingdom
- Occupation: Author
- Known for: Partner and principal heir of Freddie Mercury
- Children: 2

Mary Austin (born 1951) is a British author and the principal heir of the singer Freddie Mercury. She was his partner, later his personal assistant, and remained his closest friend until his death in 1991.

Austin inherited half of Mercury's estate along with his Kensington house, Garden Lodge, where she lived for more than 30 years, and she has never disclosed where his ashes lie. In 2023 she sold his personal collection at auction for £39.9 million, the highest total recorded for a celebrity sale, and in 2026 she published A Life in Lyrics, drawn from his manuscript archive.

== Early life ==
Mary Austin was born in 1951 in the United Kingdom. Both of her parents were deaf, and the family had little money: her mother worked as a cleaner and her father in a factory. Her mother died when Austin was 15, after which she helped raise her younger sisters.

She worked as a sales assistant at Biba, a fashion boutique in Kensington, London, where she later became a manager.

== Relationship with Freddie Mercury ==
=== Meeting and living together ===
Austin met Freddie Mercury in 1970 through Brian May, a friend of hers at the time. She was at May's house on the day he, Mercury and Roger Taylor were discussing possible names for their new band, May suggesting Build Your Own Boat and Mercury Queen. Her first impression was of a man whose confidence she found intimidating.

They soon became close, and after four months Mercury suggested they move in together. The decision was partly a financial one, as he wanted to live in London but could not afford to do so alone. They moved in together in 1971 and shared the rent. Austin has attributed their bond to their similarly difficult childhoods, Mercury having been sent at the age of seven to a British boarding school near Bombay, seeing his parents only once over the following seven years.

=== Engagement and separation ===
The couple became engaged in 1973. In her book, Austin dates to early 1977 the moment Mercury told her he believed he was bisexual, to which she replied that she thought he was gay. He did not disagree. She has described the conversation as a relief rather than a break, having understood some time earlier that he did not intend to marry her. They continued to live together for a further 18 months, and remained close until his death.

Mercury spoke publicly about their bond during his lifetime. He referred to her as his common-law wife.

=== Personal assistant ===
Austin became Mercury's personal assistant, describing herself as his "girl Friday". She also acted as an intermediary in the singer's turbulent relationships, notably with the manager David Minns.

In 1985, Austin pressed Mercury to take part in Live Aid, which he was reluctant to do. According to her book, he withdrew from her, they fell out, and he stopped speaking to her in the days before the concert. Queen performed nonetheless, in a set that revived the band's popularity. Rather than watching from the side of the stage as she usually did, Austin bought her own tickets and watched from the crowd.

=== Mercury's illness and death ===
In 1986, Mercury learned that he was HIV-positive, and his doctors confirmed six months later that the condition had progressed to AIDS. He kept this secret, telling only his partner Jim Hutton, Queen's manager Jim Beach and Austin.

Two years before the singer's death, Austin gave birth to her first son, Richard, by her partner at the time. Mercury became the boy's godfather but avoided all physical contact with him, as little was then known about the virus. Austin was pregnant with her second son, Jamie, when Mercury died, and separated from their father before the birth.

She has described sustained press harassment in Mercury's final weeks, with photographers stationed outside the house and following him to medical appointments, to the point that he had to use decoys to leave. Austin herself was targeted, with the tabloid press claiming she had AIDS, at a time when Margaret Thatcher's government was introducing testing for pregnant women.

Austin was at his bedside when he died on 24 November 1991. She has said that she was holding his hand as he drifted in and out of consciousness under morphine, and that his last words to her were "my old faithful".

== Inheritance and executor ==
=== Funeral ===
Mercury was cremated at Kensal Green in 1991, at a service conducted by a Zoroastrian priest in keeping with his family's Parsi traditions. Austin then took the urn and placed the ashes at a location she has never disclosed, including to the singer's parents and sister, saying that she was honouring his wishes.

She has said that she apologised to the family without being able to tell them more, and that Mercury's mother came to accept this.

=== Will and Garden Lodge ===
Several years before his death, Mercury told Austin that she would inherit his house, Garden Lodge, along with half of his fortune and future earnings. She has said that she initially refused the house, and that the singer replied that had things gone to plan she would have been his wife and the property would have been hers by right. She eventually accepted, feeling it was her duty to do so.

Under the will, Austin received the Kensington house and 50 per cent of the estate, then valued at £37.5 million, including future royalties. Mercury's sister, Kashmira Bulsara, received 25 per cent, as did his parents.

The British press has reported that Austin's share rose to 75 per cent after the death of Mercury's parents. She subsequently denied this.

Jim Hutton, Mercury's partner in his final years, was left £500,000 but was required to leave Garden Lodge within three months so that Austin could move in. He later said the singer had told him he could stay on, and resented her for it. Austin has said the decision was made by the executors, not by her.

=== Feud with Kashmira Bulsara ===
Relations between Austin and Kashmira Bulsara, Mercury's younger sister, have been lastingly strained. The biographer Lesley-Ann Jones traces the animosity to the reading of the will, Mercury having left the bulk of his estate to Austin rather than to his family. Austin's refusal to reveal where the ashes lie has added to the tension.

The disagreement also concerns the dispersal of the singer's belongings, Bulsara opposing the sale of both his possessions and the house.

Austin has said she offered Bulsara the chance to choose items before the 2023 sale. She has said she does not know whether Bulsara bought pieces anonymously, and that she hopes their relationship will improve.

== Sale of the collection ==
Having lived at Garden Lodge for more than 30 years, Austin decided in 2022 to put Mercury's belongings in order so as not to leave the burden to her sons. With them she went through rooms that had been left untouched, finding notes, drafts and scores that had never been published.

In early 2023, representatives from Sotheby's visited Garden Lodge and took a particular interest in the singer's handwritten lyrics. After they left, Austin and her younger son continued searching and opened the piano stool, which held cassette tapes along with the manuscript lyrics to several Queen songs, among them "We Are the Champions", "Somebody to Love" and "Don't Stop Me Now".

Austin announced the sale in April 2023, explaining that she wanted to put her affairs in order and close this chapter of her life. She said she had chosen to keep nothing back apart from a few personal gifts and photographs.

Titled Freddie Mercury: A World of His Own, the sale took place in September 2023 across six auctions. The exhibition that preceded it drew more than 140,000 visitors. All 1,406 lots found buyers, for a total of £39.9 million, far above the £7.6 million to £11.3 million Sotheby's had forecast; the auction house described it as the highest total ever achieved for a celebrity sale. Austin gave part of the proceeds to the Mercury Phoenix Trust, of which she is a trustee, and the Elton John AIDS Foundation.

Writing in The Art Newspaper, Scott Reyburn questioned how comprehensively the sale had succeeded. Mercury's Yamaha baby grand piano, the star lot, was offered without reserve at the last minute; a Sotheby's spokesperson said Austin had asked for the reserve to be removed in order to open the bidding to a broader base of buyers, and she said she wanted the instrument to go to a home where it would be loved and enjoyed. It sold for £1.4 million, slightly more than £1.7 million with fees, below its £2 million low estimate. A painting that attracted no bids was offered again at the end of the auction and sold below its low estimate, after which Sotheby's reported that every lot had sold.

Kashmira Bulsara bought around £3 million worth of items at the sale, bidding through an intermediary to remain anonymous. They included a Wurlitzer jukebox, a waistcoat painted with Mercury's cats, a military-style jacket made for his 39th birthday, and draft lyrics to "Killer Queen".

In 2024, Austin put Garden Lodge on the market for £30 million. The house remained unsold in early 2026.

== A Life in Lyrics ==
From 2022, Austin spent four years preparing a book drawn from the documents found at Garden Lodge. Published on 1 September 2026, a few days before what would have been Mercury's 80th birthday, A Life in Lyrics was issued by HarperCollins in the United Kingdom and by Dey Street Books in the United States.

The book brings together manuscript lyrics, drawings, photographs and facsimiles of scores, with Austin's commentary on how the songs came about and on her relationship with the singer. It carries two names, Mercury's and her own.

Austin writes that she wanted to honour the man she knew as Freddie Bulsara rather than the public figure, and to show the compositional work behind the songs. Forbes noted that the book avoids intimate revelations and concentrates on the singer's creative life. Le Monde observed that although the book carries her name, Austin herself is strikingly absent from it, the account being given over entirely to Mercury.

== Personal life and public image ==
Austin has two sons, Richard and Jamie, by the painter Piers Cameron. She married Nicholas Holford in 1998 and they divorced in 2002.

For many years she did not tell her sons about the nature of her relationship with Mercury, fearing they would face the stigma he had been subjected to. Jamie has said he always knew his mother had been close to Mercury but avoided the subject because of the distress it caused her, and that he only understood the scale of the inheritance during the discussions that preceded the 2023 sale.

Austin has rarely spoken publicly since Mercury's death. She describes herself as a loner with no circle of friends, unlike the singer.

Several publications have described Austin as the inspiration for the 1975 song "Love of My Life". She denied this in 2026, saying Mercury had never told her the song was about her and had instead written "Lily of the Valley" about her.

The 2018 film Bohemian Rhapsody, in which she is played by Lucy Boynton, gives her a central role. In 2026 she said she had not seen the film and did not want to, having lived through the events and not wishing to see someone else's version of them.

In 2025, Lesley-Ann Jones's biography Love, Freddie reported the account of a woman known only as B, who claimed to be Mercury's daughter, born of an affair with a friend's wife. Austin disputed the claim in The Sunday Times, saying she had never known of any child and that she thought it implausible the singer could have kept such a secret. The woman died in January 2026.

== Works ==
- A Life in Lyrics: The Official Creative Legacy of Freddie Mercury. HarperCollins. 2026.
