= The Stone Age: Sixty Years of the Rolling Stones =

- Author: Lesley-Ann Jones
- Language: British English
- Subjects: The Rolling Stones, Mick Jagger, Brian Jones, Keith Richards, Bill Wyman, Ronnie Wood, Mick Taylor, Charlie Watts, Anita Pallenberg, Bianca Jagger, David Bowie, Jerry Hall, Marianne Faithfull
- Genre: non-fiction
- Published: 4th Floor, Victoria House
- Publisher: John Blake Publishing; Pegasus Books
- Publication date: 2 Augusti 2022
- Publication place: United Kingdom
- Pages: 386
- ISBN: 978-1639362073

The Stone Age: Sixty Years of the Rolling Stones is a 2022 non-fiction book about the history of the English rock band The Rolling Stones written by Lesley-Ann Jones.

== Publication history ==
It was Jones' intent with the book to convey a woman's perspective on The Rolling Stones, something she feels has been lacking in most earlier biographies of the band.

== Content ==
The book claims that band members Keith Richards, Brian Jones, Mick Jagger and Mick Taylor were bisexual and that Jagger had flings with each of the other three, as well as a long-term affair with singer David Bowie. Jones argues in the book that Jagger should be reassessed as a bisexual icon.

== Reception ==
Publishers Weekly called the book "more shallow than substantive". Kenneth Womack of Salon referred to it as a "no-holds-barred study" that is strange and "occasionally beguiling". Adam Ellsworth of The Arts Fuse gave the book a mixed review, commenting that it consists mostly of gossip, but praised the amount of coverage of the women in the band's orbit. John Walshe of the Business Post gave the book a positive review, stating that Jones personal experience with some of the events adds to her ability to tell the story of the band well. Vintage Guitar magazine's Bret Adams commends that Jones "brings a befitting wit, sarcasm, and snark" to the text. Jennie Roberson of Bi.org (Note: A part of the American Institute of Bisexuality.) lauded Jones effort in backing up claims for the book, calling it "exhaustively well-researched". David Keymer's review in the Library Journal was negative. Keymer feels that the book is "overhyped" and paints an unattractive picture of the band, but that it will likely be popular with readers regardless because the subject mater is fascinating. OK! magazine found the book to be a "mind-blowing expose". Kirkus Reviews summarised the book as "a feast for those looking for Rolling Stones gossip, but the author’s evident dislike for the band leaves a sour taste".

== See also ==
- Jagger: Rebel, Rock Star, Rambler, Rogue
- The Rolling Stones: An Illustrated Record
