= Anita Pallenberg =

German actress, artist and model (1942–2017)

- Pallenberg in 1965
- Born: 6 April 1942; Rome, Italy or Hamburg, Germany
- Died: 13 June 2017 (aged 75); Worthing, West Sussex, England
- Occupations: Actress, artist, model
- Partners: Brian Jones (1965–1967); Keith Richards (1967–1980)
- Children: 3

Anita Pallenberg (6 April 1942 – 13 June 2017) was an Italian-German film actress, artist, and model. A style icon and "It girl" of the 1960s and 1970s, Pallenberg was credited as the muse of the Rolling Stones: she was the romantic partner of the Stones multi-instrumentalist Brian Jones and later, from 1967 to 1980, the partner of Stones guitarist Keith Richards, with whom she had three children.

== Early life ==
Pallenberg was born on 6 April 1942 in Rome, according to most sources. However, after her death in 2017, several news sources such as the New York Times reported that Marlon Richards had corrected her place of birth, stating that his mother had in fact been born in Hamburg. Her parents were Arnold "Arnaldo" Pallenberg, a German-Italian sales agent, amateur singer, and hobbyist painter, and Paula Wiederhold, a German embassy secretary.

The family was separated because of World War II, and Pallenberg did not see her father until she was three years old. Her father, a descendant of the Pallenberg family dynasty from Cologne, who were renowned as furniture manufacturers and patrons of the arts, later sent her to a boarding school in Germany so that she would learn the language. She became fluent in four languages at an early age.

Pallenberg was expelled from school when she was 16, after which she spent time in Rome with the Dolce Vita crowd, and then went to New York City to hang out at Andy Warhol's The Factory. She then began her career as a fashion model in Paris. She studied medicine, picture restoration and graphic design without ever completing a degree. Before settling in London, she had lived in Germany and Rome, as well as in New York City, where she was active in the Living Theatre, starring in the play Paradise Now, which featured onstage nudity, and Andy Warhol's Factory.

== Film and fashion ==
Pallenberg appeared in over a dozen films over a 40-year span. One of her first appearances was as the Great Tyrant in Roger Vadim's science fiction film Barbarella (1968); however, the character's actual voice was dubbed by Joan Greenwood. She played the sleeper wife of Michel Piccoli in Dillinger Is Dead (1969), directed by Marco Ferreri. Pallenberg also had roles in the German crime thriller A Degree of Murder (1967), which featured music composed by Brian Jones; the cult film Candy (1968) as James Coburn's possessive nurse; Volker Schlöndorff's Michael Kohlhaas – Der Rebell (1969), which was filmed in Slovakia; and the avant-garde Performance (1970), in which she played the role of Pherber. Performance was shot in 1968, but a nervous studio delayed its release.

Pallenberg appeared in a documentary about the Rolling Stones, Sympathy for the Devil (1968), directed by French filmmaker Jean-Luc Godard. In an interview she gave The Independent, which published it on 16 March 2007, she related her encounters in Rome while La Dolce Vita (1960) was being filmed, with its director Federico Fellini, other filmmakers such as Luchino Visconti and Pier Paolo Pasolini, and with the novelist Alberto Moravia.

In 1985, for the video of "Wild Boys," Duran Duran used a clip of Pallenberg from Barbarella. She portrayed "The Queen" in the comedy-drama Mister Lonely by Harmony Korine, and played a character named Sin in Go Go Tales (both 2007).

In the 1990s, Pallenberg returned to education to study fashion. She graduated from Central Saint Martins in London in 1994 with a fashion and textile degree. However, she decided not to forge ahead with a career in fashion, finding it too cutthroat and cruel.

Pallenberg has been portrayed several times by other performers. Monet Mazur played a young Pallenberg in the film Stoned (2005), a biographical film about the last year of Brian Jones's life, while the NBC television show Studio 60 on the Sunset Strip (2006) included a story arc in which the character Harriet Hayes was hired to play Pallenberg in a film.

== The Rolling Stones ==
=== Romantic relationships ===
Pallenberg is known for her romantic involvement with Rolling Stones band members Brian Jones and later Keith Richards. Pallenberg first met the band in 1965 in Munich, where she was working on a modelling assignment. Jones spoke German and they began a friendship that turned into a two-year relationship. She later recalled that they took a lot of acid during this time, and it caused Jones to have nightmares. She ended her relationship with Jones in 1967 after he became violent toward her during a vacation in Morocco, where he was then hospitalised. He died in 1969.

In Morocco, Keith Richards saw Jones assaulting Pallenberg, pulled her away and then took her back to England, where she moved in with him. In 1981, Richards stated that he still loved Pallenberg, although he had already met his future wife, Patti Hansen.

There were rumours that Pallenberg also had a brief affair with Mick Jagger during the filming of Performance and Keith Richards states in his autobiography Life that it happened. Pallenberg denied further affairs, both in March 2007 when Performance was released on DVD and again during an interview in 2008.

=== Influence on the Rolling Stones ===
Pallenberg's burgeoning relationship with Jones encouraged him to experiment musically in their 1966 album Aftermath, while her intelligence and sophistication both intimidated and elicited envy from the other Stones. Pallenberg played an unusual role in the male-dominated world of rock music in the late 1960s, with Jagger respecting her opinion enough for tracks on Beggars Banquet to be remixed after she criticised them. In the 2002 compilation release of Forty Licks, Pallenberg is credited as singing background vocals on "Sympathy for the Devil".

Tony Sanchez's account of his time as Richards's bodyguard and drug dealer mentions Pallenberg's spiritual practices: "She was obsessed with black magic and began to carry a string of garlic with her everywhere—even to bed." Sanchez goes on to describe Pallenberg as having been "like a life-force, a woman so powerful, so full of strength and determination that men came to lean on her".

Jo Bergman, who was the band's personal assistant from 1967 to 1973, said of Pallenberg: "Anita is a Rolling Stone. She, Mick, Keith and Brian were the Rolling Stones. Her influence has been profound. She keeps things crazy."

In the 1977 Toronto heroin arrest, Pallenberg pled guilty to marijuana possession and was convicted and fined several weeks after Richards' arrest.

Pallenberg was a friend of singer Marianne Faithfull, Jagger's girlfriend in the late 1960s. They appeared together in the fourth series (2001) of the BBC sitcom Absolutely Fabulous in episode four, "Donkey", with Faithfull playing God and Pallenberg the Devil.

=== Death of Scott Cantrell ===
On 20 July 1979, 17-year-old Scott Cantrell shot himself in the head in Pallenberg's bed with a gun owned by Keith Richards, while at the South Salem, New York, house shared by Richards and Pallenberg. The youth had been employed as a part-time groundsman. Richards was in Paris recording with the Rolling Stones and Pallenberg was arrested; however, the death was ruled a suicide in 1980.

== Personal life ==
Pallenberg and Richards had three children: son Marlon Leon Sundeep (born 10 August 1969), daughter Dandelion Angela (who goes by her middle name; born 17 April 1972), and son Tara Jo Jo Gunne (born 26 March 1976 – 6 June 1976). Tara Jo Jo died in his cot ten weeks after birth; the cause of death has been stated as SIDS or pneumonia.

Pallenberg first became pregnant in 1968, but since she had already signed on to be part of the film Performance she felt that she was pressured to have an abortion, which caused her to feel extremely resentful. She became pregnant again, with Marlon, during the filming.

After Tara Jo Jo's death, Keith's mother blamed Pallenberg and said she was an unfit mother, and took Angela to live with her. Pallenberg raised Marlon mostly on the road with the band. When Marlon was eight, she moved into a house on Long Island, New York, so he could have a more routine life and go to school. In later years, she lived principally in Chelsea, London, spending winters in Jamaica.

There have been claims that Pallenberg married a man named Gabriel Roux in 1982, but Lesley-Ann Jones was unable to find any confirmation for this when writing her book The Stone Age: Sixty Years of the Rolling Stones.

At one point, Pallenberg expressed interest in writing a memoir, but ultimately decided not to pursue the venture. "The publishers want to hear only about the Stones and more dirt on Mick Jagger and I'm just not interested", she said in 2008. "I had several publishers and they were all the same. They all wanted salacious. And everybody is writing autobiographies and that's one reason why I'm not going to do it. If young Posh Spice can write her autobiography, then I don't want to write one!" However, an unpublished memoir, together with taped interviews, was discovered by her grandchildren after her death, becoming a main ingredient of the documentary film Catching Fire. In the film, she speaks about her family, saying that her father was a classical musician and her great grandfather was the painter Arnold Böcklin.

=== Health problems ===
Pallenberg suffered from hepatitis C, and had two hip surgeries, including a hip replacement, which caused her to walk with a limp. After detoxing in the early 1980s, Pallenberg abstained from drug use but later had a relapse. In 2014, she said she had been 14 years sober from drugs. She stopped drinking in 1987, but had a relapse with alcohol in 2004 after her second hip surgery. She regularly attended AA meetings. In August 2016, she told Alain Elkann in an interview when asked about growing old, "I am ready to die. I have done so much here. My Mum died at 94. I don't want to lose my independence. Now I am over 70 and to be honest I did not think I would live over 40".

== Death ==
Pallenberg died on 13 June 2017, aged 75, due to complications from hepatitis C. She is survived by her two children and five grandchildren.

== Legacy ==
Pallenberg is the subject of the 2024 documentary film Catching Fire: The Story of Anita Pallenberg.

== Filmography ==
- A Degree of Murder (Mord und Totschlag, 1967) as Marie
- Wonderwall (1968) as Girl at Party (uncredited)
- Barbarella (1968) as The Great Tyrant
- Candy (1968) as Nurse Bullock
- Dillinger Is Dead (Dillinger è morto, 1969) as Ginette
- Michael Kohlhaas – Der Rebell (1969) as Katrina – Marketenderin
- Performance (1970) as Pherber
- Umano non umano (1972, Documentary)
- Le berceau de cristal (The Crystal Cradle) (1976)
- Love Is the Devil: Study for a Portrait of Francis Bacon (1998) as Casino
- Absolutely Fabulous (2001, Episode: "Donkey") as Devil
- Mister Lonely (2007) as The Queen
- Go Go Tales (2007) as Sin
- Cheri (2009) as La Copine
- Stones in Exile (2010, Documentary) as Herself
- 4:44 Last Day on Earth (2011) as Sky's Mother (final film role)
