= Garden Lodge, Kensington =

Last residence of Freddie Mercury

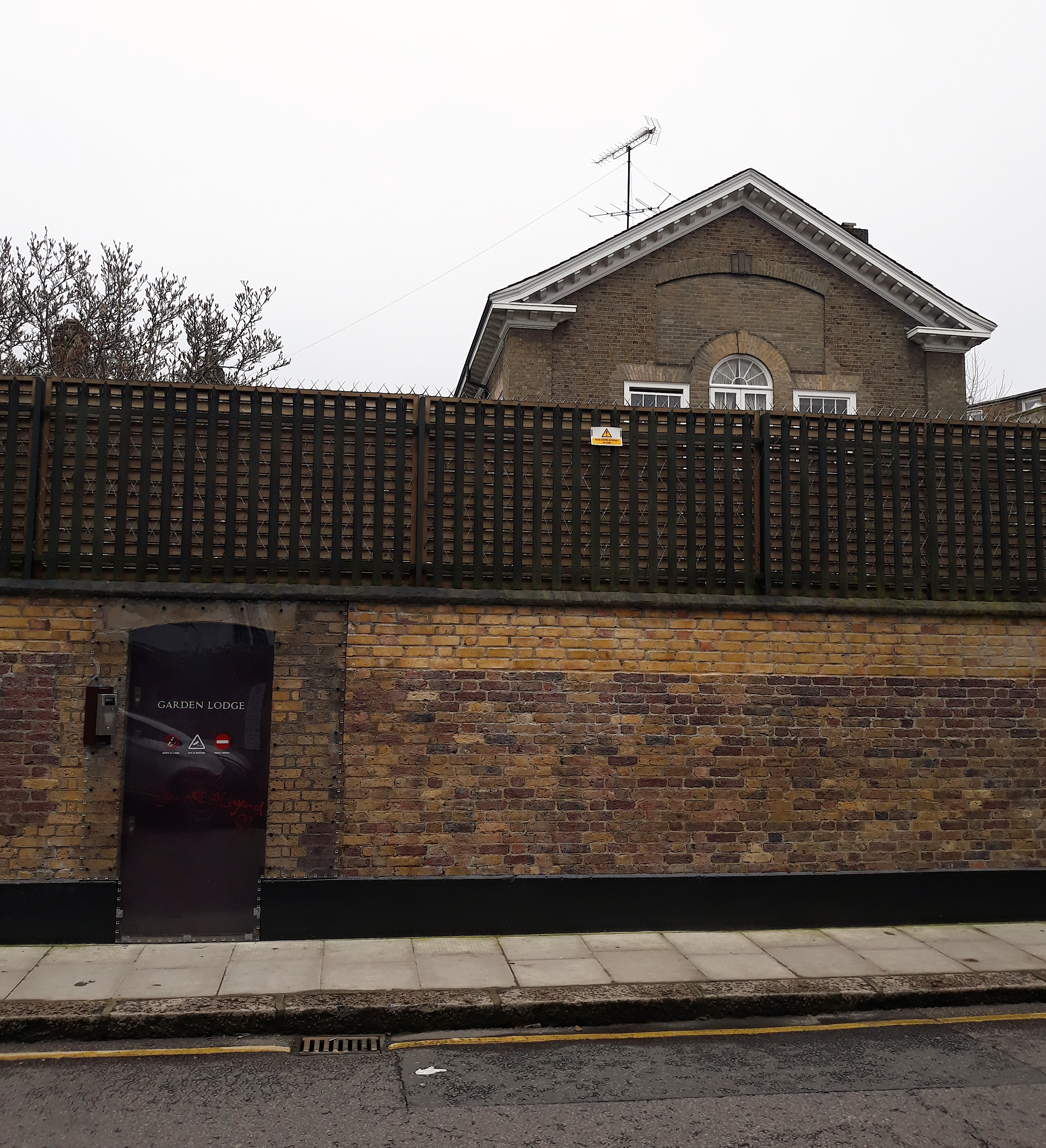
- The front wall of the building in 2018

General information
- Architectural style: Neo-Georgian
- Location: Logan Place, Kensington, London W8, England
- Coordinates: 51°29′39″N 0°11′54″W
- Construction started: 1908
- Construction stopped: 1909

Garden Lodge at Logan Place in Kensington, London W8, England, is a detached house that was completed in 1909 for the painter Cecil Rea and his wife, the sculptor Constance Halford.

The house has had several notable inhabitants since Rea including Peter Wilson, the chairman of Sotheby's auction house, and was the last residence of the singer and songwriter Freddie Mercury from 1980 until his death at the house in 1991.

== Description ==
The house was designed by the architect Ernest William Marshall and built in the Neo-Georgian style. It is two-storeys high with eight bedrooms, and a pedimented studio wing with a large bay window as a notable feature. The builders were M. Calnan and Son of Commercial Road. It is set on a fifth of an acre of landscaped grounds. The green door entrance to the garden of Garden Lodge has been a focal point for Mercury's fans since his death. It was frequently covered in graffiti and the site of letters or photos left by fans. The door was put up for sale in the Sotheby's auction in 2023 with an estimate of £15,000-25,000. It sold for £412,750. Sotheby's described the door as an "icon amongst monuments of popular culture in London" and that it was symbolic of a "gateway to [Mercury's] world". The house cannot be seen from the road and the garden is bordered by a 8ft high brick wall, topped with spikes. A large garden stands between the wall and the house. It was designed by Mercury in a Japanese style with magnolia trees and a carp pond. Bridget Cherry, writing in the 1991 London: North West edition of the Pevsner Architectural Guides described the house as "well hidden".

Specific rooms include the Japanese room, situated to the left of the entrance of the house. Mercury would seek privacy in the room. The house has eight bedrooms. The dining room is on the ground floor. Mercury painted designs in pink, green and yellow on the dining room walls himself. The largest ground floor room is the studio drawing room, which was home to Mercury's Yamaha baby grand piano. It was the primary room for entertaining. The piano sold for £1.7 million at the Sotheby's auction. The room has an ornate stone fireplace and wooden floors with yellow walls. The room has a staircase leading to an upstairs bar area which has been described as a 'Minstrels' gallery'. The kitchen and cloakroom are also on the ground floor.

Mercury's dressing room has floor-to-ceiling mirrors and is decorated in the Art Deco style. One of the en-suite bathrooms has "F.M." engraved in the marble.

== Occupants ==
Cecil Rea occupied the house from its completion until his death in 1935. His wife Constance survived him and lived there until her death in 1938. The British intelligence operative Tomás Harris and his wife Hilda moved to the house during the Second World War and hosted many MI5 and SIS employees at the property. Two men were convicted in August 1968 of stealing £16,000 of antiques including "foreign coins, clay figures, and china and marble" from Garden Lodge when it was Wilson's residence.

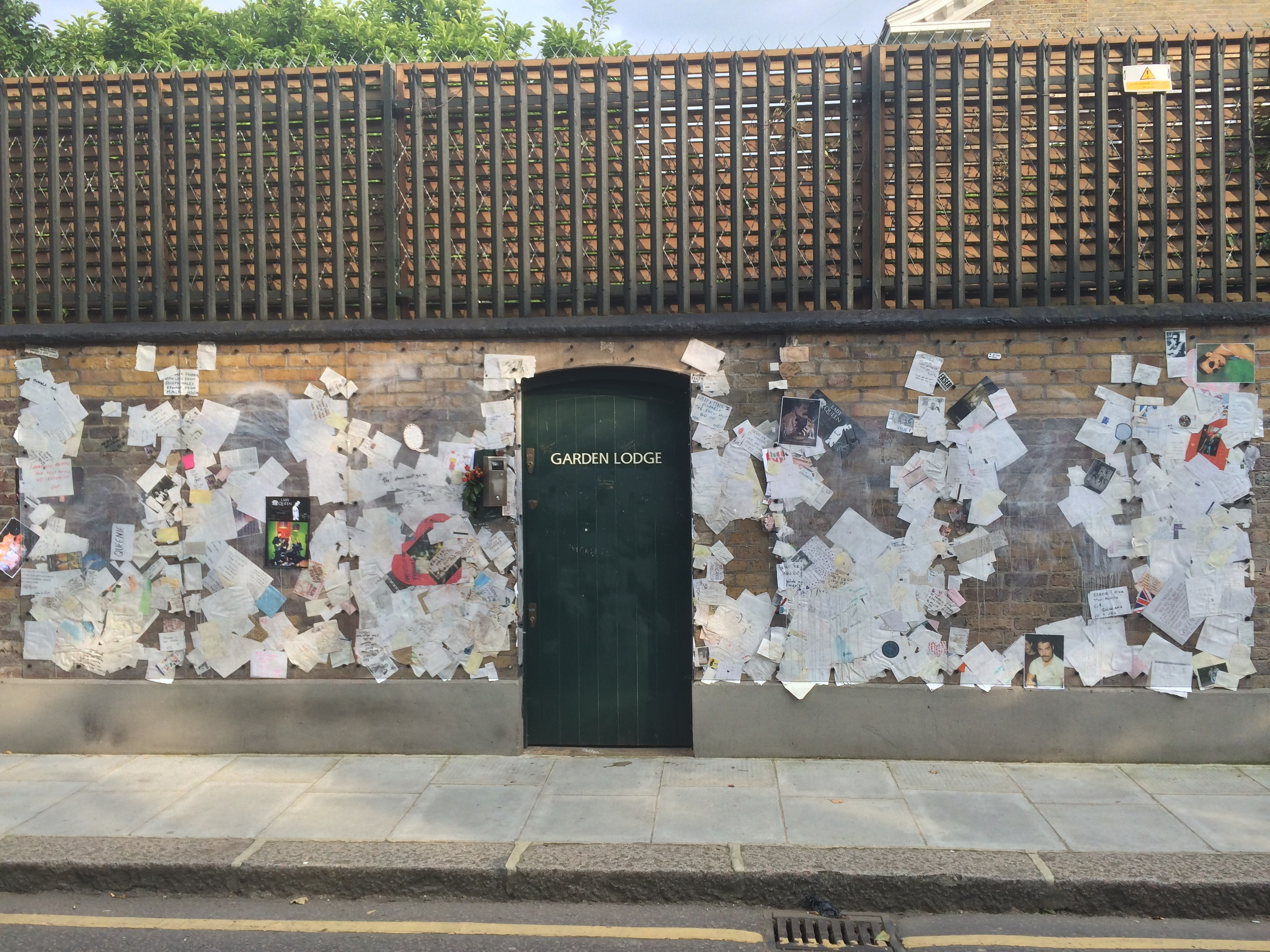
After Freddie Mercury's death, the outer wall of Garden Lodge became a shrine to the late singer

The home was advertised for sale in a 1978 issue of Country Life with offers in excess of £300,000. It was described as "standing in its own grounds ... a unique, low-built, detached house with a superb studio". Freddie Mercury bought the house for £500,000 in cash from a member of the Hoare family early in 1980 (equivalent to £2,145,452 in 2025). Mercury and Austin viewed the house together in 1980 and he decided to buy the house that day. The interiors were decorated by Robin Moore Ede under Mercury. The house was inherited by Mercury's close friend Mary Austin following his death at the house in 1991. She described the house as only hers "in name only" as the house would " ...always be his. It was his dream, it was his vision".

Mercury's possessions from the house were sold at auction at Sotheby's in September 2023. The auction raised $50 million. Part of the proceeds of the auction benefited the Mercury Phoenix Trust and the Elton John AIDS Foundation. In 2024 the house was put for sale by Austin for offers over £30 million by the estate agent Knight Frank. Austin described the house as "the most glorious memory box, because it has such love and warmth in every room" and that it had "been a place of peace, a true artist's house, and now is the time to entrust that sense of peace to the next person". Austin had first considered selling the house 25 years previously but was not mentally prepared to do so. Austin said that she does not want someone to buy the house to "exploit it, and demolish it" as it was unique and beautiful.
