= Jim Beach =

English music manager

- Born: Henry James Beach; 9 March 1942 (age 84); Gloucester, England
- Other name: Miami
- Occupations: Lawyer; music manager
- Spouse: Claudia Beach
- Children: 2

Henry James Beach (born 9 March 1942) is an English lawyer and talent manager best known as the long-term manager of the rock band Queen, its individual members, and the comedy group Monty Python.

== Early life ==
Beach was born in Gloucester. He was educated at Cheltenham College and Queens' College, Cambridge, where he read law. He was a member of the Cambridge Footlights. While at Cambridge he became a friend of John Cleese. In 1963 he went on a road tour of England and Scotland with future Monty Python member Eric Idle and future Goodies member Graeme Garden as their piano player.

== Career ==
Beach took over as manager of the rock band Queen in 1978 after he had acted on their behalf as a lawyer. He was nicknamed "Miami" by Freddie Mercury, a play on his surname.

Beach was a producer of the biopic film Bohemian Rhapsody (2018). He was portrayed by Tom Hollander.

Beach is the co-founder of the Mercury Phoenix Trust, which promotes HIV/AIDS prevention worldwide. He is also co-founder of the Transistor Project with Blur's Dave Rowntree.

Beach became Monty Python's manager after their reunion performance at The O2 Arena in 2014. According to John Cleese, he later resigned from the role after suffering a stroke.

== Personal life ==
Beach lives in Montreux, Switzerland. He is married to Claudia Beach and has a daughter and a son, Ol, who is frontman for the band Yellowire and was formerly the keyboard player for the rock band Wire Daisies, discovered by Queen's Roger Taylor.
