= Sour Milk Sea (band) =

English heavy blues rock band

- Sour Milk Sea in 1970

Background information
- Origin: Oxford, England
- Genres: Hard rock; blues rock
- Years active: 1969–1970
- Past members: Chris Dummett; Jeremy Gallop; Paul Milne; Rob Tyrrell; Freddie Bulsara

Sour Milk Sea were a short-lived English heavy blues rock band formed in mid-1969 by Chris Dummett, Jeremy Gallop and Paul Milne, students of St. Edward's School. The three were inspired to change their band name, Tomato City, to the name of George Harrison's song "Sour Milk Sea". With the addition of drummer Rob Tyrrell, the original band featured Dummett on lead guitar, Gallop on rhythm guitar and Milne on bass. The group is notable for its next acquisition of singer Freddie Mercury (then known as Freddie Bulsara) who would later join the rock band Smile, who changed their name to Queen.

== History ==
In 1968, Tomato City was formed and composed of Dummett (lead guitar), Gallop (rhythm guitar), and Milne (bass). They did not have a distinct lead singer yet, so Dummett took it upon himself to perform the majority of the vocals in live performances. As Tomato City, the band played locally in the school, mainly classrooms. By 1969, Dummett and Gallop decided to change the group name to Sour Milk Sea. Milne continued to remain as the bass player and the group added Rob Tyrrell, formerly of Genesis forerunner Anon, to the vacant drummer spot. In June 1969, the group became professional, and made their debut at the Guildford City Hall. They supported groups like Deep Purple, Junior's Eyes, and Taste.

The group gained a sizeable local following, with around one hundred people coming to their performances. Still, the group lacked a true lead singer and frontman. Freddie Mercury, future lead singer of Queen, was looking for a new band after his previous band, Wreckage, broke up. Mercury saw an advert in the Melody Maker simply stating, "Vocalist Wanted". Mercury would have a successful audition and became lead vocalist of Sour Milk Sea in February 1970.

With Mercury as frontman, the band had the habit of performing two to three times a week. Two gigs, one at the Randolph Hotel in Oxford, and another on 21 March 1970 at Highfield Parish Hall, are the most notable. Despite not yet having a cohesive unit, Mercury still managed to keep the audience entertained throughout the Oxford performance. Sour Milk Sea would perform songs written by Freddie Mercury which included "Lover", which was the original name for the Queen song "Liar", "Blag", and "FEWA". Along with Mercury's songs, the band also played live covers of songs like Jailhouse Rock and Little Richard's song "Lucille". Since no known recordings of the band exist, it cannot be determined what other songs the band may have played. The Highfield Parish Hall gig was a charity event just weeks before Mercury would join Brian May and Roger Taylor to form Queen. It is prominent for being the last gig with Mercury and for its write up in the local paper, Oxford Mail. The article includes a biopic of each group member along with the only known photo of the band with Mercury. It also includes lyrics from Mercury's composition, "Lover".

Ultimately, Mercury's drive toward a creative new sound and control of the band would lead to its premature downfall. Mercury and Dummett began living together in Mercury's apartment as close friends. Gallop became worried that Dummett would side with Mercury on the band's musical direction and disbanded the group. The band had been in heated debates since Mercury joined just weeks earlier. He owned all the equipment so there would be no chance that the group could continue. In April 1970, Freddie Mercury joined the band Smile, which, upon Mercury's insistence, became known as Queen.

== Aftermath ==
Freddie Mercury would go on with Queen to become one of the most successful and enduring acts in history. Within three years Queen would release their debut album, Queen. Chris Dummett would play one last time with Mercury in a practice session at Imperial Lecture Theatre. These same sessions included future bassist John Deacon and the rest of Queen. The collective of musicians would practice future Queen tracks. Mercury hoped to add a second guitarist, but the session did not pan out and Dummett would no longer be included in the band activities. Mercury and Chris Dummett would not cross paths again until 1987.
