= Cecil Rea =

British fashion artist

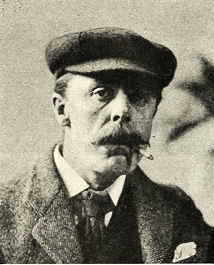
- Rea before 1898
- Born: Cecil William Rea; 1860
- Died: 1935 (aged 74–75)
- Occupation: Artist

Cecil William Rea (1860–1935) was a British artist.

== Later life ==
In 1897, he was living at 53 Beaufort Street, Chelsea, London.

== Personal life ==
In 1908 to 1909, Garden Lodge, in Logan Place, Kensington, a neo-Georgian house behind a high brick wall, was built for him and his wife, the sculptor Constance Halford. The architect was Ernest Marshall. Rea lived there until he died in 1935, and Halford until her death in 1938.

== Artwork ==
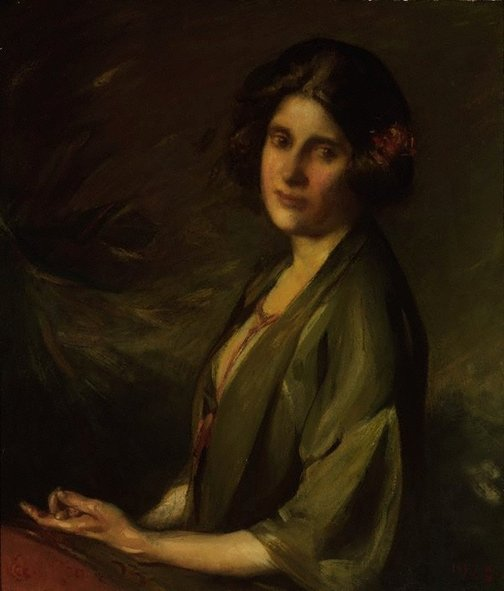
Portrait of Inez Bensusan, 1924, in the Art Gallery of NSW.

His work is in the permanent collections of the Victoria and Albert Museum, the Art Gallery of New South Wales, Sydney and the Paul Mellon Centre.

In 1993, an artwork of his sold at Christie's for £1430.
