= Helen Ballard =

British horticulturist

- Born: Grace Helen Ranken; 11 January 1908; Waldron, UK
- Died: 28 May 1995 (aged 87); Worcester, UK
- Other names: Hellebore Queen
- Occupation: Horticulturist
- Partner(s): Peter Cecil Wilson, Philip Ernest Ballard

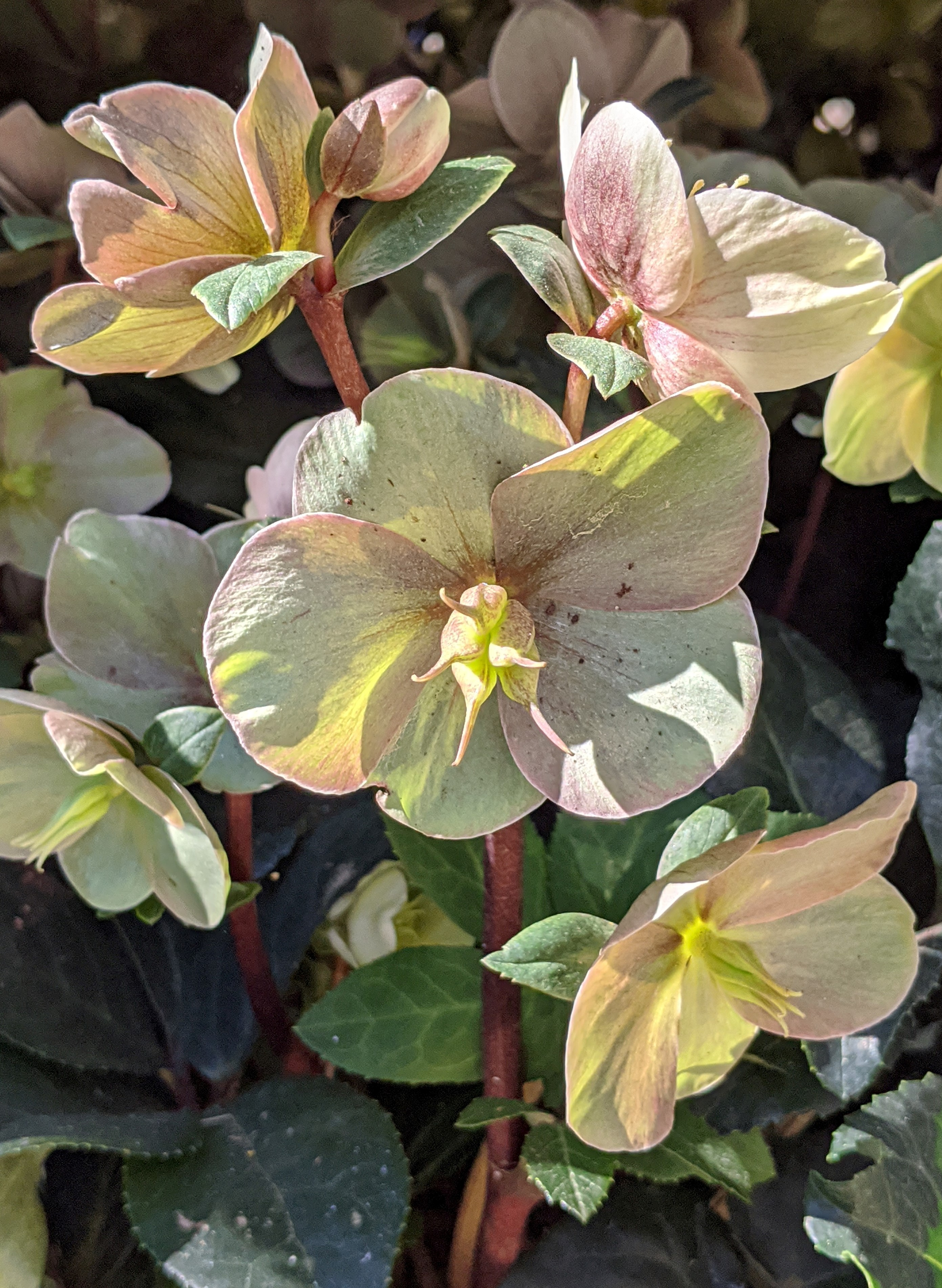
Helleborus × ballardiae 'Cinnamon Snow'

Grace Helen Ballard, also known as Grace Helen Wilson and born Grace Helen Ranken (11 January 1908 – 28 May 1995), was a British horticulturist known for her hellebore hybrids.

== Early life ==
Ballard was born in Waldron in 1908. Her parents were Sarah Kate (born Phillips) and Arthur William Ranken. Her father was an electrical engineer.

Whilst she was in Hamburg, Ballard met her first husband, Peter Cecil Wilson, who was learning German there. He became a successful art auctioneer at Sotheby's. They had two children before her husband realised his latent homosexuality. They dissolved their marriage in 1951.

She went on to marry Philip Ernest Ballard the same year. Her new father-in-law Ernest Ballard is credited with giving her four hellebore roots and she then became interested in horticulture and hellebores in particular.

== Career ==
She bred new hybrids and went abroad to find new varieties. She discovered new colours and new forms. She was called the "Queen of the Breeders". Wilson died in Paris in 1984. He had risen to lead the auction house of Sotheby's and had become a difficult character. Despite this and the divorce they had kept in contact. Her second husband died in 1987.

Helen Ballard worked near Malvern and Elizabeth Strangman had similar interests in Kent. These two "hellebore horticulturalists" became so important that some felt that hellebores would go into decline when they were no longer around; both shared the skills. Ballard arranged for her stock to be given to Gisela Schmiemann in Cologne who established a mail order business based on these varieties.

== Death ==
Ballard died in Worcester in 1995. A book written by Gisela Schmiemann and titled Helen Ballard - The Hellebore Queen was published in 1997.
