= Freddie Mercury =

British rock singer and songwriter (1946–1991)

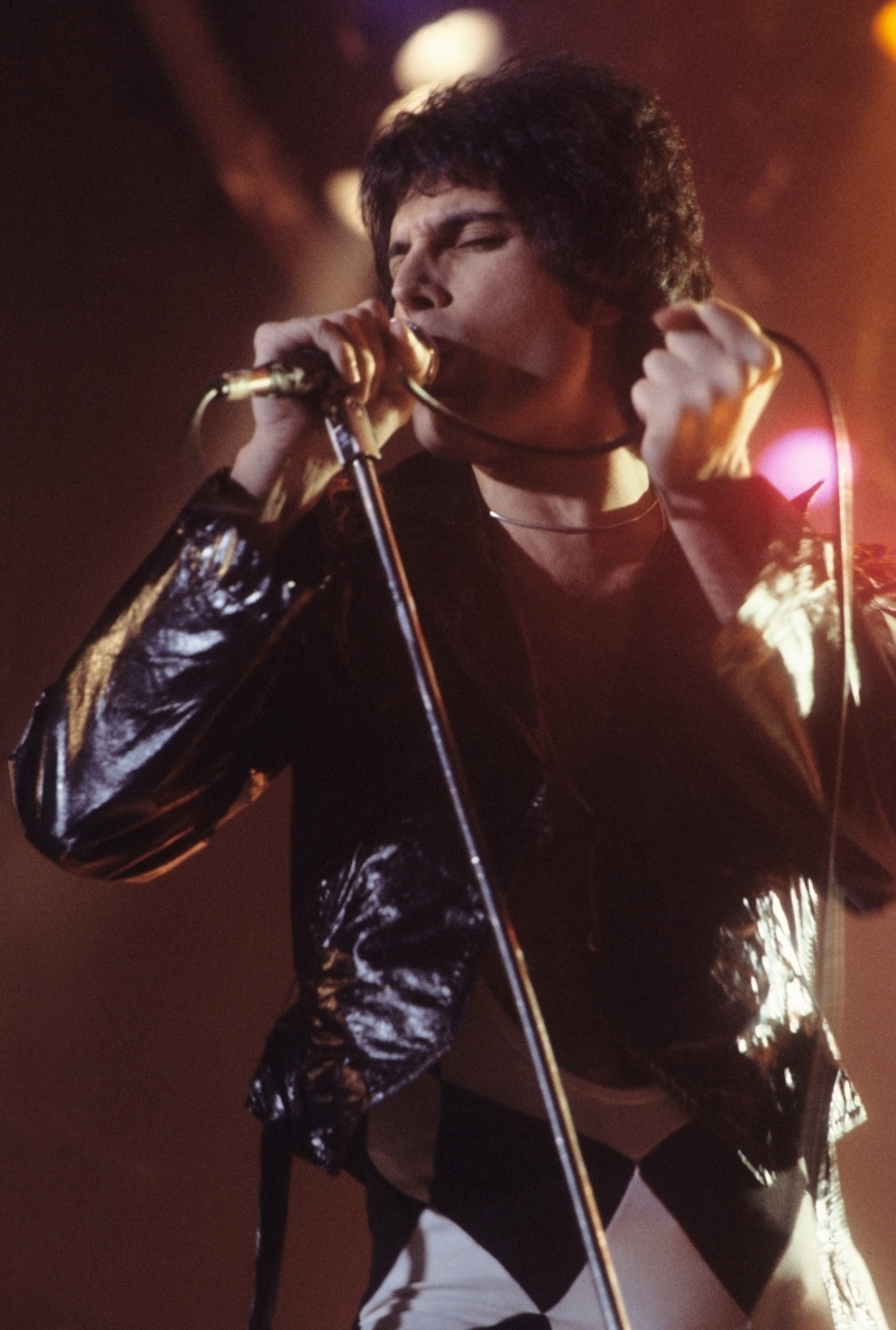
- Mercury in 1977
- Born: Farrokh Bulsara; 5 September 1946; Stone Town, Sultanate of Zanzibar
- Died: 24 November 1991 (aged 45); Kensington, London, England
- Other names: Freddie Bulsara; Larry Lurex
- Education: Ealing Art College; Isleworth Polytechnic
- Occupations: Singer; musician; songwriter
- Years active: 1969–1991
- Notable work: Discography
- Partners: Mary Austin (1970–1976); Jim Hutton (1985–1991)
- Musical career
- Genres: Rock; pop
- Instruments: Vocals; piano
- Labels: Columbia; Polydor; EMI; Parlophone; Hollywood
- Formerly of: Queen; Ibex; Sour Milk Sea

Freddie Mercury (born Farrokh Bulsara; 5 September 1946 – 24 November 1991) was a British singer and songwriter who achieved global fame as the lead vocalist and pianist of the rock band Queen. Regarded as one of the greatest singers in the history of rock music, he is known for his flamboyant stage persona and four-octave vocal range. Mercury defied the conventions of a rock frontman with his theatrical style, influencing the artistic direction of Queen.

Born in 1946 in Zanzibar to Indian parents from the Parsi community, Mercury attended British boarding schools in India from the age of eight and returned to Zanzibar after secondary school. In 1964, his family fled the Zanzibar Revolution, moving to Middlesex, England. Having previously studied and written music, he formed Queen in 1970 with guitarist Brian May and drummer Roger Taylor. Mercury wrote numerous hits for Queen, including "Killer Queen", "Bohemian Rhapsody", "Somebody to Love", "We Are the Champions", "Don't Stop Me Now" and "Crazy Little Thing Called Love". His charismatic stage performances often saw him interact with the audience, as displayed at the 1985 Live Aid concert. He also had a solo career and was a producer and guest musician for other artists.

Mercury was diagnosed with AIDS in 1987. He continued to record with Queen, and was posthumously featured on their final album, Made in Heaven (1995). In 1991, the day after publicly announcing his diagnosis, he died from complications of the disease at the age of 45. In 1992, a concert in tribute to him was held at Wembley Stadium, in benefit of AIDS awareness.

As a member of Queen, Mercury was posthumously inducted into the Rock and Roll Hall of Fame in 2001, the Songwriters Hall of Fame in 2003, and the UK Music Hall of Fame in 2004. In 1990, he and the other Queen members received the Brit Award for Outstanding Contribution to British Music. One year after his death, Mercury received the same award individually. In 2005, Queen were awarded an Ivor Novello Award for Outstanding Song Collection from the British Academy of Songwriters, Composers, and Authors. In 2002, Mercury was voted number 58 in the BBC's poll of the 100 Greatest Britons.

== Early life ==
=== Zanzibar and India ===
Mercury was born Farrokh Bulsara in Stone Town in the British protectorate of Zanzibar (now part of Tanzania), in East Africa on 5 September 1946. He was born with four extra incisors, to which some have attributed his enhanced vocal range. His parents, Bomi and Jer Bulsara, were Indian Gujarati Parsi, from western India. (Note: On Mercury's birth certificate, his parents identified as "Nationality: British Indian" and "Race: Parsi". The Parsis are an ethnic group of Persian origin and have lived on the Indian subcontinent for more than a thousand years. The Bulsara family gets its name from Bulsar, now Valsad, a city and district that is now in the Indian state of Gujarat. In the 17th century, Bulsar was one of the five centres of the Zoroastrian religion (the other four were also in what is today Gujarat) and consequently Bulsara is a relatively common name among Parsi Zoroastrians.) He had a younger sister, Kashmira (b. 1952).

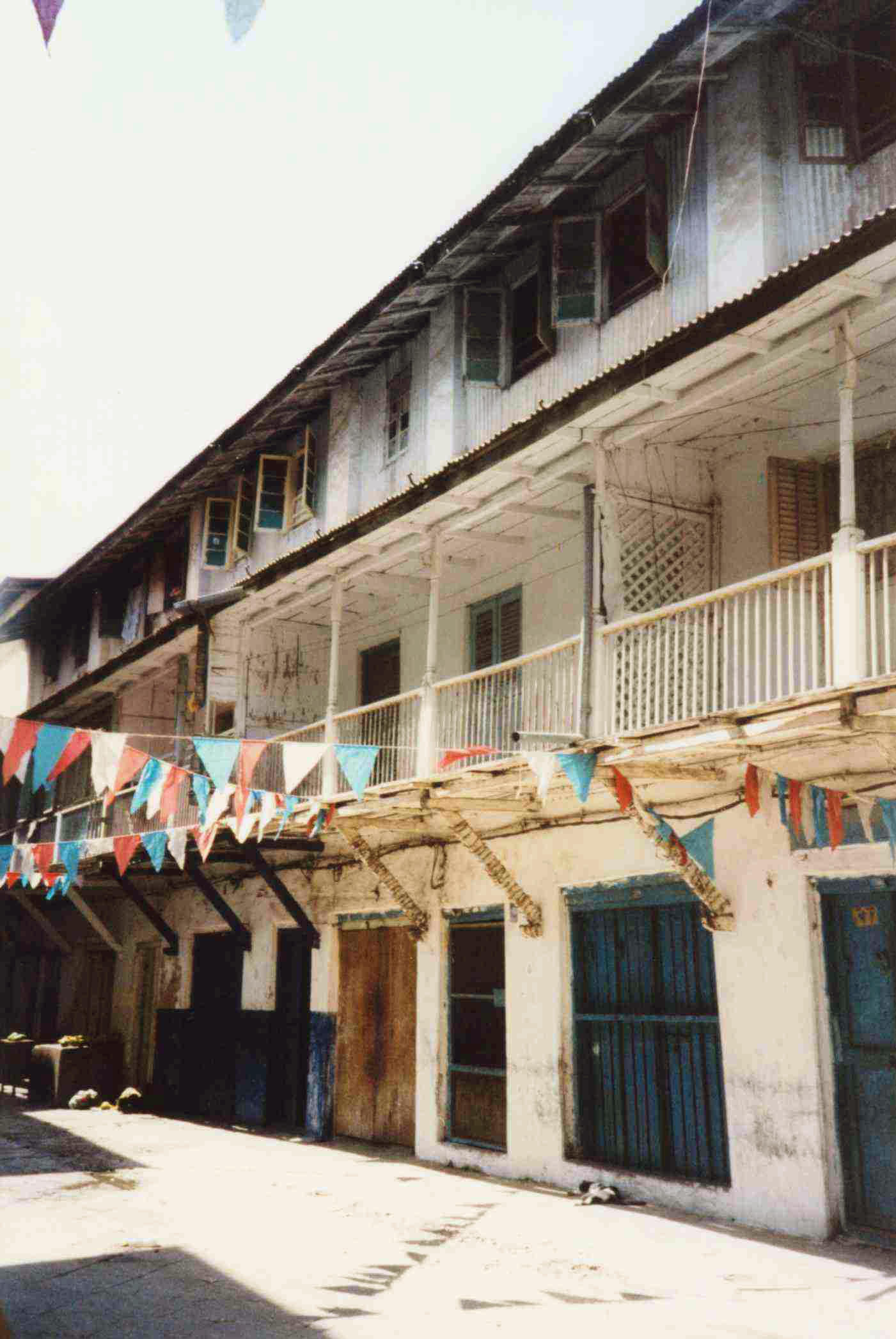
The house in Zanzibar where Mercury lived in his early years

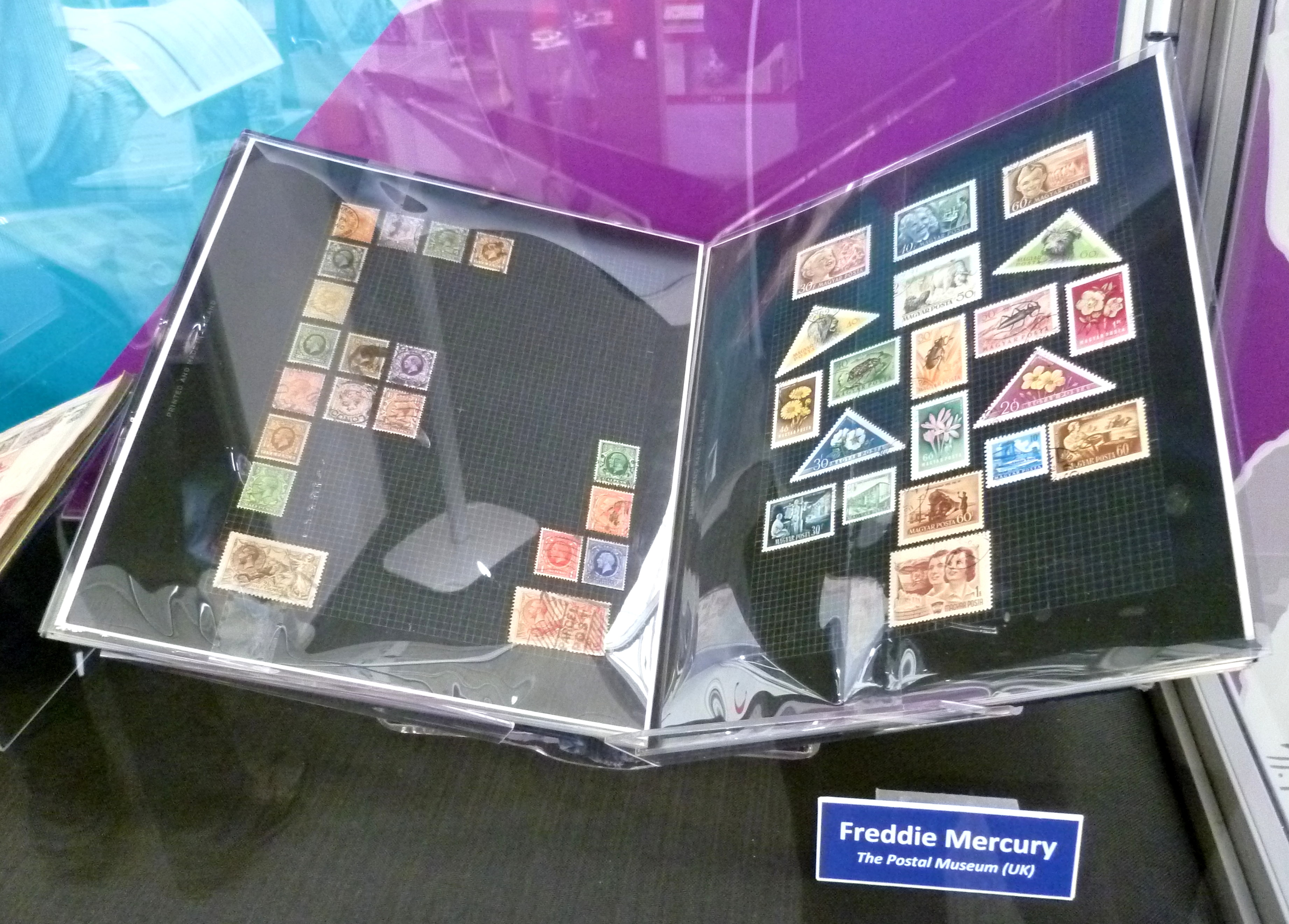
Mercury's stamp album at the Postal Museum in London

The family had moved to Zanzibar so that Bomi could continue his job as a cashier at the British Colonial Office. As Parsis, the Bulsaras practised Zoroastrianism. As Zanzibar was a British protectorate until 1963, Mercury was born a British subject, and on 2 June 1969 was registered a citizen of the United Kingdom and Colonies after the family had emigrated to England.

Mercury spent most of his childhood in India, where he began taking piano lessons at the age of seven while living with relatives. In 1954, at the age of eight, Mercury was sent to study at St. Peter's School, a British-style boarding school for boys, in Panchgani near Bombay. Inheriting his father's interest in philately, between 9 and 12 years old Mercury collected stamps, many of which were from the British Commonwealth. One of the rare personal possessions of Mercury in museum ownership, his stamp album, is displayed in the collection of the Postal Museum in London. At the age of 12, he formed a school band, the Hectics, and covered rock and roll artists such as Cliff Richard, Elvis Presley and Little Richard. One of Mercury's former bandmates from the Hectics has said "the only music he listened to, and played, was Western pop music". A friend recalls that he had "an uncanny ability to listen to the radio and replay what he heard on piano". It was also at St. Peter's where he began to call himself "Freddie". In February 1963, he moved back to Zanzibar where he joined his parents at their flat.

=== Fleeing to England ===
In the spring of 1964, Mercury and his family fled to England from Zanzibar to escape the violence of the revolution against the Sultan of Zanzibar and his mainly Arab government, in which thousands of ethnic Arabs and Indians were killed. They moved to 19 Hamilton Close, Feltham, Middlesex, a town 13 miles (21 km) west of central London. The Bulsaras briefly relocated to 122 Hamilton Road, before settling into a small house at 22 Gladstone Avenue in late October. After first studying art at Isleworth Polytechnic in West London, Mercury studied graphic art and design at Ealing Art College, graduating with a diploma in 1969. He later used these skills to design heraldic arms for his band Queen.

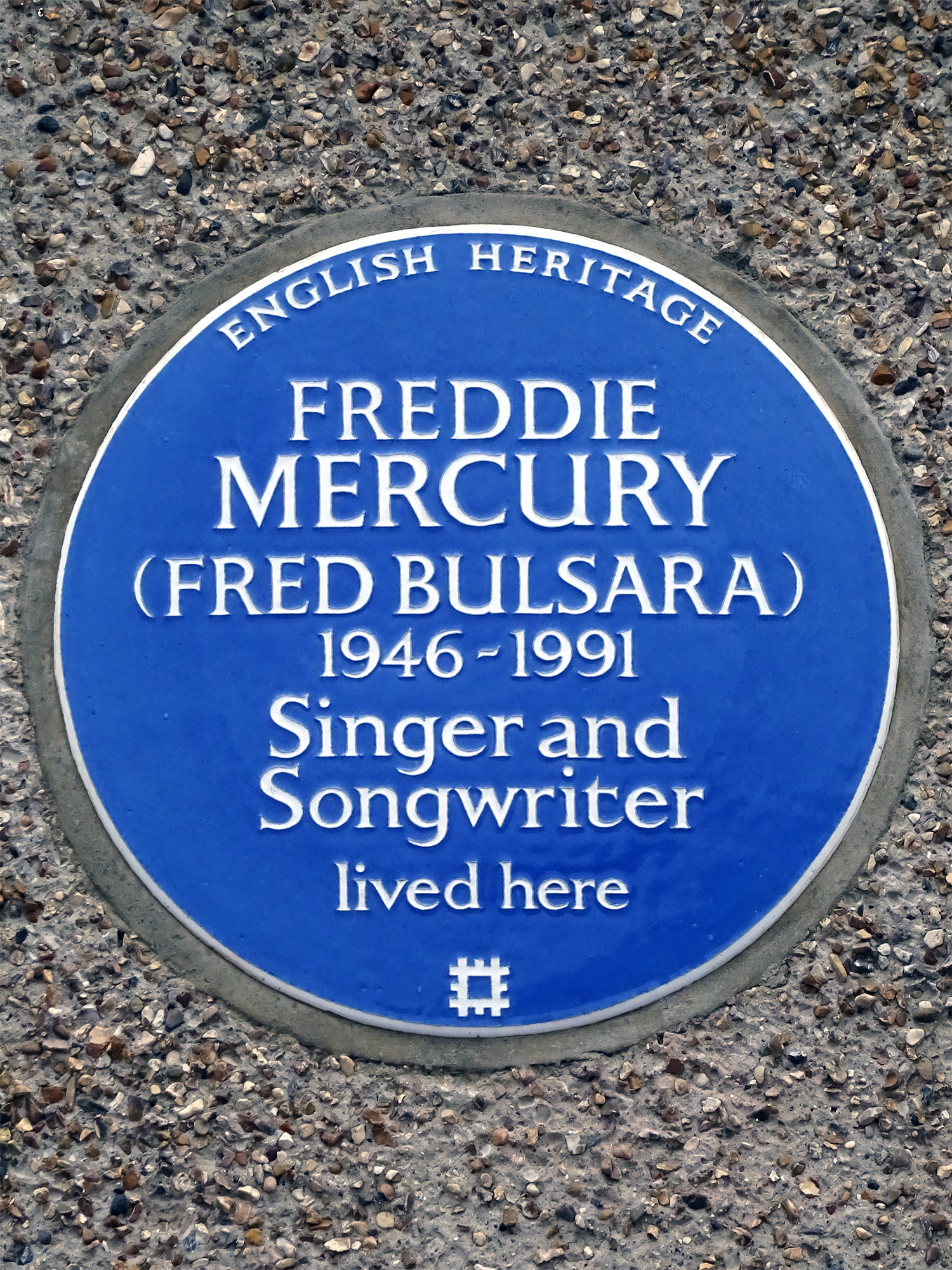
English Heritage blue plaque at 22 Gladstone Avenue, Feltham, London

Following graduation, Mercury joined a series of bands and sold second-hand Edwardian clothes and scarves in Kensington Market in London with drummer and future bandmate Roger Taylor. Taylor recalls, "Back then, I didn't really know him as a singer—he was just my mate. My crazy mate! If there was fun to be had, Freddie and I were usually involved." He also held a job as a baggage handler at Heathrow Airport. Other friends from the time remember him as a quiet and shy young man with a great interest in music. In 1969, he joined Liverpool-based band Ibex, later renamed Wreckage, which played "very Hendrix-style, heavy blues". He briefly lived in a flat above the Dovedale Towers, a pub on Penny Lane in Liverpool's Mossley Hill district. When this band failed to take off, he joined an Oxford-based band, Sour Milk Sea, but by early 1970 this group had broken up as well.

In April 1970, Mercury teamed up with Taylor and guitarist Brian May to become lead singer of their band Smile. They were joined by bassist John Deacon in 1971. Despite the reservations of the other members and Trident Studios, the band's initial management, Mercury chose the name "Queen" for the new band. He later said, "It's very regal obviously, and it sounds splendid. It's a strong name, very universal and immediate. I was certainly aware of the gay connotations, but that was just one facet of it." At about the same time, he legally changed his surname, Bulsara, to Mercury.

Shortly before the release of Queen's self-titled first album, Mercury designed the band's logo, known as the "Queen crest". The logo combines the zodiac signs of the four band members: two lions for Deacon and Taylor (sign Leo), a crab for May (Cancer), and two fairies for Mercury (Virgo). The lions embrace a stylised letter Q, the crab rests atop the letter with flames rising directly above it, and the fairies are each sheltering below a lion. A crown is shown inside the Q, and the whole logo is overshadowed by an enormous phoenix. The Queen crest bears a passing resemblance to the Royal coat of arms of the United Kingdom, particularly with the lion supporters.

== Artistry ==
=== Vocals ===
Mercury's vocal range

Although Mercury's speaking voice naturally fell in the baritone range, he delivered most songs in the tenor range. His known vocal range extended from bass low F (F_{2}) to soprano high F (F_{6}). He could belt up to tenor high F (F_{5}). Biographer David Bret described his voice as "escalating within a few bars from a deep, throaty rock-growl to tender, vibrant tenor, then on to a high-pitched, perfect coloratura, pure and crystalline in the upper reaches". Spanish soprano Montserrat Caballé, with whom Mercury recorded an album, expressed her opinion that "the difference between Freddie and almost all the other rock stars was that he was selling the voice". She adds:

His technique was astonishing. No problem of tempo, he sang with an incisive sense of rhythm, his vocal placement was very good and he was able to glide effortlessly from a register to another. He also had a great musicality. His phrasing was subtle, delicate and sweet or energetic and slamming. He was able to find the right colouring or expressive nuance for each word.

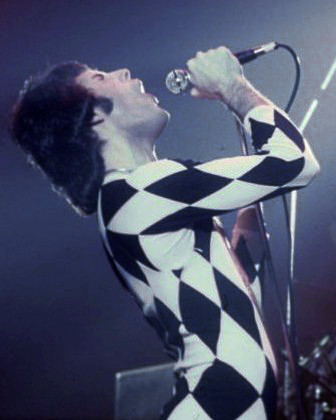
Mercury singing on stage in November 1977

The Who lead singer Roger Daltrey described Mercury as "the best virtuoso rock 'n' roll singer of all time. He could sing anything in any style. He could change his style from line to line and, God, that's an art. And he was brilliant at it." Discussing what type of person he wanted to play the lead role in his musical Jesus Christ Superstar, Andrew Lloyd Webber said: "He has to be of enormous charisma, but he also has to be a genuine, genuine rock tenor. That's what it is. Really think Freddie Mercury, I mean that's the kind of range we're talking about."

A research team undertook a study in 2016 to understand the appeal behind Mercury's voice. Led by Professor Christian Herbst, the team identified his notably faster vibrato and use of subharmonics as unique characteristics of Mercury's voice, particularly in comparison to opera singers. The research team studied vocal samples from 23 commercially available Queen recordings, his solo work, and a series of interviews of the late artist. They also used an endoscopic video camera to study a rock singer brought in to imitate Mercury's singing voice.

=== Songwriting ===
Mercury wrote 10 of the 17 songs on Queen's Greatest Hits album: "Bohemian Rhapsody", "Seven Seas of Rhye", "Killer Queen", "Somebody to Love", "Good Old-Fashioned Lover Boy", "We Are the Champions", "Bicycle Race", "Don't Stop Me Now", "Crazy Little Thing Called Love", and "Play the Game". In 2003 Mercury was posthumously inducted into the Songwriters Hall of Fame with the rest of Queen, and in 2005 all four band members were awarded an Ivor Novello Award for Outstanding Song Collection from the British Academy of Songwriters, Composers, and Authors.

The most notable aspect of his songwriting involved the wide range of genres that he used, which included, among other styles, rockabilly, progressive rock, heavy metal, gospel, and disco. As he explained in a 1986 interview, "I hate doing the same thing again and again and again. I like to see what's happening now in music, film and theatre and incorporate all of those things." Compared to many popular songwriters, Mercury also tended to write musically complex material. For example, "Bohemian Rhapsody" is non-cyclical in structure and comprises dozens of chords. He also wrote six songs from Queen II which deal with multiple key changes and complex material. "Crazy Little Thing Called Love", on the other hand, contains only a few chords. Although Mercury often wrote very intricate harmonies, he said that he could barely read music. He composed most of his songs on the piano and used a wide variety of key signatures.

=== Live performer ===
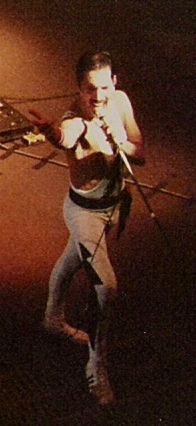
Mercury performing live in September 1984

Mercury was noted for his live performances, which were often delivered to stadium audiences around the world. He displayed a highly theatrical style that often evoked a great deal of participation from the crowd. A writer for The Spectator described him as "a performer out to tease, shock and ultimately charm his audience with various extravagant versions of himself." David Bowie, who performed at the Freddie Mercury Tribute Concert and recorded the song "Under Pressure" with Queen, praised Mercury's performance style, saying: "Of all the more theatrical rock performers, Freddie took it further than the rest ... he took it over the edge. And of course, I always admired a man who wears tights. I only saw him in concert once and as they say, he was definitely a man who could hold an audience in the palm of his hand." Queen guitarist Brian May wrote that Mercury could make "the last person at the back of the furthest stand in a stadium feel that he was connected". Mercury's main prop on stage was a broken microphone stand; after accidentally snapping it off the heavy base during an early performance, he realised it could be used in endless ways.

One of Mercury's most notable performances with Queen took place at Live Aid in 1985. Queen's performance at the event has since been voted by a group of music executives as the greatest live performance in the history of rock music. The results were aired on a television program called "The World's Greatest Gigs". Mercury's powerful, sustained note during the a cappella section came to be known as "The Note Heard Round the World". In 2005, John Harris wrote, "Those who compile lists of Great Rock Frontmen and award the top spots to Mick Jagger, Robert Plant et al are guilty of a terrible oversight. Freddie, as evidenced by his Dionysian Live Aid performance, was easily the most godlike of them all." Photographer Denis O'Regan, who captured a definitive pose of Mercury on stage—arched back, knee bent and facing toward the sky—during his final tour with Queen in 1986, commented "Freddie was a once-in-a-lifetime showman". Queen roadie Peter Hince states, "It wasn't just about his voice but the way he commanded the stage. For him it was all about interacting with the audience and knowing how to get them on his side. And he gave everything in every show."

Throughout his career, Mercury performed an estimated 700 concerts in countries around the world with Queen. A notable aspect of Queen concerts was the large scale involved. He once explained, "We're the Cecil B. DeMille of rock and roll, always wanting to do things bigger and better." The band was the first ever to play in South American stadiums, breaking worldwide records for concert attendance in the Morumbi Stadium in São Paulo in 1981. In 1986, Queen also played behind the Iron Curtain when they performed to a crowd of 80,000 in Budapest, in what was one of the biggest rock concerts ever held in Eastern Europe. Mercury's final live performance with Queen took place on 9 August 1986 at Knebworth Park in England and drew an attendance estimated as high as 200,000. A week prior to Knebworth, May recalled Mercury saying "I'm not going to be doing this forever. This is probably the last time." With the British national anthem "God Save the Queen" playing at the end of the concert, Mercury's final act on stage saw him draped in a robe, holding a golden crown aloft, bidding farewell to the crowd.

=== Instrumentalist ===
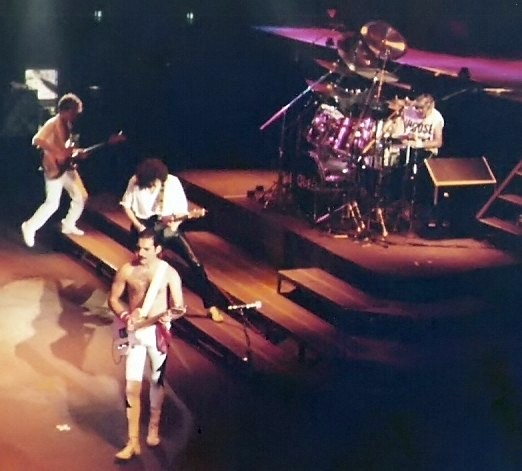
Mercury playing rhythm guitar during a Queen concert in Frankfurt, West Germany, 1984

As a young boy in India, Mercury received formal piano training up to the age of nine. Later on, while living in London, he learned guitar. Much of the music he liked was guitar-oriented: his favourite artists at the time were the Who, the Beatles, Jimi Hendrix, David Bowie, and Led Zeppelin. He was often self-deprecating about his skills on both instruments. Brian May said that Mercury "had a wonderful touch on the piano. He could play what came from inside him like nobody else – incredible rhythm, incredible passion and feeling." Keyboardist Rick Wakeman praised Mercury's playing style, saying he "discovered [the piano] for himself" and successfully composed a number of Queen songs on the instrument. From the early 1980s Mercury began extensively using guest keyboardists. Most notably, he enlisted Fred Mandel (a Canadian musician who also worked for Pink Floyd, Elton John, and Supertramp) for his first solo project. From 1982 Mercury collaborated with Morgan Fisher (who performed with Queen in concert during the Hot Space leg), and from 1985 onward Mercury collaborated with Mike Moran (in the studio) and Spike Edney (in concert).

Mercury played the piano in many of Queen's most popular songs, including "Killer Queen", "Bohemian Rhapsody", "Good Old-Fashioned Lover Boy", "We Are the Champions", "Somebody to Love", and "Don't Stop Me Now". He used concert grand pianos (such as a Bechstein) and, occasionally, other keyboard instruments such as the harpsichord. From 1980 onward, he also made frequent use of synthesisers in the studio. Brian May said that Mercury used the piano less over time because he wanted to walk around on stage and entertain the audience. Although he wrote many lines for the guitar, Mercury possessed only rudimentary skills on the instrument. Songs like "Ogre Battle" and "Crazy Little Thing Called Love" were composed on the guitar; the latter featured Mercury playing rhythm guitar on stage and in the studio.

=== Solo career ===
As well as his work with Queen, Mercury put out two solo albums and several singles. Although his solo work was not as commercially successful as most Queen albums, the two off-Queen albums and several of the singles debuted in the top 10 of the UK music charts. His first solo effort goes back to 1972 under the pseudonym Larry Lurex, when Trident Studios' house engineer Robin Geoffrey Cable was working in a musical project, at the time when Queen were recording their debut album; Cable enlisted Mercury to perform lead vocals on the songs "I Can Hear Music" and "Goin' Back", both were released together as a single in 1973. Eleven years later, Mercury contributed to the soundtrack for the restoration of the 1927 Fritz Lang film Metropolis. The song "Love Kills" was written for the film by Giorgio Moroder in collaboration with Mercury, and produced by Moroder and Mack; in 1984 it debuted at the number 10 position in the UK singles chart.

I won't be touring on my own or splitting up with Queen. Without the others I would be nothing. The press always makes out that I'm the wild one and they're all quiet, but it's not true. I've got some wild stories about Brian May you wouldn't believe.

— Mercury on his solo career, January 1985.

Mercury's two full albums outside the band were Mr. Bad Guy (1985) and Barcelona (1988). His first album, Mr. Bad Guy, debuted in the top ten of the UK Album Charts. In 1993, a remix of "Living on My Own", a single from the album, posthumously reached number one on the UK singles chart. The song also garnered Mercury a posthumous Ivor Novello Award from the British Academy of Songwriters, Composers and Authors. AllMusic critic Eduardo Rivadavia described Mr. Bad Guy as "outstanding from start to finish" and expressed his view that Mercury "did a commendable job of stretching into uncharted territory".

Mercury's second album, Barcelona, recorded with Spanish soprano vocalist Montserrat Caballé, combines elements of popular music and opera. Many critics were uncertain what to make of the album; one referred to it as "the most bizarre CD of the year". The album was a commercial success, and the album's title track debuted at No. 8 in the UK and was also a hit in Spain. The title track received massive airplay as the official anthem of the 1992 Summer Olympics (held in Barcelona one year after Mercury's death). Caballé sang it live at the opening of the Olympics with Mercury's part played on a screen, and again before the start of the 1999 UEFA Champions League Final between Manchester United and Bayern Munich in Barcelona.

In addition to the two solo albums, Mercury released several singles, including his own version of the 1950s hit "The Great Pretender" by the Platters, which peaked at number four in the UK in 1987. In September 2006 a compilation album featuring Mercury's solo work was released in the UK in honour of what would have been his 60th birthday. The album debuted in the UK top 10. In 2012, Freddie Mercury: The Great Pretender, a documentary film on Mercury's attempts to forge a solo career, directed by Rhys Thomas, premiered on BBC One.

In 1986, Mercury recorded two songs for Dave Clark's West End sci-fi musical Time. Mercury performed the title song and Clark played it to Laurence Olivier, who starred as the hologram Akash in a pre-filmed segment for the musical in one of his last roles. Clark recalled: "Laurence Olivier was a huge god of an actor. He narrated the album (Time), and, when Freddie came on, singing "Time", Olivier said, 'Now, my dear boy, there's an actor.'" Clark relayed the reaction of Olivier to Mercury: "I told Freddie and he was over the moon. I arranged for a dinner party at my place, Olivier came along and they got on like a house on fire."

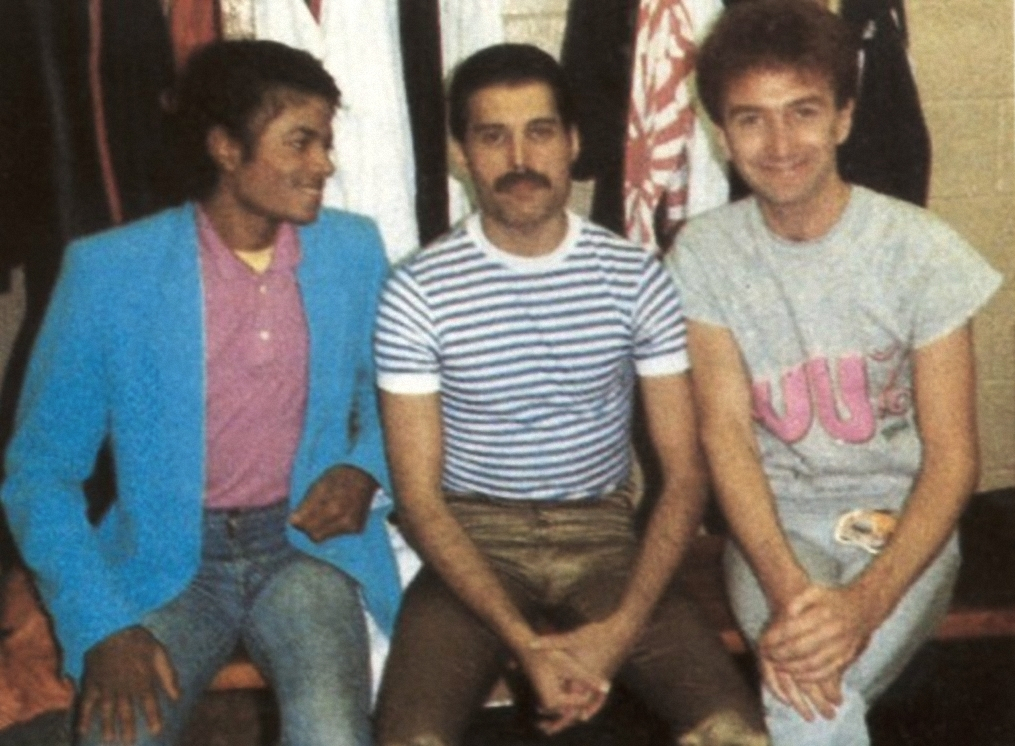
Mercury with Michael Jackson (left) and John Deacon in 1982

Between 1981 and 1983, Mercury recorded several tracks with Michael Jackson, including a demo of "State of Shock", "Victory", and "There Must Be More to Life Than This". None of these collaborations were officially released at the time, although bootleg recordings exist. Jackson went on to record the single "State of Shock" with Mick Jagger for the Jacksons' album Victory. Mercury included the solo version of "There Must Be More to Life Than This" on his album Mr. Bad Guy. "There Must Be More to Life Than This" was eventually reworked by Queen and released on their compilation album Queen Forever in 2014. Mercury and Roger Taylor sang on the title track for Billy Squier's 1982 studio release, Emotions in Motion, and later contributed to two tracks on Squier's 1986 release, Enough Is Enough, providing vocals on "Love is the Hero" and musical arrangements on "Lady With a Tenor Sax". In 2020, Mercury's music video for "Love Me Like There's No Tomorrow" was nominated for Best Animation at the Berlin Music Video Awards. Woodlock studio is behind the animation.

== Personal life ==
=== Relationships ===
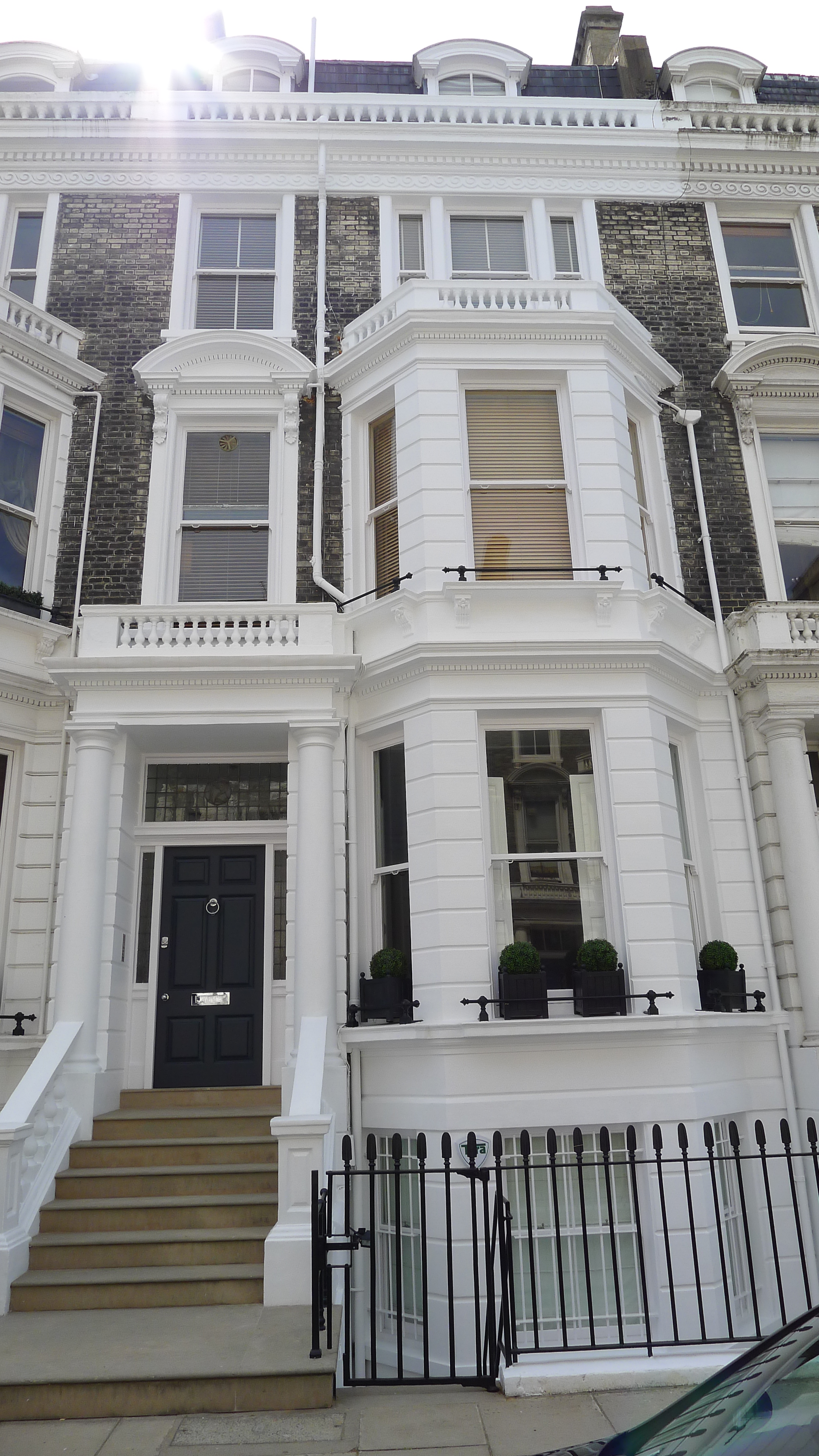
12 Stafford Terrace in Kensington, London, one of Mercury's former homes

In 1969, a year before Queen was formed, Mercury met Mary Austin through Brian May. At the time, Austin was working at the fashion boutique Biba in Kensington, London. Mercury and Austin began a long-term relationship and lived together for several years in West Kensington. By the mid-1970s, Mercury had begun an affair with David Minns, an executive at Elektra Records. After four years of living together, Mercury told Austin he was bisexual. This confession, and her belief that he was gay, contributed to the end of their romantic relationship. (Note: Attributed to multiple references:) Mercury moved out of the flat they shared, and bought Austin a place of her own near his new address of 12 Stafford Terrace, Kensington.

Mercury and Austin remained close friends through the years; Mercury often referred to her as his only true friend. In a 1985 interview, he said of Austin: "All my lovers asked me why they couldn't replace Mary, but it's simply impossible. The only friend I've got is Mary, and I don't want anybody else. To me, she was my common-law wife. To me, it was a marriage. We believe in each other, that's enough for me." Mercury's final home, Garden Lodge, was picked out by Austin. Austin married the painter Piers Cameron and they had two children. Mercury was the godfather of their older son, Richard. In his will, Mercury left his London home to Austin.

From 1979 to 1985, while living in Munich, Mercury was friends with Austrian actress Barbara Valentin, who is featured in the video for "It's a Hard Life", and initially lived together with her and her daughter before moving into his own apartment. In Munich, Mercury was able to escape the media spotlight, drifted in the local gay scene, and had an intense love relationship with German restaurateur Winfried "Winnie" Kirchberger. Mercury also lived temporarily at Kirchberger's apartment and thanked him "for board and lodging" in the liner notes of his 1985 album Mr. Bad Guy. He wore a silver wedding band given to him by Kirchberger. A close friend described him as Mercury's "great love" in Germany.

By 1985, he began another long-term relationship, with Irish-born hairdresser Jim Hutton (1949–2010) whom he referred to as his husband. Mercury described their relationship as one built on solace and understanding, and said that he "honestly couldn't ask for better". Hutton, who tested HIV-positive in 1990, lived with Mercury for the last seven years of his life, nursed him during his illness, and was present at his bedside when he died. Mercury wore a gold wedding band, given to him by Hutton in 1986, until the end of his life. He was cremated with it on. Hutton later relocated from London to the bungalow he and Mercury had built for themselves in Ireland.

=== Alleged daughter ===
According to the 2025 biography Love, Freddie by Lesley-Ann Jones, Mercury fathered a daughter in 1976 following an affair with the wife of a friend, and shared parental responsibilities with the child's mother and her husband. Mercury's alleged daughter approached Jones with journal entries from 17 diaries claimed to be written for her by Mercury, detailing his personal history, and stated that she and Mercury "had a very close and loving relationship from the moment I was born" until his death when she was 15 years old. The claims were first reported in May 2025, ahead of the biography's release, with the alleged daughter referred to in the publication simply as "B".

News outlets reported that very few people knew of her existence, but that Mary Austin and the other members of Queen were supposedly aware. Despite this accusation, Brian May's wife Anita Dobson said she and her husband were sceptical of the overall story and stated that the supposed daughter is someone that "we don't know about", while Austin, who was living with Mercury when the birth supposedly occurred and when he was supposedly writing diaries about it, told The Sunday Times the following month: "I cannot imagine he would have wanted to, or been able to, keep such a joyful event a secret, either from me or other people closest to him [...] I've never known of any child, or of any diaries. If Freddie had indeed had a child without me knowing anything about it, that would be astonishing to me." In January 2026, the death of the supposed daughter was reported at age 48.

=== Friendship with Kenny Everett ===
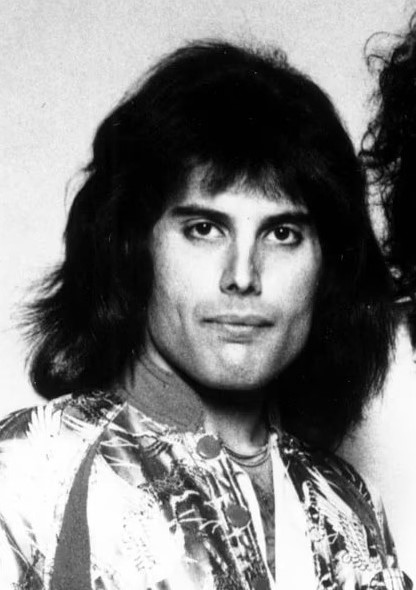
Mercury in 1975

Radio disc jockey Kenny Everett met Mercury in 1974, when he invited the singer onto his Capital London breakfast show. As two of Britain's most flamboyant, outrageous and popular entertainers, they shared much in common and became close friends. In 1975, Mercury visited Everett, bringing with him an advance copy of the single "Bohemian Rhapsody". Despite doubting that any station would play the six-minute track, Everett placed the song on the turntable, and, after hearing it, exclaimed: "Forget it, it's going to be number one for centuries". Although Capital Radio had not officially accepted the song, Everett talked incessantly about a record he possessed but could not play. He then frequently proceeded to play the track with the excuse: "Oops, my finger must've slipped." On one occasion, Everett aired the song fourteen times over a single weekend. Capital's switchboard was overwhelmed with callers inquiring when the song would be released.

During the 1970s, Everett became advisor and mentor to Mercury and Mercury served as Everett's confidant. Throughout the early-to-mid-1980s, they continued to explore their homosexuality and use drugs. Although they were never lovers, they did experience London nightlife together. By 1985, they had fallen out, and their friendship was further strained when Everett was outed in the autobiography of his ex-wife Lee Everett Alkin. In 1989, with their health failing, Mercury and Everett were reconciled; Everett died from AIDS-related illness just over three years after Mercury.

=== Other friendships ===
Mercury saw the stage version of the London musical The Rocky Horror Show at the Royal Court Theatre in Chelsea, and in 1975 went to see the film version, both of which starred Tim Curry. Curry and Mercury became friends, and as a keen horticulturalist Curry later told the UK edition of House and Garden magazine about designing Mercury's garden: "Freddie came back from a tour and said, 'The garden, dear, it's dead.' I said, 'What? Did you water it?' And Freddie said, 'Water it, dear?'" Both Mercury and Curry were also close friends with Peter Straker; Straker, who first met Mercury at a London restaurant in November 1975, was a frequent diner at Mercury's home in Garden Lodge.

Mercury was a long-time friend of Elton John. Shortly before his own death in November 1991, Mercury ordered that a watercolour by John's favourite artist, the 19th-century English impressionist painter Henry Scott Tuke, be given to John on Christmas Day. In a 2021 interview, John recalled: "Here was this beautiful man, dying from AIDS, and in his final days, he had somehow managed to find me a lovely Christmas present".

=== Sexual orientation ===
While some commentators said Mercury hid his sexual orientation from the public, others said he was "openly gay". In December 1974, when asked directly, "So how about being bent?" by the New Musical Express, Mercury replied, "You're a crafty cow. Let's put it this way: there were times when I was young and green. It's a thing schoolboys go through. I've had my share of schoolboy pranks. I'm not going to elaborate further." Homosexual acts between adult males over the age of 21 had been decriminalised in the United Kingdom in 1967. During public events in the 1980s, Mercury often kept a distance from his partner, Jim Hutton.

According to an obituary, Mercury was a "self-confessed bisexual". American magazine The Advocate wrote in May 2018, "Closeted throughout his life, Mercury, who was bisexual, engaged in affairs with men but referred to a woman he loved in his youth, Mary Austin, as 'the love of his life,' according to the biography Somebody to Love: The Life, Death, and Legacy of Freddie Mercury."

Mercury's flamboyant stage performances sometimes led journalists to allude to his sexuality. Dave Dickson, reviewing Queen's performance at Wembley Arena in 1984 for Kerrang!, noted Mercury's "camp" addresses to the audience and even described him as a "posing, pouting, posturing tart". In 1992, John Marshall of Gay Times opined: "[Mercury] was a 'scene-queen,' not afraid to publicly express his gayness, but unwilling to analyse or justify his 'lifestyle' ... It was as if Freddie Mercury was saying to the world, 'I am what I am. So what?' And that in itself for some was a statement." In an article for AfterElton, Robert Urban said: "Mercury did not ally himself to 'political outness,' or to LGBTQ causes."

The creation of Celebrate Bisexuality Day was in part inspired by Mercury. American activist Wendy Curry said: "We were sitting around at one of the annual bi conventions, venting and someone – I think it was Gigi – said we should have a party. We all loved the great bisexual, Freddie Mercury. His birthday was in September, so why not Sept? We wanted a weekend day to ensure the most people would do something. Gigi's birthday was September 23rd. It fell on a weekend day, so, poof! We had a day."

The 2018 biopic of Mercury, Bohemian Rhapsody, received criticism for its portrayal of Mercury's sexuality, which was described as "sterilized" and "confused", and was even accused of being "dangerous".

=== Personality ===
Although he cultivated a flamboyant stage personality, Mercury was shy and retiring when not performing, particularly around people he did not know well, and granted very few interviews. He once said of himself: "When I'm performing I'm an extrovert, yet inside I'm a completely different man." On this contrast to "his larger-than-life stage persona", BBC music broadcaster Bob Harris adds he was "lovely, bright, sensitive, and quite vulnerable". While on stage, Mercury basked in the love from his audience. Nirvana frontman Kurt Cobain's suicide note mentions how he admired and envied the way Mercury "seemed to love, [and] relish in the love and adoration from[,] the crowd".

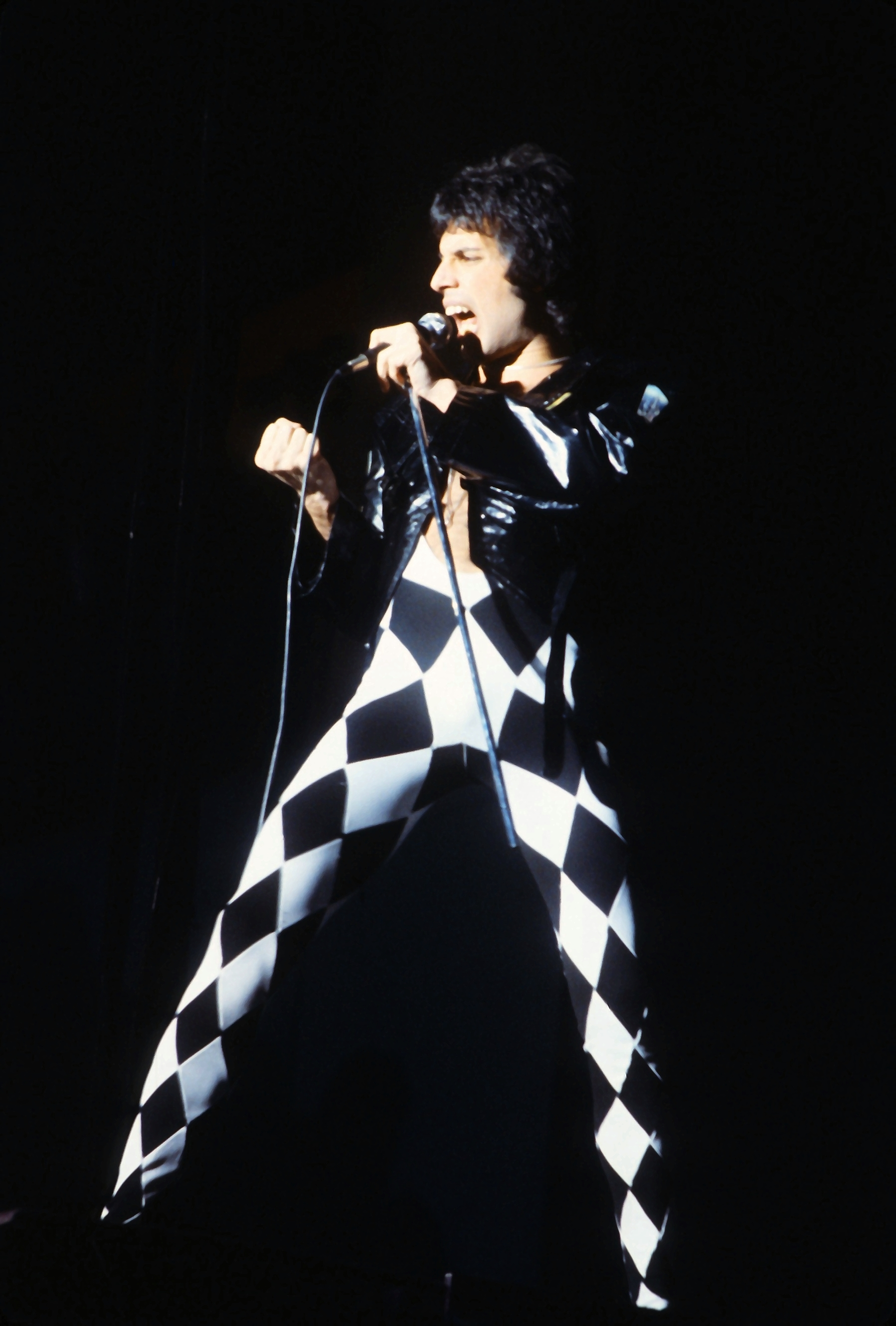
A flamboyant personality on stage, Mercury, pictured wearing a Harlequin outfit in 1977, adopted glam rock aesthetics in the 1970s and collaborated with fashion designer Zandra Rhodes

Mercury never discussed his ethnic or religious background with journalists. The closest he came to doing so was in response to a question about his outlandish persona, he said, "that's something inbred, it's a part of me. I will always walk around like a Persian popinjay", an oblique reference to his Indian Parsi background. Feeling a connection to Britain prior to arriving in England, the young Bulsara was heavily influenced by British fashion and music trends while growing up. According to his longtime assistant Peter Freestone, "if Freddie had his way, he would have been born aged 18 in Feltham." Harris states, "One of the things about Freddie was that he was very civilised and quite 'English'. I'd go over to his flat near Shepherd's Bush in the afternoon, and he'd get out the fine china and the sugar lumps and we'd have a cup of tea." His flamboyant dress sense and the emergence of glam rock in the UK in the early 1970s saw Mercury wear outfits designed by Zandra Rhodes.

When asked by Melody Maker in 1981 if rock stars should use their power to try to shape the world for the better, Mercury responded, "Leave that to the politicians. Certain people can do that kind of thing, but very few. John Lennon was one. Because of his status, he could do that kind of preaching and affect people's thoughts. But to do this you have to have a certain amount of intellect and magic together, and the John Lennons are few and far between. People with mere talent, like me, have not got the ability or power." Mercury dedicated the song "Life Is Real (Song for Lennon)", from the 1982 album Hot Space, to Lennon. Mercury did occasionally express his concerns about the state of the world in his lyrics. His most notable "message" songs are "Under Pressure", "Is This the World We Created...?" (a song which Mercury and May performed at Live Aid, and also featured in Greenpeace – The Album), "There Must Be More to Life Than This", "The Miracle" (a song May called "one of Freddie's most beautiful creations") and "Innuendo". According to the 1998 biography Freddie Mercury: An intimate memoir by the man who knew him best, written by his long-term personal assistant Peter Freestone, Mercury abhorred bands like U2 for using their celebrity status to put over their political views. He was also unaware of Mercury ever voting in any election, but he was always interested in Freestone's voting and the politics at the time. Freestone wrote that Mercury would have favoured a Conservative government if he had voted, due to the 1970s Labour government's high income taxation, but that he never voiced his political opinions as he thought they were "relevant only to the individual".

Mercury cared for at least ten cats throughout his life, including: Tom, Jerry, Oscar, Tiffany, Dorothy, Delilah, Goliath, Miko, Romeo, and Lily. He was against the inbreeding of cats for specific features and all except for Tiffany and Lily, both given as gifts, were adopted from the Blue Cross. Mercury "placed as much importance on these beloved animals as on any human life", and showed his adoration by having the artist Ann Ortman paint portraits of each of them. Mercury wrote a song for Delilah, "his favourite cat of all", which appeared on the Queen album Innuendo. Mercury dedicated his liner notes in his 1985 solo album Mr. Bad Guy to Jerry and his other cats. It reads, "This album is dedicated to my cat Jerry—also Tom, Oscar, and Tiffany and all the cat lovers across the universe—screw everybody else!"

In 1987, Mercury celebrated his 41st birthday at the Pikes Hotel, Ibiza, Spain, several months after discovering that he had contracted HIV. Mercury sought much comfort at the retreat and was a close friend of the owner, Anthony Pike, who described Mercury as "the most beautiful person I've ever met in my life. So entertaining and generous." According to biographer Lesley-Ann Jones, Mercury "felt very much at home there. He played some tennis, lounged by the pool, and ventured out to the odd gay club or bar at night." The birthday party, held on 5 September 1987, has been described as "the most incredible example of excess the Mediterranean island had ever seen", and was attended by some 700 people. A cake in the shape of Antoni Gaudí's Sagrada Família was provided for the party. The original cake collapsed and was replaced with a two-metre-long sponge cake decorated with the notes from Mercury's song "Barcelona". The bill, which included 232 broken glasses, was presented to Queen's manager, Jim Beach. Before his death, Mercury had told Beach, "You can do what you want with my music, but don't make me boring."

== Illness and death ==
Mercury exhibited HIV/AIDS symptoms as early as 1982. Authors Matt Richards and Mark Langthorne have stated in their biographical book about Mercury, Somebody to Love: The Life, Death, and Legacy of Freddie Mercury, that Mercury secretly visited a doctor in New York City to get a white lesion on his tongue checked (which might have been hairy leukoplakia, one of the first signs of an HIV infection) a few weeks before Queen's final American appearance with Mercury on Saturday Night Live on 25 September 1982, where he began to exhibit the symptoms of someone recently infected with HIV.

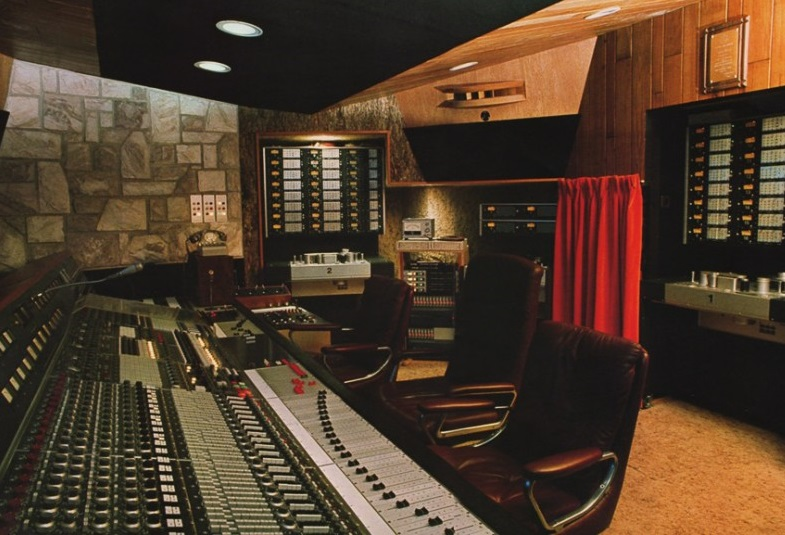
Mountain Studios in Montreux, Switzerland, Queen's recording studio from 1978 to 1995. Mercury recorded his final vocals here in May 1991. In December 2013, the studio was opened free as the "Queen Studio Experience", with fans asked for a donation to the Mercury Phoenix Trust charity.

In October 1986, two months after Mercury's final live performance with Queen at Knebworth House on the Magic Tour, the British tabloid newspapers the News of the World and The Sun reported that he had his blood tested for HIV/AIDS at a Harley Street clinic, but he was quoted as saying he was "perfectly fit and healthy". According to his partner, Jim Hutton, Mercury was diagnosed with AIDS in late April 1987. Around that time, he said in an interview that he had tested negative for HIV. He told his Queen bandmates of his illness in May 1989.

The British press pursued rumours about Mercury's health during the final years of his life, fuelled by his increasingly gaunt appearance, Queen's absence from touring, and reports from his former lovers to tabloid journalists. By 1990, rumours about his health were rife. Mercury and his inner circle of colleagues and friends continually denied the stories. It has been suggested that he could have helped AIDS awareness by speaking earlier about his illness. At the 1990 Brit Awards held at the Dominion Theatre, London, on 18 February, Mercury made his final appearance on stage when he joined the rest of Queen to collect the award for Outstanding Contribution to British Music.

Filmed in May 1991, the music video for "These Are the Days of Our Lives" features a very thin Mercury in his final scenes in front of the camera. The video's director, Rudi Dolezal, said, "AIDS was never a topic. We never discussed it. He didn't want to talk about it. Most of the people didn't even 100 percent know if he had it, apart from the band and a few people in the inner circle. He always said, 'I don't want to put any burden on other people by telling them my tragedy.'" The rest of the band were ready to record when Mercury felt able to come into the studio, for an hour or two at a time. May said of Mercury: "He just kept saying. 'Write me more. Write me stuff. I want to just sing this and do it and when I am gone you can finish it off.' He had no fear, really." Justin Shirley-Smith, the assistant engineer for those last sessions, said: "This is hard to explain to people, but it wasn't sad, it was very happy. He [Freddie] was one of the funniest people I ever encountered. I was laughing most of the time, with him. Freddie was saying [of his illness] 'I'm not going to think about it, I'm going to do this.'"

After the conclusion of his work with Queen in June 1991, Mercury retired to his home in Kensington, West London. His former partner, Mary Austin, was a particular comfort in his final years, and in the last few weeks made regular visits to look after him. Near the end of his life, Mercury began to lose his sight, and declined so that he was unable to leave his bed. Mercury chose to hasten his death by refusing medication and took only painkillers. On 22 November 1991, Mercury called Queen's manager Jim Beach to his Kensington home to prepare a public statement, which was released the following day:

Following the enormous conjecture in the press over the last two weeks, I wish to confirm that I have been tested HIV positive and have AIDS. I felt it correct to keep this information private to date to protect the privacy of those around me. However, the time has come now for my friends and fans around the world to know the truth and I hope that everyone will join with me, my doctors and all those worldwide in the fight against this terrible disease. My privacy has always been very special to me and I am famous for my lack of interviews. Please understand this policy will continue.

=== Death ===
On the evening of 24 November 1991, about 24 hours after issuing the statement, Mercury died at the age of 45 at his home in Kensington. The cause of death was bronchial pneumonia resulting from AIDS. His close friend Dave Clark of the Dave Clark Five was at the bedside vigil when Mercury died. Austin phoned Mercury's parents and sister to break the news, which reached newspaper and television crews in the early hours of 25 November.

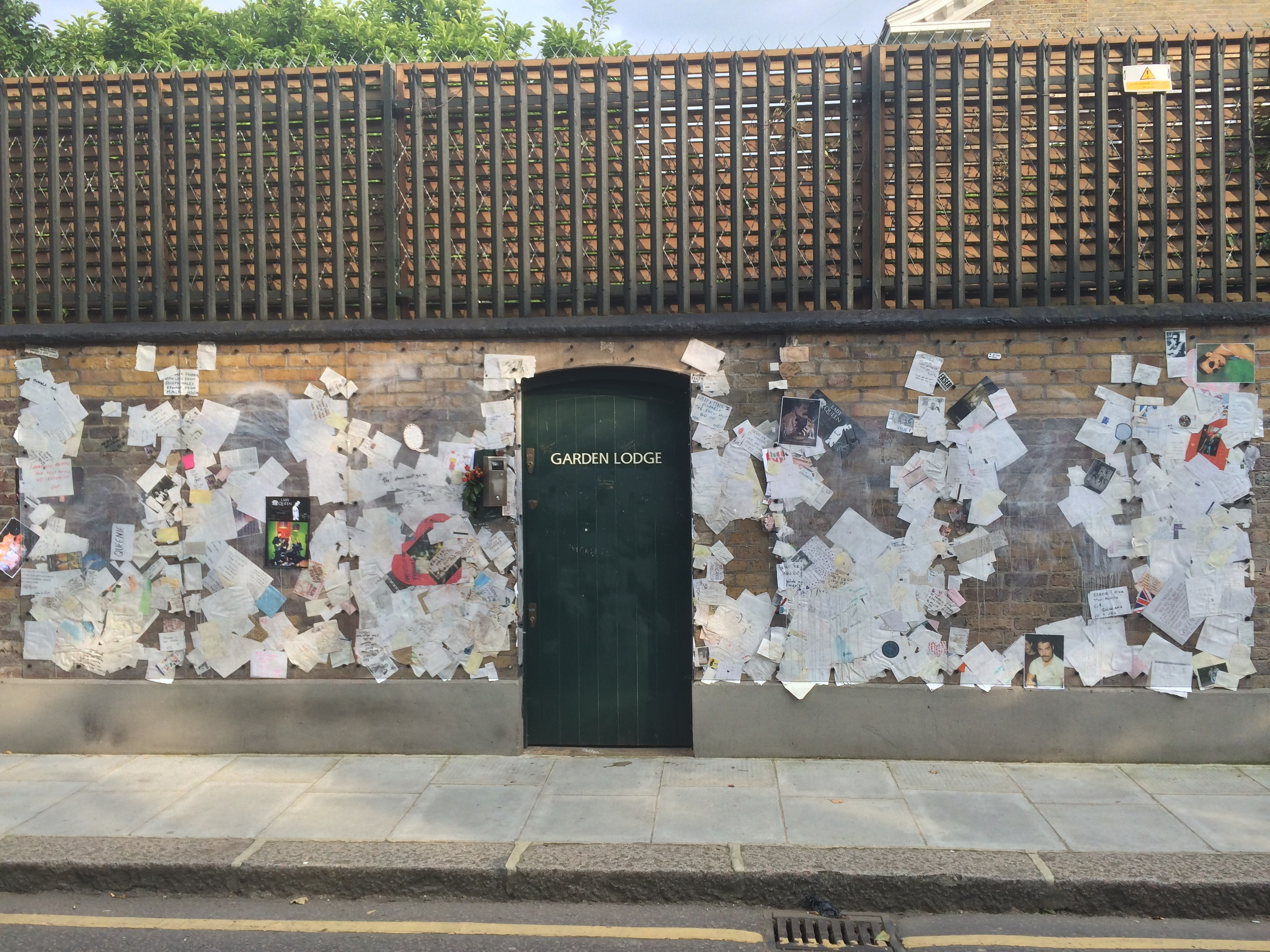
The outer walls of Mercury's final home, Garden Lodge, Logan Place, west London, became a shrine to the late singer.

Mercury's funeral service was conducted on 27 November 1991 by a Zoroastrian priest at West London Crematorium, where he is commemorated by a plinth under his birth name. In attendance at Mercury's service were his family and 35 of his close friends, including Elton John and the members of Queen. His coffin was carried into the chapel to the sounds of "Take My Hand, Precious Lord"/"You've Got a Friend" by Aretha Franklin. In accordance with Mercury's wishes, Mary Austin took possession of his cremated remains and buried them in an undisclosed location. The whereabouts of his ashes are believed to be known only to Austin, who has said that she will never reveal them. However, they are traditionally held by Queen fans to be at Kensal Green Cemetery, where the plinth marks the supposed burial location.

Mercury spent and donated to charity much of his wealth during his lifetime, with his estate valued around £8 million at the time of his death. He bequeathed his home, Garden Lodge, and the adjoining Mews, as well as 50% of all privately owned shares, to Mary Austin. His sister, Kashmira Cooke, received 25%, as did his parents, Bomi and Jer Bulsara, which Cooke acquired upon their deaths. He willed £500,000 to Joe Fannelli; £500,000 to Jim Hutton; £500,000 to Peter Freestone; and £100,000 to Terry Giddings. Mercury, who never drove a car because he had no licence, was often chauffeured around London in his Rolls-Royce Silver Shadow from 1979 until his death. The car was passed to his sister Kashmira who made it available for display at public events, including the West End premiere of the musical We Will Rock You in 2002, before it was auctioned off at the NEC in Birmingham in 2013 for £74,600.

Following his death, the outer walls of Garden Lodge in Logan Place became a shrine to Mercury where mourners paid tributes by covering the walls in graffiti messages. Three years later Time Out magazine reported that "the wall outside the house has become London's biggest rock 'n' roll shrine". Fans continued to visit to pay their respects with letters appearing on the walls until 2017, when Austin had the wall cleared. Hutton was involved in a 2000 biography of Mercury, Freddie Mercury, the Untold Story, and also gave an interview for The Times in September 2006 for what would have been Mercury's 60th birthday.

== Legacy ==
=== Continued popularity ===
The charisma and power in his performance style has over the years led to many artists quoting him as one of their biggest inspirations today. The diverse scope of artists that love Mercury is huge.

— Amy Weller, Gigwise

Regarded as one of the greatest singers in the history of rock music, Mercury was known for his flamboyant stage persona and four-octave vocal range. He defied the conventions of a rock frontman, with his highly theatrical style influencing the artistic direction of Queen.

The extent to which Mercury's death may have enhanced Queen's popularity is not clear. In the United States, where Queen's popularity had lagged in the 1980s, sales of Queen albums went up dramatically in 1992, the year following his death. In 1992, one American critic noted, "What cynics call the 'dead star' factor had come into play—Queen is in the middle of a major resurgence." The movie Wayne's World, which featured "Bohemian Rhapsody", also came out in 1992. According to the Recording Industry Association of America, Queen had sold 34.5 million albums in the United States by 2004, about half of which had been sold since Mercury's death in 1991.

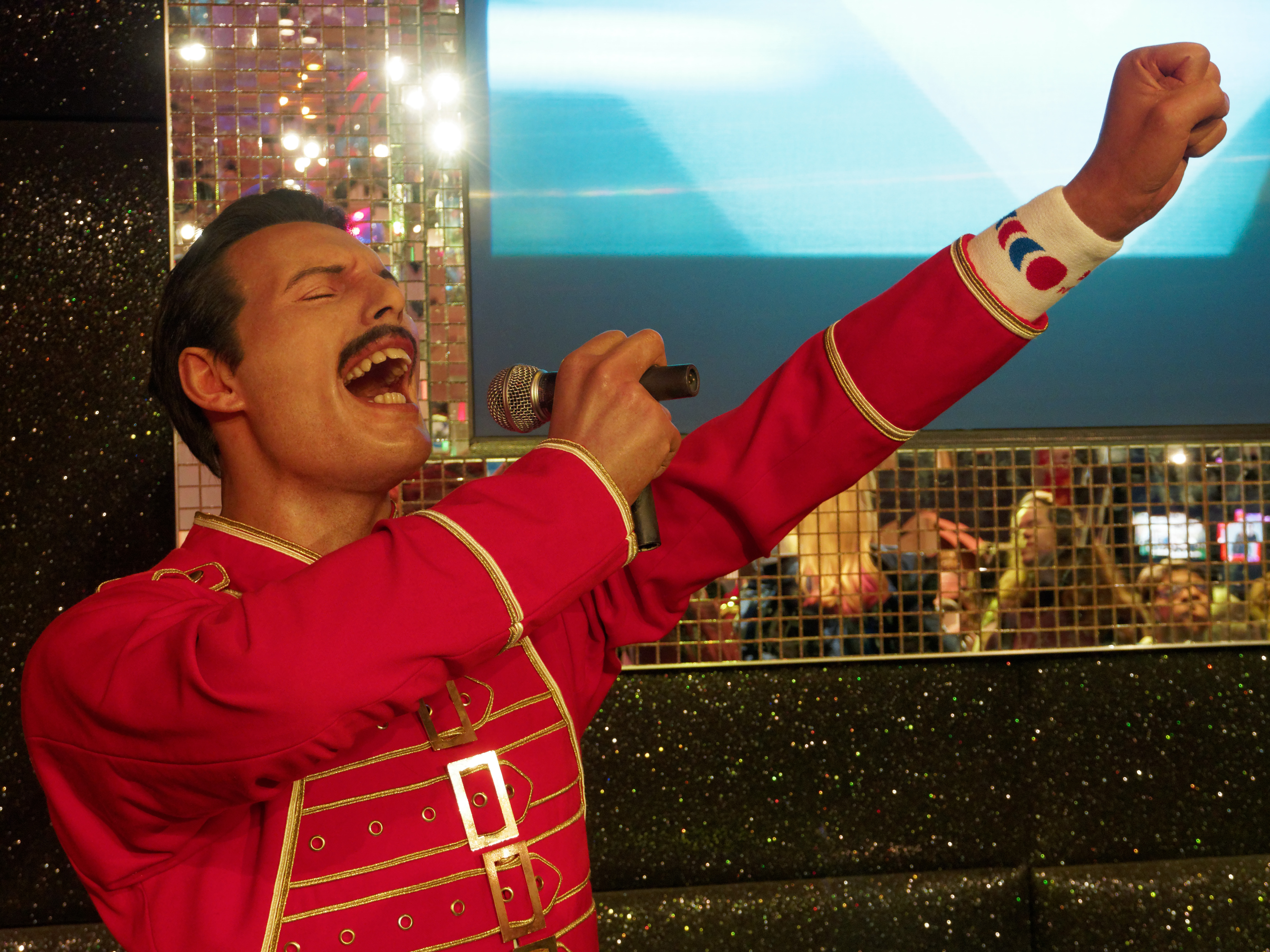
Mercury's wax figure displayed at Madame Tussauds, London

Estimates of Queen's total worldwide record sales to date have been set as high as 300 million. In the United Kingdom, Queen have now spent more collective weeks on the UK Album Charts than any other musical act (including the Beatles), and Queen's Greatest Hits is the best-selling album of all time in the United Kingdom. Two of Mercury's songs, "We Are the Champions" and "Bohemian Rhapsody", have also each been voted as the greatest song of all time in major polls by Sony Ericsson and Guinness World Records. Both songs have been inducted into the Grammy Hall of Fame; "Bohemian Rhapsody" in 2004 and "We Are the Champions" in 2009. In October 2007 the video for "Bohemian Rhapsody" was voted the greatest of all time by readers of Q magazine.

Since his death, Queen were inducted into the Rock and Roll Hall of Fame in 2001, and all four band members were inducted into the Songwriters Hall of Fame in 2003. Their Rock Hall of Fame citation reads, "in the golden era of glam rock and gorgeously hyper-produced theatrical extravaganzas that defined one branch of '70s rock, no group came close in either concept or execution to Queen." The band were among the inaugural inductees into the UK Music Hall of Fame in 2004. Mercury was individually posthumously awarded the Brit Award for Outstanding Contribution to British Music in 1992. They received the Ivor Novello Award for Outstanding Song Collection from the British Academy of Songwriters, Composers, and Authors in 2005, and in 2018 they were presented the Grammy Lifetime Achievement Award. Queen were awarded the Polar Music Prize in 2025, with their citation describing Mercury as "one of the most charismatic front figures in the history of music".

=== Posthumous Queen album ===
In November 1995, Mercury appeared posthumously on Queen's final studio album Made in Heaven. The album featured Mercury's previously unreleased final recordings from 1991, as well as outtakes from previous years and reworked versions of solo works by the other members. The album cover features the Freddie Mercury statue that overlooks Lake Geneva superimposed with Mercury's Duck House lake cabin that he had rented. This is where he had written and recorded his last songs at Mountain Studios. The sleeve of the album contains the words, "Dedicated to the immortal spirit of Freddie Mercury."

Featuring tracks such as "Too Much Love Will Kill You" and "Heaven for Everyone", the album also contains the song "Mother Love", the last vocal recording Mercury made before his death, which he completed using a drum machine, over which May, Taylor, and Deacon later added the instrumental track. After completing the penultimate verse, Mercury had told the band he "wasn't feeling that great" and stated, "I will finish it when I come back next time". He never made it back into the studio, so May later recorded the final verse of the song.

=== Tributes ===
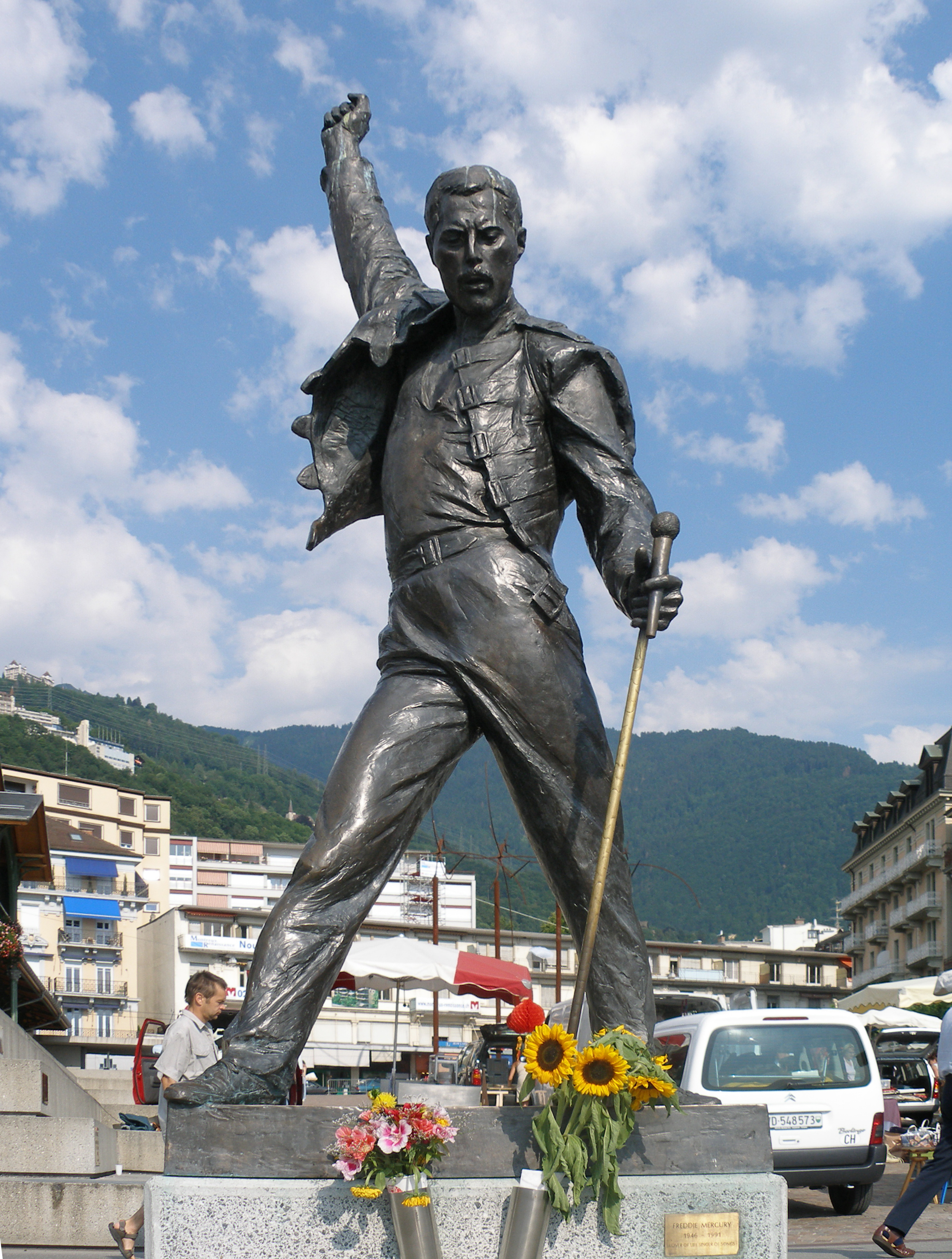
Statue of Freddie Mercury overlooking Lake Geneva in Montreux, Switzerland

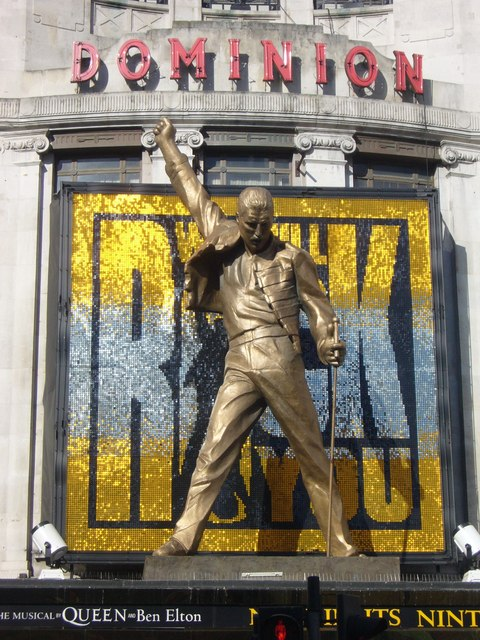
Mercury statue above the West End's Dominion Theatre

A statue in Montreux, Switzerland, by sculptor Irena Sedlecká, was erected as a tribute to Mercury. It stands almost 10 feet (3.0 metres) high overlooking Lake Geneva and was unveiled on 25 November 1996 by Mercury's father and Montserrat Caballé, with bandmates Brian May and Roger Taylor also in attendance. Beginning in 2003 fans from around the world have gathered in Switzerland annually to pay tribute to the singer as part of the "Freddie Mercury Montreux Memorial Day" on the first weekend of September.

In 1997 the three remaining members of Queen released "No-One but You (Only the Good Die Young)", a song dedicated to Mercury and all those that die too soon. In 1999 a Royal Mail stamp with an image of Mercury on stage was issued in his honour as part of the UK postal service's Millennium Stamp series. In 2009 a star commemorating Mercury was unveiled in Feltham, west London where his family moved upon arriving in England in 1964. The star in memory of Mercury's achievements was unveiled on Feltham High Street by his mother Jer Bulsara and Queen bandmate May.

A statue of Mercury stood over the entrance to the Dominion Theatre in London's West End from May 2002 to May 2014 for Queen and Ben Elton's musical We Will Rock You. A tribute to Queen was on display at the Fremont Street Experience in downtown Las Vegas throughout 2009 on its video canopy. In December 2009 a large model of Mercury wearing tartan was displayed in Edinburgh as publicity for the run of We Will Rock You. Sculptures of Mercury often feature him wearing a military jacket with his fist in the air. In 2018, GQ called Mercury's yellow military jacket (created by British costume designer Diana Moseley) from his 1986 concerts his best known look, while CNN called it "an iconic moment in fashion."

For Mercury's 65th birthday in 2011, Google dedicated its Google Doodle to him. It included an animation set to his song, "Don't Stop Me Now". Referring to "the late, great Freddie Mercury" in their 2012 Rock and Roll Hall of Fame induction speech, Guns N' Roses quoted Mercury's lyrics from "We Are the Champions"; "I've taken my bows, my curtain calls, you've brought me fame and fortune and everything that goes with it, and I thank you all."

Tribute was paid to Queen and Mercury at the closing ceremony of the 2012 Summer Olympics in London. The band's performance of "We Will Rock You" with Jessie J was opened with a video of Mercury's "call and response" routine from 1986's Wembley Stadium performance, with the 2012 crowd at the Olympic Stadium responding appropriately. The frog genus Mercurana, discovered in 2013 in Kerala, India, was named as a tribute because Mercury's "vibrant music inspires the authors". The site of the discovery is very near to where Mercury spent most of his childhood. In 2013, a newly discovered species of damselfly from Brazil was named Heteragrion freddiemercuryi, honouring the "superb and gifted musician and songwriter whose wonderful voice and talent still entertain millions" — one of four similar damselflies named after the Queen bandmates, in tribute to Queen's 40th anniversary.

On 1 September 2016, an English Heritage blue plaque was unveiled at Mercury's home in 22 Gladstone Avenue in Feltham, west London by his sister, Kashmira Cooke, and Brian May. Attending the ceremony, Karen Bradley, the UK Secretary of State for Culture, called Mercury "one of Britain's most influential musicians", and added he "is a global icon whose music touched the lives of millions of people around the world". On 24 February 2020 a street in Feltham was renamed Freddie Mercury Close during a ceremony attended by his sister Kashmira. On 5 September 2016, the 70th anniversary of Mercury's birth, asteroid 17473 Freddiemercury was named after him. Issuing the certificate of designation to the "charismatic singer", Joel Parker of the Southwest Research Institute added: "Freddie Mercury sang, 'I'm a shooting star leaping through the sky' — and now that is even more true than ever before." In an April 2019 interview, British rock concert promoter Harvey Goldsmith referred to Mercury as "one of our most treasured talents".

In August 2019, Mercury was one of the honorees inducted in the Rainbow Honor Walk, a walk of fame in San Francisco's Castro District noting LGBTQ people who have "made significant contributions in their fields". Freddie Mercury Alley is a 107-yard-long (98 m) alley next to the British embassy in the Ujazdów district in Warsaw, Poland, which is dedicated to Mercury, and was unveiled on 22 November 2019. Until the Freddie Mercury Close in Feltham was dedicated, Warsaw was the only city in Europe with a street dedicated to the singer. In January 2020, Queen became the first band to join Queen Elizabeth II on a British coin. Issued by the Royal Mint, the commemorative £5 coin features the instruments of all four band members, including Mercury's Bechstein grand piano and his mic and stand. Since 2021, one of the houses where Mercury lived in Stone Town has hosted a Freddie Mercury Museum, which features many photographs and dozens of handwritten song lyrics. In April 2022, a life-size statue of Mercury was unveiled in South Korea's resort island of Jeju. In May 2024, the crater Bulsara on the planet Mercury was named after his birth name.

Mercury has featured in international advertising to represent the UK. In 2001, a parody of Mercury, along with prints of other British music icons consisting of the Beatles, Elton John, Spice Girls, and the Rolling Stones, appeared in the Eurostar national advertising campaign in France for the Paris to London route. In September 2017 the airline Norwegian painted the tail fin of two of its aircraft with a portrait of Mercury to mark what would have been his 71st birthday. Mercury is one of the company's six "British tail fin heroes", alongside England's 1966 FIFA World Cup winning captain Bobby Moore, children's author Roald Dahl, novelist Jane Austen, pioneering pilot Amy Johnson, and aviation entrepreneur Sir Freddie Laker.

=== Importance in AIDS history ===
As the first major rock star to die of AIDS-related complications, Mercury's death represented an important event in the history of the disease. In April 1992, the remaining members of Queen founded The Mercury Phoenix Trust and organised The Freddie Mercury Tribute Concert for AIDS Awareness, to celebrate the life and legacy of Mercury and raise money for AIDS research, which took place on 20 April 1992. The Mercury Phoenix Trust has since raised millions of pounds for various AIDS charities. The tribute concert, which took place at London's Wembley Stadium for an audience of 72,000, featured a wide variety of guests including Robert Plant (of Led Zeppelin), Roger Daltrey (of the Who), Extreme, Elton John, Metallica, David Bowie, Annie Lennox, Tony Iommi (of Black Sabbath), Guns N' Roses, Elizabeth Taylor, George Michael, Def Leppard, Seal and Liza Minnelli, with U2 also appearing via satellite. Elizabeth Taylor spoke of Mercury as "an extraordinary rock star who rushed across our cultural landscape like a comet shooting across the sky". The concert was broadcast live to 76 countries and had an estimated viewing audience of 1 billion people. The Freddie for a Day fundraiser on behalf of the Mercury Phoenix Trust takes place every year in London, with supporters of the charity including Monty Python comedian Eric Idle and Mel B of the Spice Girls.

The documentary Freddie Mercury - The Final Act aired on BBC Two in 2021 and The CW in the US in April 2022. It covered Mercury's last days, how his bandmates and friends put together the tribute concert at Wembley, and interviewed medical professionals, people who tested HIV positive, and others who knew someone who died of AIDS. At the 50th International Emmy Awards in 2022, it won the International Emmy Award for Best Arts Programming.

=== Appearances in lists of influential individuals ===
Several popularity polls conducted over the past decade indicate that Mercury's reputation may have been enhanced since his death. For instance, in a 2002 vote to determine who the UK public considers the greatest British people in history, Mercury was ranked 58 in the list of the 100 Greatest Britons, broadcast by the BBC. He was further listed at the 52nd spot in a 2007 Japanese national survey of the 100 most influential heroes. Although he had been criticised by gay activists for hiding his HIV status, author Paul Russell included Mercury in his book The Gay 100: A Ranking of the Most Influential Gay Men and Lesbians, Past and Present. In 2008, Rolling Stone ranked Mercury 18 on its Top 100 Singers Of All Time. Mercury was voted the greatest male singer in MTV's 22 Greatest Voices in Music. In 2011 a Rolling Stone readers' pick placed Mercury in second place of the magazine's Best Lead Singers of All Time. Billboard magazine placed him second on their 25 Best Rock Frontmen (and Women) of All Time list in 2015, and third on their 50 Greatest Rock Lead Singers of All Time list in 2023. In 2016, LA Weekly ranked him first on the list of 20 greatest singers of all time, in any genre. In 2023, Rolling Stone ranked Mercury at No. 14 on its list of the 200 Greatest Singers of All Time. In 2026, Consequence ranked Mercury the best vocalist of all time.

=== Portrayal on stage ===
On 24 November 1997, a monodrama about Freddie Mercury's life, titled Mercury: The Afterlife and Times of a Rock God, opened in New York City. It presented Mercury in the hereafter: examining his life, seeking redemption and searching for his true self. The play was written and directed by Charles Messina and the part of Mercury was played by Khalid Gonçalves (né Paul Gonçalves) and then later, Amir Darvish. Billy Squier opened one of the shows with an acoustic performance of a song he had written about Mercury titled "I Have Watched You Fly".

In 2016 a musical titled Royal Vauxhall premiered at the Royal Vauxhall Tavern in Vauxhall, London. Written by Desmond O'Connor, the musical told the alleged tales of the nights that Mercury, Kenny Everett and Diana, Princess of Wales spent out at the Royal Vauxhall Tavern in London in the 1980s. Following several successful runs in London, the musical was taken to the Edinburgh Fringe Festival in August 2016 starring Tom Giles as Mercury.

=== Portrayal in film and television ===
The 2018 biographical film Bohemian Rhapsody was, at its release, the highest-grossing musical biographical film of all time. Mercury was portrayed by Rami Malek, whose performance earned him the Academy Award, BAFTA Award, Golden Globe Award and Screen Actors Guild Award for Best Actor. While the film received mixed reviews and contained historical inaccuracies, it won the Golden Globe for Best Motion Picture – Drama.

Mercury appeared as a supporting character in the BBC television drama Best Possible Taste: The Kenny Everett Story, first broadcast in October 2012. He was portrayed by actor James Floyd. He was played by actor John Blunt in The Freddie Mercury Story: Who Wants to Live Forever, first broadcast in the UK on Channel 5 in November 2016. Although the programme was criticised for focusing on Mercury's love life and sexuality, Blunt's performance and likeness to the singer did receive praise.

In 2018, David Avery portrayed Mercury in the Urban Myths comedy series in an episode focusing on the antics backstage at Live Aid, and Kayvan Novak portrayed Mercury in an episode titled "The Sex Pistols vs. Bill Grundy". He was also portrayed by Eric McCormack (as the character Will Truman) on Will & Grace in the October 2018 episode titled "Tex and the City".

=== Auction ===
From 4 August to 5 September 2023, an exhibition titled, Freddie Mercury: A World of His Own, saw almost 1,500 items of Mercury's, which he had given to his former partner Mary Austin, displayed at Sotheby's in New Bond Street, London before being sold across six auctions. Nearly 140,000 fans visited the exhibition, which Sotheby's had called "the life and work of Britain's greatest rock showman of the 20th century".

A Yamaha baby grand piano used by Mercury to compose many of the band's hits, including "Bohemian Rhapsody", sold for £1.7 million, while his handwritten lyrics for the song went for £1.38 million. The door of his Garden Lodge home in west London, covered in graffiti left by fans, went for £412,750. The crown and cloak designed by Diana Moseley for the 1986 Magic tour (his final concerts) sold for £635,000. A pair of black striped Adidas high-top shoes (his principal stage footwear from 1984 onward) sold for £127,000. The final evening sale at Sotheby's on 6 September took in £12.2 million ($15.4 million), while the six sales in total reached £39.9 million ($50.4 million), smashing Sotheby's pre-auction estimates.

== Discography ==
=== Solo ===
Studio albums

- Mr. Bad Guy (1985)
- Barcelona (with Montserrat Caballé) (1988)

=== Queen ===
Studio albums

- Queen (1973)
- Queen II (1974)
- Sheer Heart Attack (1974)
- A Night at the Opera (1975)
- A Day at the Races (1976)
- News of the World (1977)
- Jazz (1978)
- The Game (1980)
- Flash Gordon (1980)
- Hot Space (1982)
- The Works (1984)
- A Kind of Magic (1986)
- The Miracle (1989)
- Innuendo (1991)
- Made in Heaven (1995)

== Cited sources ==
- Blake, Mark (2016). Freddie Mercury: A Kind of Magic. Omnibus Press. ISBN 978-1-783-23778-4.
- Bret, David (1996), Living On the Edge: The Freddie Mercury Story, London: Robson Books, ISBN 978-1-86105-256-8
- Jones, Lesley-Ann (2011), Freddie Mercury: The Definitive Biography, London: Hachette UK, ISBN 9781444733709
- Rees, Dafydd; Crampton, Luke (1999), Summers, David (ed.), The Rock Stars Encyclopedia, London: Dorling Kindersley, ISBN 978-0789446138
