= Peter Wilson (auctioneer) =

English chair of Sotheby's (1913–1984)

Peter Cecil Wilson CBE (8 March 1913 – 3 June 1984) was an English auctioneer and chairman of Sotheby's.

Wilson's father was Sir Mathew Wilson, 4th Baronet of Eshton Hall, Gargrave, Yorkshire. He was educated at Eton College and at New College, Oxford. He married Helen Ballard in 1935 who he had met in Hamburg. They had two sons and she became a noted horticulturist after he became attracted to men. The marriage was dissolved in 1951 and they remained on good terms.

He worked for British Intelligence during World War II, in London and Washington DC. He thought about taking this up as a career but decided to return to "Sotherbys" after the war.

He appeared as a castaway on the BBC Radio programme Desert Island Discs on 26 September 1966.

He was made a Commander of the Order of the British Empire in 1970, and was made honorary life president of Sotheby's in 1980, when he stood down as chairman. Wilson owned Garden Lodge at Logan Place in London's Kensington district for several years.

He died in Paris in 1984, after being in a coma for a week. He was 71.

Wilson is mentioned in the Ian Fleming story "The Property of a Lady", commissioned by Sotheby's for use in their annual journal, The Ivory Hammer.
