= The Rolling Stones: An Illustrated Record =

1976 book by Roy Carr

- First edition
- Author: Roy Carr
- Language: English
- Genre: Non-fiction
- Publication date: 1976
- ISBN: 978-0-517-52641-5

The Rolling Stones: An Illustrated Record is a 1976 book by music journalist Roy Carr, published by Harmony Books.

The book contains an extensive discography of record releases by the Rolling Stones up to that time (the latest being Black and Blue), with critical reviews of each release by Carr. Sidebars give a concurrent history of the band, with press clippings, quotes, and photos from each phase of the Stones’ career, including their (at that time) infrequent solo activities. The book follows the British releases of the Rolling Stones’ records, including ABKCO’s notoriously ill conceived series of repackages after the band left Decca for Atlantic in 1970. The final section of the book includes a United States discography as well as a brief overview of bootleg Stones recordings released by that time.
