= Lesley-Ann Jones =

English writer

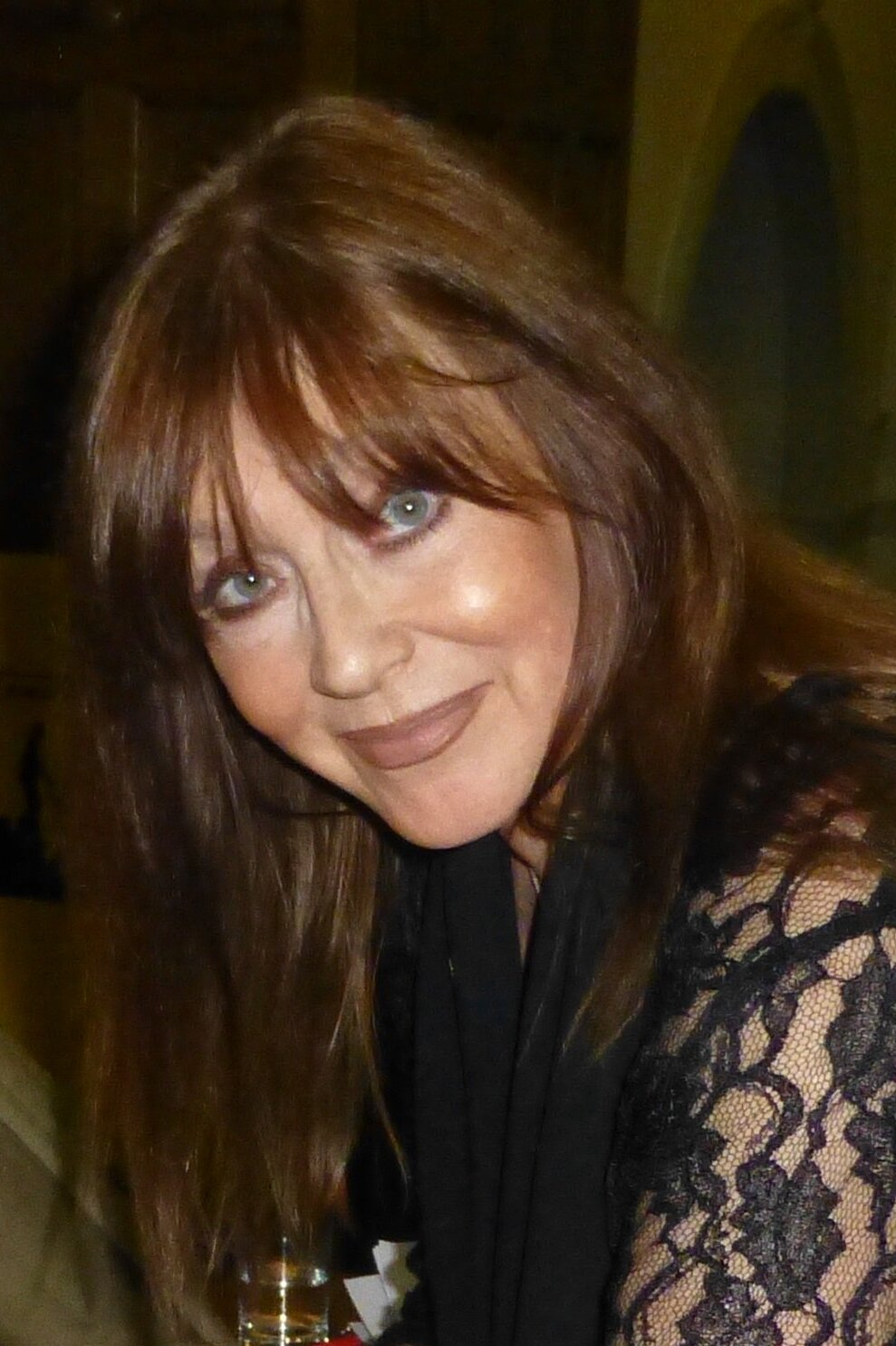
- Jones in 2018
- Born: Kent, England
- Occupation: Author
- Children: 3
- Writing career
- Language: English
- Website: www.lesleyannjones.com

Lesley-Ann Jones is a British author, journalist and broadcaster who spent more than 20 years as a national newspaper journalist on Fleet Street.

== Early life ==
Jones was born in Kent, England, the daughter of sports reporter Ken Jones, and her uncle is former Wales footballer Cliff Jones. She is of Welsh descent. She read French and Spanish at the University of Westminster, and worked in the music industry before moving to journalism.

== Career ==
In the 1980s, Jones worked for Chrysalis Records, London, where she wrote sleeve notes, prepared press releases and organised interviews for the national press. She moved into television at the inception of Channel 4. The prime-time Saturday-night pop-music magazine series Ear Say, which she co-presented with Capital Radio DJs Nicky Horne and Gary Crowley, led to guest appearances on a variety of TV and radio shows, including Capital's You Ain’t Heard Nothing Yet, a weekly music quiz produced by pop guru Phil Swern, and Radio Clyde’s Bill Padley Show, with Padley and singer/songwriter Jim Diamond.

Jones also wrote a weekly column for The Sun. She spent six years as a showbusiness feature-writer for the Daily Mail, Mail On Sunday and You magazine, touring with Paul McCartney, David Bowie, the Rolling Stones, Elton John, Queen, and other star acts of the day.

As a freelance feature writer, her contributions to publications in the UK, US, Australia and Europe included interviews with Tony Blair, Frank Sinatra, Raquel Welch, Mel Gibson, Charlton Heston, Paul McCartney, Brigitte Bardot and Princess Margaret. She appeared weekly for several years on BFBS Forces Radio with Tommy Vance, and worked on documentaries on Stevie Nicks, Ken Russell and Jermaine Jackson. The Pampers nappies commercial she filmed with her baby daughter for Saatchi & Saatchi was aired across Europe for 18 months.

Following three years writing columns and features for the Sunday Express and the Mail on Sunday, she revised and updated her 1997 biography of Queen frontman Freddie Mercury. Republication by Hodder & Stoughton in October 2011 (paperback 2012) was due to coincide with the release of a Mercury biopic to commemorate the 21st anniversary of his death. Production of the film was delayed, and it was not released until 2018.

In 2025, she published a book alleging that Mercury had a secret daughter, born in the 1970s.

In 2010, Jones was appointed Showbusiness Editor for SKY/Freesat's music channel Vintage TV. She wrote and presented their celebrity interview series Me & Mrs Jones, produced by Transparent Television.

In December 2015, Jones wrote and co-produced The Last Lennon Interview for ShowBiz TV. It was first aired on the 35th anniversary of John Lennon’s death.

== Personal life ==
Jones lives in London and Kent. She has a son and two daughters.

== Published works ==
- Love, Freddie: Freddie Mercury's Secret Life and Love (biography, Whitefox Publishing, 2025)
- Songbird: An Intimate Biography of Fleetwood Mac's Christine McVie (biography, John Blake/Bonnier Books, 2024)
- Fly Away Paul: How Paul McCartney survived the Beatles and found his Wings (biography, Coronet, 2023)
- The Stone Age: Sixty Years of the Rolling Stones (biography, John Blake/Bonnier Books, 2022)
- Love of My Life: The Life and Loves of Freddie Mercury (biography, Coronet, 2021)
- Who Killed John Lennon?: The Life, Loves And Deaths of The Greatest Rock Star (biography, John Blake, 2020)
- Tumbling Dice (memoir, Independently Published, 2019)
- Bohemian Rhapsody: The Definitive Biography of Freddie Mercury (biography, Hodder & Stoughton, 2018)
- Hero: David Bowie (biography, Hodder & Stoughton, 2016)
- Imagine (fiction, Mulcahy Books, 2015)
- Ride A White Swan: The Lives And Death Of Marc Bolan (Hodder & Stoughton, 2012)
- Freddie Mercury: The Definitive Biography (rewrite, biography, Hodder & Stoughton, 2011)
- Freddie Mercury: The Definitive Biography (biography, Hodder and Stoughton, 1997)
- Excuses, Excuses with Gray Jolliffe (humour, Kyle Cathie, 1996)
- Wow! with Caris Davis (fiction, Mainstream under the pseudonym Amy Auden, 1994 )
- Naomi: The Rise and Rise of the Girl from Nowhere (biography, Vermilion, 1993)
- Kylie Minogue: The Superstar Next Door (biography, Omnibus Press/Media Business International, 1990)
- The Sony Tape Rock Review (review, Rambletree, compiled and edited by Robin Eggar, Phil Swern & Lesley-Ann Jones)
