= Mercury Phoenix Trust =

HIV/AIDS charity in the United Kingdom

The Mercury Phoenix Trust
- Named after: Freddie Mercury
- Formation: April 1992; 34 years ago
- Owner: Brian May; Roger Taylor; Jim Beach; Mary Austin
- Website: mercuryphoenixtrust.org

The Mercury Phoenix Trust is a charity organisation that fights HIV/AIDS worldwide.

After the death of Queen singer Freddie Mercury from AIDS-related causes in London in 1991, the remaining members of the band and Jim Beach, their manager, organised The Freddie Mercury Tribute Concert for AIDS Awareness, the proceeds of which were used to launch The Mercury Phoenix Trust. The organisation has been active ever since.

The trustees as of 2022 are: Brian May, Roger Taylor, Jim Beach, and Mercury's former fiance Mary Austin.
