= I Want to Break Free =

1984 single by Queen

- Artwork for UK release

Single by Queen

from the album The Works
- B-side: "Machines (or 'Back to Humans')"
- Released: 2 April 1984
- Recorded: 1983
- Genre: Synth-pop; dance-pop; pop rock
- Length: 3:19 (album version); 3:43 (soundtrack version); 4:18 (single version); 7:14 (12" extended version)
- Label: EMI (UK); Capitol (US)
- Songwriter: John Deacon
- Producers: Queen; Reinhold Mack

Queen singles chronology
"Radio Ga Ga" (1984)	"I Want to Break Free" (1984)	"It's a Hard Life" (1984)

Audio sample
- file; help

Music video
- "I Want to Break Free" on YouTube

"I Want to Break Free" is a song by the British rock band Queen, written by their bassist John Deacon. It appears on the album The Works (1984), and was released in three versions: album, single and extended. The track became a staple of the band's 1984–85 Works Tour and their 1986 Magic Tour.

The song is largely known for its music video for which all the band members dressed in drag, a concept proposed by drummer Roger Taylor, which parodied the long-running ITV soap opera Coronation Street. The second part of the video included a composition rehearsed and performed with the Royal Ballet and choreographed by Wayne Eagling. Whereas the parody was acclaimed in the United Kingdom, where cross-dressing is a popular trope in British comedy, it caused controversy in the United States.

After its release in 1984, the song was well received in Europe and South America and is regarded as an anthem of the fight against oppression. The single reached number 45 on the US Billboard Hot 100 and number three in the UK, and was certified double platinum with over 1,200,000 copies sold. It also topped the charts of Austria, Belgium, and the Netherlands. The song features on the band's compilation album, Greatest Hits II.

== Composition and background ==
Deacon said that "I Want to Break Free" was inspired by the women's liberation movement. It was written in 1983 and released in April 1984. Most of the song follows a traditional 12 bar blues progression in E major. It has three verses with one bridge, no chorus, and relatively little section repetition.

The song features session musician Fred Mandel, who plays all of the keyboard parts; he was involved with the song when it featured only a drum machine and a guitar part. The keyboard solo was done in one take on a Roland Jupiter-8 synthesizer, except the last note with a portamento down one octave, which was captured via punching in.

Besides the album version, a single version and an extended version were released.

The single version lasts 4 minutes 21 seconds and differs from the album version by the 40-second introduction and a longer synthesizer solo which starts at 2:33. The introduction is played on an electronic keyboard and is assisted by cymbals, drums and a guitar (Red Special). For the Bohemian Rhapsody soundtrack, the single introduction is added to the album version, creating a 3 minutes 43 seconds edit.

The extended version lasts 7 minutes 16 seconds and features a longer introduction and ending. It lasts until 6:04, and the remaining minute contains fragments of other songs from The Works. (Note: In order of appearance: "Radio Ga Ga", "It's a Hard Life", "Man on the Prowl", "Machines (Or 'Back to Humans')", "Keep Passing the Open Windows", "Hammer to Fall", "Tear It Up", "Is This the World We Created...?") The extended version was mostly distributed as 12-inch vinyl records and then reissued on the CD of The Works in 1991.

Besides The Works, the song was featured on the albums Greatest Hits II, Box of Tricks, the 1992 US "Red" Greatest Hits and Absolute Greatest, as well as on the box sets The Complete Works and The Platinum Collection.

== Distribution ==
The song became the second single from the album The Works, after "Radio Ga Ga". The single was released on 2 April 1984 on 7-inch and 12-inch records and later as 3-inch and 5-inch CDs.

The 7-inch records were distributed in 16 countries. In most countries, the A-side features the extended version of "I Want to Break Free" while the B-side contains the album version of the song "Machines (or 'Back to Humans')". The US and Canadian releases feature an instrumental version of "Machines" as the B-side, while Brazil features "It's a Hard Life". In Argentina, the song was released as "Quiero Ser Libre".

The UK 3-inch CD single features "I Want to Break Free" (album version), "Machines" and "It's a Hard Life". In Germany, the 5-inch CD single contains "I Want to Break Free" and "It's a Hard Life", as well as the video of "I Want to Break Free".

Single covers feature pictures of the group from the cover of the album The Works. In countries where the single went in four different versions, each version has a picture of one Queen member, otherwise four images were placed together. The inscription "Queen. I Want to Break Free" is red, white, gold or black and the frame is red or white. The German 5-inch CD uses the cover for the "Radio Ga Ga" single. The reverse side is the same – a photo of the group on a red background, except for CDs which had a white background and no pictures.

== Critical reception ==
Upon its release, Paddy McAloon of Prefab Sprout, as guest reviewer for Record Mirror, predicted that "I Want to Break Free" would be a hit and considered Queen to be "trying to reach for 'Every Breath You Take' type of territory" with the "kind of song that's supposed to be very simple and will appeal to everyone". Dante Bonutto, writing for Kerrang!, noted how the "gently swaying, stealthily advancing, airplayable single" was "yet another keyboards-based offering" from Queen and one with "not too much in the way of balls". Tom Hibbert of Smash Hits was critical in his review, writing, "After the masterly pop construction of 'Radio Ga Ga' comes a big, fat dud: an unfinished song (loosely borrowed from Shirley Bassey's ancient hit 'What Now My Love'), an absurd guitar solo and half-hearted performances from all bar Freddie." Debbi Voller of Number One was also negative, describing it as "ridiculously inferior" and added that it has "none of the strength" of "Radio Ga Ga'".

In the US, Cash Box commented on the song's "catchy refrain", an "R&B tempo that gives it a back beat of extra zing" and Mercury's "scorching vocals". They concluded that it was a "strong follow-up" to "Radio Ga Ga" with "all the elements of a Queen smash single". Billboard stated, "A Latin rhythm base and Mercury's passionate singing give this ambivalent love song its raw emotional appeal."

== Chart performance ==
The single was received very positively over most of the world except for North America. In April 1984, it peaked at number three in the United Kingdom, and reached the top 10 in many European and Latin American countries, but only peaked at number 45 on the US charts. The single was certified double platinum in the UK. MTV and some other US stations' minimal airing of the video played a role in the low US ranking. The video was included in 1991 on VH1's My Generation two-part episode devoted to Queen hosted by guitarist Brian May. According to May in an interview about Queen's Greatest Hits, whereas the video was understood and taken as a joke in the UK, the US audience failed to see the soap-opera connection and might have interpreted the video as an open declaration of transvestism and Mercury's bisexuality.

In some other countries, such as South Africa and in South America, the song was highly praised because it was seen as an anthem of the fight against oppression, whereas the reaction to the video was mixed.

== Live performances ==
After the release of The Works, the song was performed at almost all of Queen's live concerts. Live recordings of the song appeared on the concert albums Live Magic, Live at Wembley '86 and Return of the Champions. In addition, the song was performed at several concerts which were then included in Queen's videos such as Queen at Wembley, We Are the Champions: Final Live in Japan, The Freddie Mercury Tribute Concert, Hungarian Rhapsody: Queen Live in Budapest and Return of the Champions.

Lisa Stansfield led the song in The Freddie Mercury Tribute Concert; Extreme also performed the song as part of a Queen medley earlier in the concert. The song was also performed in many concerts of the project Queen + Paul Rodgers, where Paul Rodgers took vocals, Danny Miranda played bass guitar and Spike Edney played keyboard.

== Music video ==
The musicians dressed as female characters from Coronation Street. Left to right: Roger Taylor (as Suzie Birchall), Brian May (Hilda Ogden), Freddie Mercury (Bet Lynch) and John Deacon (Ena Sharples).

Following in the tradition of cross-dressing in British comedy, the music video for "I Want to Break Free" sees the members of Queen in a suburban house dressed as women, a parody of the characters from the ITV soap opera Coronation Street.

The video opens with a scene of typical British residential streets in the morning, intercut with shots of a teasmade waking Brian May's character up. The terraced houses are located in Leeds, in the neighbourhood Harehills. The roof of a terrace, most likely between Sandhurst Terrace and Dorset Road, can be seen in the opening shot. In the second scene, the camera pans along a terrace and stops at the house where the action supposedly happens. It is located on 41 Dorset Mount in real life and has a slightly different floor plan than the set used in the video. A part of the Dorset Mount street name plate can be seen on its wall just a second before Brian May gets out of bed.

Mercury vacuums the floor and sings the first verse. He opens a door leading to a dark space, where the group appear surrounded by figures wearing miner's helmets. Mercury dances to a glowing box and reappears with several dancers dressed in spotted leotards, and performs a dance. In the house, Mercury sings and goes upstairs. The group appear in the dark space again.

=== Production ===
The "I Want to Break Free" music video was directed by David Mallet. It was shot on 22 March and 4 May 1984 at Limehouse Studios.

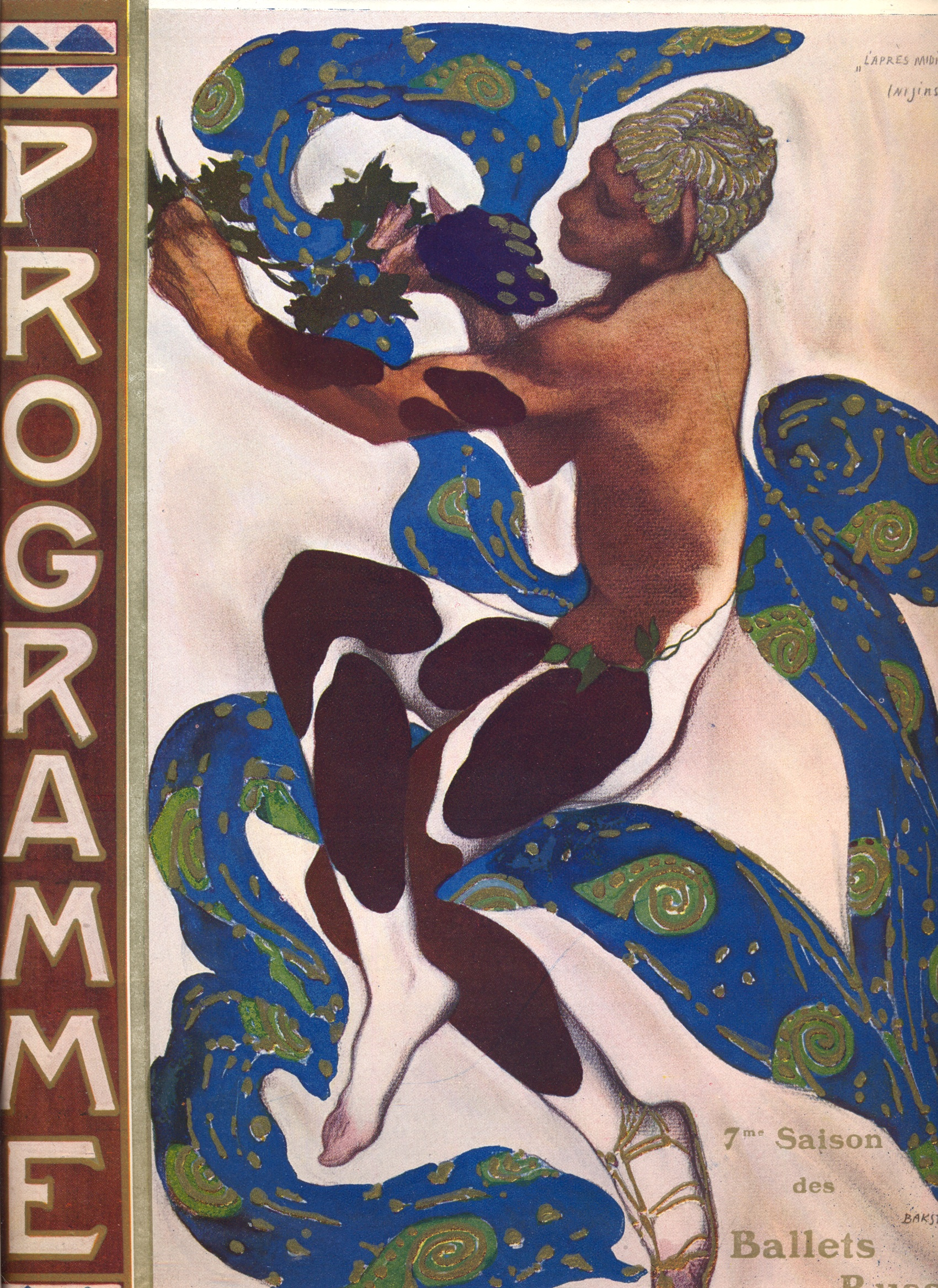
Poster depicting Nijinsky in costume for L'après-midi d'un faune, the inspiration for the central section of the video.

The Coronation Street spoof was "suggested by Taylor's then-girlfriend Dominique". Recounts Roger Taylor: "We had done some really serious, epic videos in the past, and we just thought we'd have some fun. We wanted people to know that we didn't take ourselves too seriously, that we could still laugh at ourselves. I think we proved that." "I thought what character to make Fred? And I thought Liverpudlian slag is the answer".

Mercury's character was loosely based on Coronation Street barmaid Bet Lynch, who wants to "break free" from her life. Although Lynch was a blonde, Mercury thought he would look too silly as a blonde and chose a dark wig. He wears a black wig, pink earrings, a tight-fitting sleeveless pink top with sizable false breasts (with black bra straps showing), black leather miniskirt, thigh-high black stockings, and high-heeled shoes. No attempt was made to disguise Mercury's then-trademark moustache, adding further to the comical effect. During rehearsals, Mercury realised that he could not walk freely in very high heels and settled on 2-inch ones. May plays a more dowdy housewife, with rollers in his hair, based loosely on Hilda Ogden. Deacon appears as a conservative old "grandma", while Taylor plays a schoolgirl with long blonde hair who, like Mercury's character, wants a different life.

The composition was choreographed by Wayne Eagling, a friend of Mercury who had helped him with the choreography of "Bohemian Rhapsody". Eagling was then a leader of the Royal Ballet which was involved in the video. Mercury shaved his moustache in reference to Vaslav Nijinsky as the faun in the ballet L'après-midi d'un faune. The shooting took much practice, especially the conveyor rolling part. According to Eagling, despite being a natural performer on stage, Mercury could not stand performing any choreographed act himself, which is why he was mostly picked up and moved around in the ballet part of the video. The rehearsals with the Royal Ballet were organised by Eagling secretly from his superiors, something that placed him in serious trouble when discovered later.

== Track listings ==
7" single

- A side. "I Want to Break Free" (single version) – 4:18
- B side. "Machines (or 'Back to Humans')" – 5:07

12" single

- A side. "I Want to Break Free" (extended version) – 7:14
- B side. "Machines (or 'Back to Humans')" – 5:07

== Personnel ==
=== Queen ===
- Freddie Mercury – lead and backing vocals
- Brian May – lead guitars
- John Deacon – rhythm guitars, bass
- Roger Taylor – drum machine

=== Additional musicians ===
- Fred Mandel – synthesizers

=== Technical ===
- Reinhold Mack – recording engineer
- Mike Beiriger – additional recording engineer
- Eddie DeLena – assistant recording engineer
- Stefan Wissnet – assistant recording engineer

== Charts ==
=== Weekly charts ===
Weekly chart performance for "I Want to Break Free"
Chart (1984)	Peak position
Australia (Kent Music Report)	8
Austria (Ö3 Austria Top 40)	1
Belgium (Ultratop 50 Flanders)	1
Canada Top Singles (RPM)	26
Europe (European Top 100 Singles)	3
France (SNEP)	9
Ireland (IRMA)	2
New Zealand (Recorded Music NZ)	6
Netherlands (Dutch Top 40)	1
Netherlands (Single Top 100)	1
South Africa (Springbok Radio)	1
Spain (AFYVE)	5
Switzerland (Schweizer Hitparade)	2
UK Singles (Official Charts)	3
US Billboard Hot 100	45
US Dance Club Songs (Billboard)	51
West Germany (GfK)	4

2018–2019 weekly chart performance for "I Want to Break Free"
Chart (2018–2019)	Peak position
Canada (Hot Canadian Digital Songs)	33
Hungary (Single Top 40)	18
Italy (FIMI)	90
Poland Airplay (ZPAV)	59
Portugal (AFP)	94
Sweden Heatseeker (Sverigetopplistan)	11
US Hot Rock & Alternative Songs (Billboard)	16

=== Year-end charts ===
1984 year-end chart performance for "I Want to Break Free"
Chart (1984)	Position
Australia (Kent Music Report)	36
Austria (Ö3 Austria Top 40)	4
Belgium (Ultratop)	14
Netherlands (Dutch Top 40)	13
Netherlands (Single Top 100)	9
New Zealand (RIANZ)	25
South Africa (Springbok Radio)	3
Switzerland (Schweizer Hitparade)	7
UK Singles (OCC)	23
West Germany (Media Control)	32

2019 year-end chart performance for "I Want to Break Free"
Chart (2019)	Position
US Hot Rock Songs (Billboard)	50

== Certifications ==
Certifications for "I Want to Break Free"
Region	Certification	Certified units/sales
Brazil (Pro-Música Brasil)	2× Platinum	120,000^{‡}
Denmark (IFPI Danmark)	Platinum	90,000^{‡}
Germany (BVMI)	Platinum	500,000^{‡}
Italy (FIMI)	2× Platinum	200,000^{‡}
New Zealand (RMNZ)	4× Platinum	120,000^{‡}
Spain (Promusicae)	3× Platinum	180,000^{‡}
United Kingdom (BPI)	2× Platinum	1,200,000^{‡}
United States (RIAA)	Platinum	1,000,000^{‡}
^{‡} Sales+streaming figures based on certification alone.

== Bibliography ==
- Freestone, Peter; Evans, David (2001). Freddie Mercury: An Intimate Memoir by the Man who Knew Him Best. Omnibus Press. ISBN 978-0-7119-8674-9.
- Sky, Rick (1994). The show must go on: the life of Freddie Mercury. Carol Pub. Group. ISBN 0-8065-1506-6.
- Sutcliffe, Phil; Hince, Peter; Mack, Reinhold (15 November 2009). Queen: The Ultimate Illustrated History of the Crown Kings of Rock. MBI Publishing Company. ISBN 978-0-7603-3719-6.
