= We Are the Champions: Final Live in Japan =

- Starring: Freddie Mercury; Brian May; Roger Taylor; John Deacon; Spike Edney
- Music by: Queen
- Release date: September 1992
- Running time: 90 min

We Are the Champions: Final Live in Japan is a live concert video of British rock band Queen's performance at the Yoyogi National Gymnasium, Tokyo on 11 May 1985 as part of the Japanese leg of The Works Tour.

The film's title is inaccurate, as Queen actually performed two more shows in Japan (in Nagoya on 13 May, and in Osaka on the 15th). However, this was the band's final show in Tokyo. The 90-minute film is not the full concert, leaving out Brian May's guitar solo, the Brighton Rock finale and Dragon Attack. The video is also edited for time by cutting away setup waits between songs.

Only officially released in Japan, it first appeared as a video release in 1992, then as a laserdisc and VHS release, before a DVD release in 2004 with new artwork. It was also re-released on Blu-ray in 2018. The video mix has the guitar track lowered in volume, with the synth playing at a louder volume.

== Track List ==
1. Machines (Or 'Back to Humans') (Intro) (May, Taylor)
2. Tear It Up (Brian May)
3. Tie Your Mother Down (May)
4. Under Pressure (Queen, David Bowie)
5. Somebody to Love (Freddie Mercury)
6. Killer Queen (Mercury)
7. Seven Seas of Rhye (Mercury)
8. Keep Yourself Alive (May)
9. Liar (Mercury)
10. Impromptu (Queen)
11. It's a Hard Life (Mercury)
12. Dragon Attack (Mercury)
13. Now I'm Here (May)
14. Is This the World We Created...? (Mercury, May)
15. Love of My Life (Mercury)
16. Another One Bites the Dust (John Deacon)
17. Mustapha (Intro) (Mercury)
18. Hammer to Fall (May)
19. Crazy Little Thing Called Love (Mercury)
20. Bohemian Rhapsody (Mercury)
21. Radio Ga Ga (Roger Taylor)

Encore:

1. I Want to Break Free (Deacon)
2. Jailhouse Rock (Jerry Leiber, Mike Stoller)
3. We Will Rock You (May)
4. We Are the Champions (Mercury)
5. God Save the Queen (arr. May)
