= Jealousy (Queen song) =

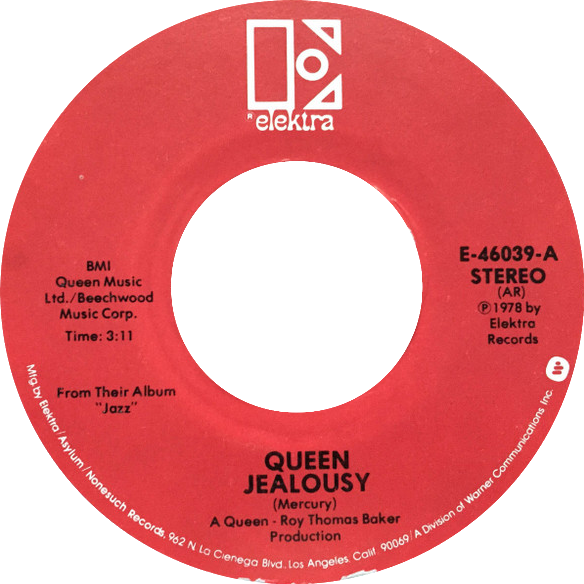
- US single A-side label

Single by Queen

from the album Jazz
- B-side: Fun It; Don't Stop Me Now (USSR)
- Released: 27 April 1979
- Recorded: October 1978
- Studio: Super Bear Studios Berre-les-Alpes, France
- Genre: Glam rock; soft rock
- Length: 3:13
- Label: Elektra
- Songwriter: Freddie Mercury
- Producers: Queen; Roy Thomas Baker

Queen US singles chronology
"Don't Stop Me Now" (1979)	"Jealousy" (1979)	"We Will Rock You (Live at Lyon, 17 Feb '79)" (1979)

"Jealousy" is a song by British Rock band Queen which was originally released on their seventh studio album Jazz in 1978, and one year later was released as the fourth and last single from the album. It was written by Freddie Mercury.

== Background ==
The song has been released as a single only in five countries US, Canada, Brazil, New Zealand, and USSR, but failed to chart anywhere. The single was the only single of the band in the USSR. In the USSR, the B-side of the single was "Don't Stop Me Now", but in other countries the B-side was "Fun It". In 1980, the song had been included in the list of songs for the 1980 Summer Olympics which were celebrated in Moscow.

"Jealousy" was penned by Mercury and features May playing his Hallfredh acoustic guitar. The guitar had been given a replacement hardwood bridge, chiselled flat, with a small piece of fret wire placed between it and the strings, which lay gently above. The strings produce the "buzzing" effect of a sitar. This effect had already been used on "White Queen (As It Began)", from Queen II. Billboard felt that this effect made the song sound Beatlesque. All vocals were recorded by Mercury.

== Reception ==
Cash Box said that the song begins with "an interesting piano and sitar-sounding passage." They further said that the song has "a firm beat, flashy drumming, upfront piano playing and characteristically orchestrated vocals" and that "Freddie Mercury's vocals are evocative" and "Brian May's guitar playing is unusual." Record World said that "Jealousy" is a lighter ballad than typical Queen songs.

== Personnel ==
Queen

- Freddie Mercury – lead and backing vocals, piano
- Brian May – acoustic guitar
- Roger Taylor – drums
- John Deacon – bass guitar
