= It's a Hard Life =

- UK single picture sleeve

Single by Queen

from the album The Works
- B-side: Is This the World We Created...?
- Released: 16 July 1984
- Recorded: August–October 1983
- Studio: Record Plant, Los Angeles
- Genre: Hard rock
- Length: 4:08 (7-inch album version); 5:05 (12-inch extended version)
- Label: EMI (UK); Capitol (US)
- Songwriter: Freddie Mercury
- Producers: Queen; Reinhold Mack

Queen singles chronology
"I Want to Break Free" (1984)	"It's a Hard Life" (1984)	"Hammer to Fall" (1984)

Music video
- "It's a Hard Life" on YouTube

"It's a Hard Life" is a song by the British rock band Queen, written by lead singer Freddie Mercury. It was featured on their 1984 album The Works, and it was the third single from that album. In 1991 it was included in the band’s second compilation album Greatest Hits II.

"It's a Hard Life" reached number six in the UK singles chart and was their third consecutive Top 10 single from the album. It also reached number two in Ireland and number 20 in the Netherlands. It also came 19th in The Nation's Favourite Queen Song, broadcast on ITV on 11 November 2014.

== Composition ==
The opening lyric and melody of "It's a Hard Life" is based on the line "Ridi, Pagliaccio, sul tuo amore infranto!" (Laugh, clown, at your broken love!) from "Vesti la giubba", an aria from Ruggero Leoncavallo's opera Pagliacci. The same melody is also quoted in the soundtrack of the movies The Great Caruso and the Marx Brothers' A Night at the Opera, after which Queen had named their 1975 album.

Musically, the song recreates the feel of "Play the Game" in order to update the story, utilising Mercury's piano playing and the band's characteristic technique of layered harmonies. It is recorded very much with the ethos of earlier Queen albums in that it features 'no synthesizers'. By that time the band had been using synths on record since 1980's The Game and the gesture of returning to the traditional Queen sound was comforting to some fans.

== Critical reception ==
Upon its release as a single, Martin Townsend of Number One picked "It's a Hard Life" as the magazine's single of the week, describing it as a "lush and melodic song". Tom Hibbert of Smash Hits considered it to be a "return to the style of old with a lush ballad featuring a breathy, operatic Freddie Mercury and one of those sumptuous Brian May guitar solos". Howard Johnson, writing for Kerrang!, felt the song was a "revisit" of the band's 1980 hit "Play the Game". He continued that "isn't necessarily a bad thing considering some of the guff that Queen have been releasing recently, but it ain't no 'Seven Seas of Rhye'". Eleanor Levy of Record Mirror was critical, calling it a "cynical repetition of past glories with a beginning that could be 'Bohemian Rhapsody' and an overall feeling of lethargy". In the US, Billboard wrote, "Always a new trick up the sleeve of those rhapsodic bohemians; first a 'Pagliacci' quote, then an acoustic interlude, and on into all the deadpan high drama that can fit into four minutes."

== Music video ==
The accompanying music video, directed by Tim Pope and produced by Gordon Lewis, has been created in an operatic "style," with the band and extras appearing in period "operatic-style" costume. The video also featured an unusual "skull and bones"-themed guitar that cost more than £1,000, played by May, which can also be seen on the single's cover, and also relied heavily on the use of alchemist and pagan symbols and symbolism.

The band found the costumes hot and uncomfortable, and the "eyes" on Mercury's outfit were ridiculed by the others, saying he looked "like a giant prawn". Both Brian May and Roger Taylor groaned out loud when shown this video during their commentary for the Greatest Video Hits 2 collection. Taylor, who openly admits to "loving the record, but really hating the video", said in the commentary: “I think we look more stupid in this video than any other artists has looked in a video." May pointed out more positively that the video was an ironic take, as it portrayed Mercury as a wealthy man singing about how hard life and love are, and at that point Mercury in real life possessed great wealth but was still searching for love.

The video was filmed at the Arnold & Richter studio in Munich. Actors Kurt Raab and Barbara Valentin, friends of Mercury, can be seen as extras. Ingrid Mack, who is married to record producer Reinhold Mack and a friend of the band, is also featured.

== Track listings ==
7" single

1. "It's a Hard Life" (Album Version) – 4:08
2. "Is This the World We Created...?" – 2:12

12" single

1. "It's a Hard Life" (Extended Version) – 5:05
2. "Is This the World We Created...?" – 2:12

== Personnel ==
- Freddie Mercury – lead and backing vocals, piano
- Brian May – guitars, backing vocals
- Roger Taylor – drums, backing vocals
- John Deacon – bass guitar

== Live recordings ==
- Live in Rio (VHS)
- We Are the Champions: Final Live in Japan (DVD)

The song was only played on The Works Tour.

On 17 Nov 2010, Tom Chaplin of Keane performed "It's a Hard Life" live with Brian May and Roger Taylor at The Prince's Trust Gala.

== Chart positions ==
Chart (1984)	Peak position
UK Singles (Official Charts)	6
Australia (Kent Music Report)	65
Netherlands (Single Top 100)	20
Netherlands (Dutch Top 40 Tipparade)	4
Belgium (Ultratop 50 Flanders)	31
Germany (GfK)	26
New Zealand (Recorded Music NZ)	30
Ireland (IRMA)	2
US Billboard Hot 100	72
