= Jazz (Queen album) =

Studio album by Queen
- Released: 10 November 1978
- Recorded: Early July – 14 October 1978
- Studios: Mountain (Montreux); Studio Miraval (Correns); Super Bear (Berre-les-Alpes)
- Genres: Hard rock; heavy metal; pop; arena rock
- Length: 44:39
- Labels: EMI; Elektra; Ariola (France)
- Producers: Queen; Roy Thomas Baker

Queen chronology
News of the World (1977)	Jazz (1978)	Live Killers (1979)

Queen studio album chronology
News of the World (1977)	Jazz (1978)	The Game (1980)

Singles from Jazz
- 1. "Bicycle Race" / "Fat Bottomed Girls" Released: 13 October 1978; 2. "Don't Stop Me Now" Released: 26 January 1979; 3. "Mustapha" Released: April 1979 (Germany); 4. "Jealousy" Released: 27 April 1979 (US)

Jazz is the seventh studio album by the British rock band Queen. It was co-produced by Roy Thomas Baker, and was released on 10 November 1978 by EMI Records in the United Kingdom and by Elektra Records in the United States. The album artwork was suggested by Roger Taylor, who had seen a similar design painted on the Berlin Wall. The album's varying musical styles were alternately praised and criticised. It reached number two in the UK Albums Chart and number six on the US Billboard Top LPs & Tape chart.

== Recording ==
Rehearsals for Jazz began during the first week of July 1978. In the previous month the band had received a hefty tax bill; they consequently decided to record outside the United Kingdom. They had to make a swift decision, as Brian May would be forced out of the UK on 2 July due to these tax-related issues. This was shortly after the birth of his first child, Jimmy. As May relocated to Canada, the rest of the band flew to Nice, France, to begin rehearsing for the album. May soon joined the rehearsals.

The band attended the nearby Montreux Jazz Festival, which likely inspired the title of the album. There, they ran into David Bowie, who was working on his album Lodger (which would be released the following year) between tour dates. Bowie convinced them to record at Mountain Studios in Montreux.

Before the band shifted to Montreux, they finished preliminary recordings of "Don't Stop Me Now", "Fat Bottomed Girls", "In Only Seven Days", and "More of That Jazz". Production on the album was moved to Montreux the day after the jazz festival. On 19 July, May's 31st birthday, the band attended the 18th stage of the 1978 Tour de France, which inspired Freddie Mercury to write the lead single, "Bicycle Race".

During the next three weeks the band were in Mountain Studios, primarily working on "Fun It", "Jealousy", "Leaving Home Ain't Easy", and "Let Me Entertain You". They took a few days off, most notably on 26 July when they trashed a Montreux hotel whilst celebrating Taylor's 29th birthday. Mercury was reportedly seen swinging on a cut-glass chandelier in the hotel during the party.

After a brief holiday in the middle of August, the band moved production back to France, where they worked at Super Bear Studios. They would spend the rest of the month recording "Mustapha", "Bicycle Race", "If You Can't Beat Them", "Dead On Time", and "Dreamer's Ball" (based on the previous lists of completed songs).

The band completed overdubbing the songs in September, and mixed the lead single early before sending it to New York City for mastering, which was completed on 14 September. They mixed the rest of the album beginning in the middle of the month. Jazz was officially completed on 14 October, during a mastering session at Super Bear Studios.

== Songs ==
=== Side one ===
==== "Mustapha" ====
"Mustapha" is a song written by Freddie Mercury. It was released as a single in 1979.

The lyrics consist of English, Arabic, Persian and possibly a number of invented words. Some understandable words are "Mustapha", "Ibrahim" and the phrases "Allah, Allah, Allah we'll pray for you", "salaam alaykum" and "alaykum salaam".

In live performances, such as the performance on Live Killers, Mercury would often sing the opening vocals of "Mustapha" in place of the complex introduction to "Bohemian Rhapsody", going from "Allah, will pray for you" to "Mama, just killed a man...". He also sang the intro before launching the band into "Hammer to Fall", as seen on We Are the Champions: Final Live in Japan. However, from the 1979 Saarbrücken Festival to the South American Game Tour, the band performed an almost full version of the song, with Mercury at the piano.

==== "Fat Bottomed Girls" ====
"Fat Bottomed Girls" was written by Brian May with lead vocals shared by Mercury and May, who sings lead on the chorus. On stage Mercury sang the entire song, with Roger Taylor and May doing harmonies. Both guitar and bass are played in drop-D tuning for this song, a rarity for Queen.

==== "Jealousy" ====
"Jealousy" was penned by Mercury, and features May playing his Hallfredh acoustic guitar. The guitar had been given a replacement hardwood bridge, chiselled flat, with a small piece of fret wire placed between it and the strings, which lay gently above. The strings produce the "buzzing" effect of a sitar. This effect had previously been used on "White Queen (As It Began)", from Queen II. All vocals were recorded by Mercury.

==== "Bicycle Race" ====
"Bicycle Race" is a complex composition by Mercury. It features several modulations, unusual chord functions, a meter change (4/4 to 6/8 and back), and a programmatic section (a race of guitars emulating the bicycle race).

==== "If You Can't Beat Them" ====
"If You Can't Beat Them" is another hard rock composition by John Deacon and a live favourite for the band in the late 1970s. It is one of the few songs by Deacon where May plays all the guitars.

==== "Let Me Entertain You" ====
"Let Me Entertain You" was written by Mercury, directed towards the audience. The line "we'll sing to you in Japanese" is a reference to May's "Teo Torriatte (Let Us Cling Together)", from A Day at the Races (1976). The song also contains a reference to their tour manager Gerry Stickells, in the line "Hey! If you need a fix, if you want a high, Stickells will see to that." In the very next line, Mercury mentions Queen's record labels at the time (Elektra, and EMI): "With Elektra and EMI; we'll show you where it's at!". The idea of a guitar riff in parallel sixths was re-used later in "The Hitman", a track on the Innuendo album.

=== Side two ===
==== "Dead on Time" ====
"Dead on Time", written by May, contains two high belts by Mercury that top at C♯5. It was never played in concert; May would only incorporate snippets of it in his guitar solos during the Jazz Tour and the Works Tour.

The song ends with the sound of a thunderbolt, followed by Mercury screaming "You're dead!" The thunderbolt was actually recorded by May on a portable recorder during a thunderstorm. The album's liner notes credit the thunderbolt to God.

==== "In Only Seven Days" ====
"In Only Seven Days" is Deacon's other songwriting contribution on the album. He also plays acoustic and electric guitar on this song. It was the B-side of "Don't Stop Me Now".

==== "Dreamer's Ball" ====
"Dreamer's Ball" is Brian May's tribute to Elvis Presley, who died one year before the album was released. The arrangement for the concert version was completely different, with May and Taylor doing vocal brasses.

==== "Fun It" ====
"Fun It" is a funk track with a disco vibe by Taylor, where both he and Mercury shared the vocals. Taylor did the lead vocals, while Mercury was backup. Taylor used Syndrum pads and played most of the instruments.

==== "Leaving Home Ain't Easy" ====
"Leaving Home Ain't Easy" is a ballad by May, who also sings all the vocals (lead and harmony). His voice was speeded up for the bridge in order to create a feminine voice.

==== "Don't Stop Me Now" ====
"Don't Stop Me Now" was written by Mercury. It was a top ten hit single in the UK. May's only input is a short guitar solo and backing vocals. The song is used in the bar scene of the motion picture Shaun of the Dead, and in a fight scene in the 2015 motion picture Hardcore Henry. The BBC TV show Top Gear named it the top song in a viewer poll of Top Ten driving songs. Google also used the song for their Google Doodle to commemorate Mercury's 65th birthday on 5 September 2011.

==== "More of That Jazz" ====
"More of That Jazz", written by Taylor, is loop-based. Taylor plays most instruments and sings all vocals, reaching some very high notes (peaking on an E5). The coda also contains short clips from many songs on the album, including "Dead on Time", "Bicycle Race", "Mustapha", "If You Can't Beat Them", "Fun It", and "Fat Bottomed Girls".

== Release ==
=== Alternative artwork ===
A bicycle race with nude women was held to promote the album and the "Fat Bottomed Girls"/"Bicycle Race" single. A poster of the start of the race was included with copies of the LP. A smaller portion of the poster image also used as an alternative single cover for "Bicycle Race".

A small version of the poster was included with the Crown Jewels box set.

=== Singles ===
Four singles were released from the album:

- "Bicycle Race"/"Fat Bottomed Girls (edit)" – Elektra E45541; released October 1978.

"Bicycle Race" and "Fat Bottomed Girls" were released in 1978 as a double A-side; the band staged a famous nude, all-female bicycle race to promote the single. The bicycle race took place on 17 September 1978 at Wimbledon Stadium in London. The picture sleeve showed a rear view of one of the ladies on her bicycle, but a pair of red panties were painted on to avoid public outcry. Legend has it that the band borrowed the bicycles from a store ("Halfords", according to the liner notes), but upon returning them were informed that they would have to purchase all the seats, as they had been used in an improper manner (i.e. without clothing).

- "Mustapha" was released in 1979 only in Bolivia, Spain, Yugoslavia and Germany. Its B-side was "Dead on Time" ("In Only Seven Days" in Yugoslavia).
- "Don't Stop Me Now"/"More of That Jazz" – Elektra E46008; released February 1979.

"Don't Stop Me Now" was released in 1979; its B-side was "In Only Seven Days" ("More of That Jazz" in the US and Canada).

- "Jealousy"/"Fun It" – Elektra E46039; released April 1979.

"Jealousy" was released in 1979 in the US, New Zealand, Brazil, USSR, and Canada; its B-side was "Fun It" ("Don't Stop Me Now" in USSR, on a blue flexi disc).

== Reception ==
Retrospective professional reviews
Review scores
Source	Rating
AllMusic	4/5 stars
Chicago Tribune	1.5/4 stars
Christgau's Record Guide	C+
The Encyclopedia of Popular Music	2/5 stars
The Guardian	5/5 stars
MusicHound Rock: The Essential Album Guide	3/5 stars
The Rolling Stone Album Guide	2/5 stars
Uncut	4/5 stars

Reviewing for Rolling Stone in 1979, Dave Marsh panned Jazz as "more of the same dull pastiche" from Queen, who he said displayed "elitist notions" with some of their musical choices and lyrics. Marsh said "Fat Bottomed Girls" treated women "not as sex objects but as objects, period (the way the band regards people in general)", and finished by famously tagging Queen "the first truly fascist rock band". Mitchell Cohen of Creem gave another negative review, calling Jazz "absurdly dull" and filled with "dumb ideas and imitative posturing". Village Voice critic Robert Christgau said the album was not wholly bad, even finding "Bicycle Race" humorous, although he said Queen sounded like the band 10cc "with a spoke, or a pump, up their ass". The Los Angeles Times concluded that, "while the surfaces remain as mainstream and as accessible as ever, there's a maturity to Queen that suggests even more advances are possible."

In a retrospective assessment, Stephen Thomas Erlewine of AllMusic described it as "one of their sleekest albums". He cited that the album's diversity and exaggeration made it "more fun than any of their other albums." Alexis Petridis wrote in The Guardian, "Jazz was hysterical in every sense of the word, but the music press comprehensively failed to get the joke, particularly in the US". In 2006, Jim DeRogatis of the Chicago Sun-Times included it in his list of "The Great Albums," describing it as "a genre-hopping tour of diverse musical styles" and concluded that "What ultimately keeps me coming back to the album, however, is that ambiguous sexual energy running through all 13 tracks; the fact that each of them boasts more hooks than some bands have on an entire album, and the inviting sonic density of it all." The Chicago Tribune was less favorable, awarding the album one-and-a-half stars.

When Louder ranked every Queen album from best to worst, Jazz came fourth, as they felt it presented "some of the most satisfying moments in Queen's career." In a similar list of the band's greatest albums, Ultimate Classic Rock placed Jazz in third position. "Whenever discussions take place about Queen's incredible string of classic albums throughout the late '70s," they wrote, "1978's 'Jazz' is the one that often seems to get the shortest shrift, but tucked away behind its unusually nondescript cover art lies one of the band's finest albums. Never mind the reliable hit single double-whammy provided by 'Fat Bottomed Girls' and 'Bicycle Race,' Jazz is astonishingly deep with underrated Queen gems, ranging from Mercury's Eastern-spiced wig-out 'Mustapha,' to Deacon's head-banging beast 'If You Can't Beat Them, Join Them,' to Taylor's infectious disco tune 'Fun It'."

Rolling Stone subsequently featured it on their list of 10 Classic Albums Rolling Stone Initially Panned, indicating they now regarded the album as a "classic". They poked fun at Marsh's original negative review of the album, quipping: "Sometimes a reviewer just seems to have a really, really low opinion of a band, which seems to be the case with Dave Marsh and Queen."

== 2011 re-issue ==
In March 2011, a remastered and expanded reissue of the album was released. This was part of a new record deal between Queen and Universal Music, which meant Queen's association with EMI Records would come to an end after almost 40 years. All Queen albums were remastered and reissued in 2011. The deluxe edition contains five additional tracks on a separate EP. The second batch of albums (the band's middle five albums) were released in June 2011. The extra tracks included the single version of "Fat Bottomed Girls", an instrumental version of "Bicycle Race", a version of "Don't Stop Me Now" with "long lost guitars", a live version of "Let Me Entertain You", and an early acoustic take of "Dreamer's Ball".

The 2011 reissue corrected the tape glitch at the beginning of "Fat Bottomed Girls" which had been present on all previous compact disc editions of the album (as well as 1997 compilation album Queen Rocks); however, it also added a previously unused kick-drum part to the track "Jealousy", making the track sound drastically different from all previous releases.

== Track listing ==
All lead vocals by Freddie Mercury unless noted.

Side one
No.	Title	Writer(s)	Lead vocals	Length
1.	"Mustapha"	Mercury		3:03
2.	"Fat Bottomed Girls"	Brian May	Mercury with May	4:14
3.	"Jealousy"	Mercury		3:14
4.	"Bicycle Race"	Mercury		3:04
5.	"If You Can't Beat Them"	John Deacon		4:15
6.	"Let Me Entertain You"	Mercury		3:01

Side two
No.	Title	Writer(s)	Lead vocals	Length
7.	"Dead on Time"	May		3:23
8.	"In Only Seven Days"	Deacon		2:30
9.	"Dreamer's Ball"	May		3:30
10.	"Fun It"	Roger Taylor	Taylor with Mercury	3:29
11.	"Leaving Home Ain't Easy"	May	May	3:15
12.	"Don't Stop Me Now"	Mercury		3:29
13.	"More of That Jazz"	Taylor	Taylor	4:12
Total length:				44:39

Bonus tracks (1991 Hollywood Records CD reissue)
No.	Title	Length
14.	"Fat Bottomed Girls" (1991 bonus remix by Brian Malouf)	4:22
15.	"Bicycle Race" (1991 bonus remix by Junior Vasquez)	4:59
Total length:		53:20

Disc 2: Bonus EP (2011 Universal Music CD reissue)
No.	Title	Length
1.	"Fat Bottomed Girls" (Single Version)	3:23
2.	"Bicycle Race" (Instrumental)	3:09
3.	"Don't Stop Me Now" (With long-lost guitars)	3:34
4.	"Let Me Entertain You" (live at the Montreal Forum, November 1981)	2:48
5.	"Dreamer's Ball" (Early acoustic take, August 1978)	3:40
Total length:		16:34

Bonus videos (2011 iTunes deluxe edition)
No.	Title	Length
6.	"Bicycle Race" (Promo Video)	3:02
7.	"Fat Bottomed Girls" (Live at the Milton Keynes Bowl, June 5th 1982)	4:26
8.	"Let Me Entertain You" (Live at the Budokan, Tokyo, April 1979)	2:47
Total length:		26:09

== Personnel ==
Personnel taken from Jazz liner notes.

Queen

- Freddie Mercury – vocals, piano
- Brian May – guitars, vocals
- Roger Taylor – drums, percussion, vocals
- John Deacon – bass guitar

Production

- Queen, Roy Thomas Baker – producers
- Geoffrey Workman – engineer
- John Etchells – assistant engineer

== Charts ==
Chart (1978–1979)	Peak position
Argentina (CAPIF)	3
Australian Albums (Kent Music Report)	15
Austrian Albums (Ö3 Austria)	8
Canada Top Albums/CDs (RPM)	13
Dutch Albums (Album Top 100)	3
Finnish Albums (The Official Finnish Charts)	15
French Albums (SNEP)	7
German Albums (Offizielle Top 100)	5
Japanese Albums (Oricon)	5
New Zealand Albums (RMNZ)	20
Norwegian Albums (VG-lista)	6
Portuguese Albums (Musica & Som)	6
Swedish Albums (Sverigetopplistan)	6
UK Albums (Official Charts)	2
US Billboard 200	6

Chart (2019)	Peak position
Belgian Albums (Ultratop Wallonia)	167

== Certifications and sales ==
Region	Certification	Certified units/sales
Austria (IFPI Austria)	Gold	25,000^{*}
Belgium	—	55,000
Canada (Music Canada)	Platinum	100,000^{^}
France (SNEP)	Gold	100,000^{*}
Germany (BVMI)	Gold	330,000
Italy (FIMI)	Gold	25,000^{‡}
Japan (RIAJ)	Gold	100,000^{^}
Netherlands (NVPI)	Platinum	100,000^{^}
New Zealand (RMNZ)	2× Platinum	30,000^{‡}
Poland (ZPAV)	Platinum	20,000^{*}
Switzerland (IFPI Switzerland)	Platinum	50,000^{^}
United Kingdom (BPI)	Gold	100,000^{^}
United States (RIAA)	Platinum	1,000,000^{^}
^{*} Sales figures based on certification alone.^{^} Shipments figures based on certification alone.^{‡} Sales+streaming figures based on certification alone.
