= Don't Stop Me Now =

1979 single by Queen

- UK single picture sleeve

Single by Queen

from the album Jazz
- B-side: "In Only Seven Days" (UK); "More of That Jazz" (US)
- Released: 26 January 1979
- Recorded: August 1978
- Studio: Super Bear Studios (Berre-les-Alpes, France)
- Genre: Pop rock; power pop
- Length: 3:29 (album version); 3:34 (with long-lost guitars version); 3:38 (...revisited version)
- Label: EMI (UK); Elektra (US)
- Songwriter: Freddie Mercury
- Producers: Roy Thomas Baker; Queen

Queen singles chronology
"Bicycle Race" / "Fat Bottomed Girls" (1978)	"Don't Stop Me Now" (1979)	"Mustapha" (1979)

Queen US singles chronology
"Bicycle Race" / "Fat Bottomed Girls" (1978)	"Don't Stop Me Now" (1979)	"Jealousy" (1979)

Music video
- "Don't Stop Me Now" on YouTube

"Don't Stop Me Now" is a song by the British rock band Queen, featured on their 1978 album Jazz and released as a single on 26 January 1979. Written by lead singer Freddie Mercury, it was recorded in August 1978 at Super Bear Studios in Berre-les-Alpes (Alpes-Maritimes), France, and is the twelfth track on the album.

The song also appeared on the band's 1981 compilation album Greatest Hits. In June 2011, as part of Queen's 40th anniversary celebrations, an old take of the song containing more guitar parts was included on the bonus EP of the re-released and remastered Jazz album. Featuring in films, commercials, and television shows, the song has grown in popularity in the decades since its release. Bobby Olivier of Billboard attributes its initial rebirth to its appearance in the 2004 cult classic zombie apocalypse film Shaun of the Dead. In 2014, Rolling Stone readers voted it their third-favourite song by Queen.

== Background ==
The song was written by Freddie Mercury during the sessions for Jazz. The band felt they were "getting better at having a good time" and the lyrics reflect this. Musically, the song builds on Mercury's piano playing, with John Deacon and Roger Taylor providing a bass guitar and drums backing track. The song also provides an example of Queen's trademark style of multitrack harmony vocals for the chorus lines.

An alternative version of the song, with a harder, guitar-driven arrangement, appeared on Bohemian Rhapsody: The Original Soundtrack issued in 2018, billed as "Don't Stop Me Now... Revisited".

== Reception ==
The single reached number 9 in the UK charts but only number 86 in the US; as the album was a top-10 hit, the song got some airplay on U.S. album-oriented rock stations despite its low chart ranking as a single. Despite this, the song has grown in stature with time and has been popularised not only by consistent airplay, but by its use in advertisements, television programmes and films, and through cover versions. It has subsequently become one of Queen's most popular songs. The song was voted as the third-best Queen song by readers of Rolling Stone, who noted that "time has also been very kind to it and it's widely seen now as one of the group's best works." The single also has reached platinum status in the United Kingdom. In a March 2019 Billboard article titled, "The Evolution of Queen's 'Don't Stop Me Now': How a Minor Hit Became One of the Band's Most Beloved (And Inescapable) Songs", Bobby Olivier wrote,

"You might have noticed a new commercial promoting the new season of American Idol. It was a 90-second music video featuring a dozen or so bright-eyed contestants, all of whom gleefully belted lines from a beloved song that has felt particularly ubiquitous as of late. No, it wasn't "Shallow," or "Thank U, Next"—it was Queen's "Don't Stop Me Now," a classic-rock energizer that has, in the last six months alone, also been featured in commercials for Toyota, Silk almond milk, Amazon and L'Oreal. In the latter spot, Camila Cabello lip-syncs to the 41-year-old song as she dances and applies her lipstick. "Don't Stop Me Now" is not only one of the band's most treasured cuts, but one of the most popular songs of its entire era. On Sunday, March 3 [2019], it eclipsed 500 million plays on Spotify—nearly double that of any Rolling Stones, U2 or Led Zeppelin song on the service."

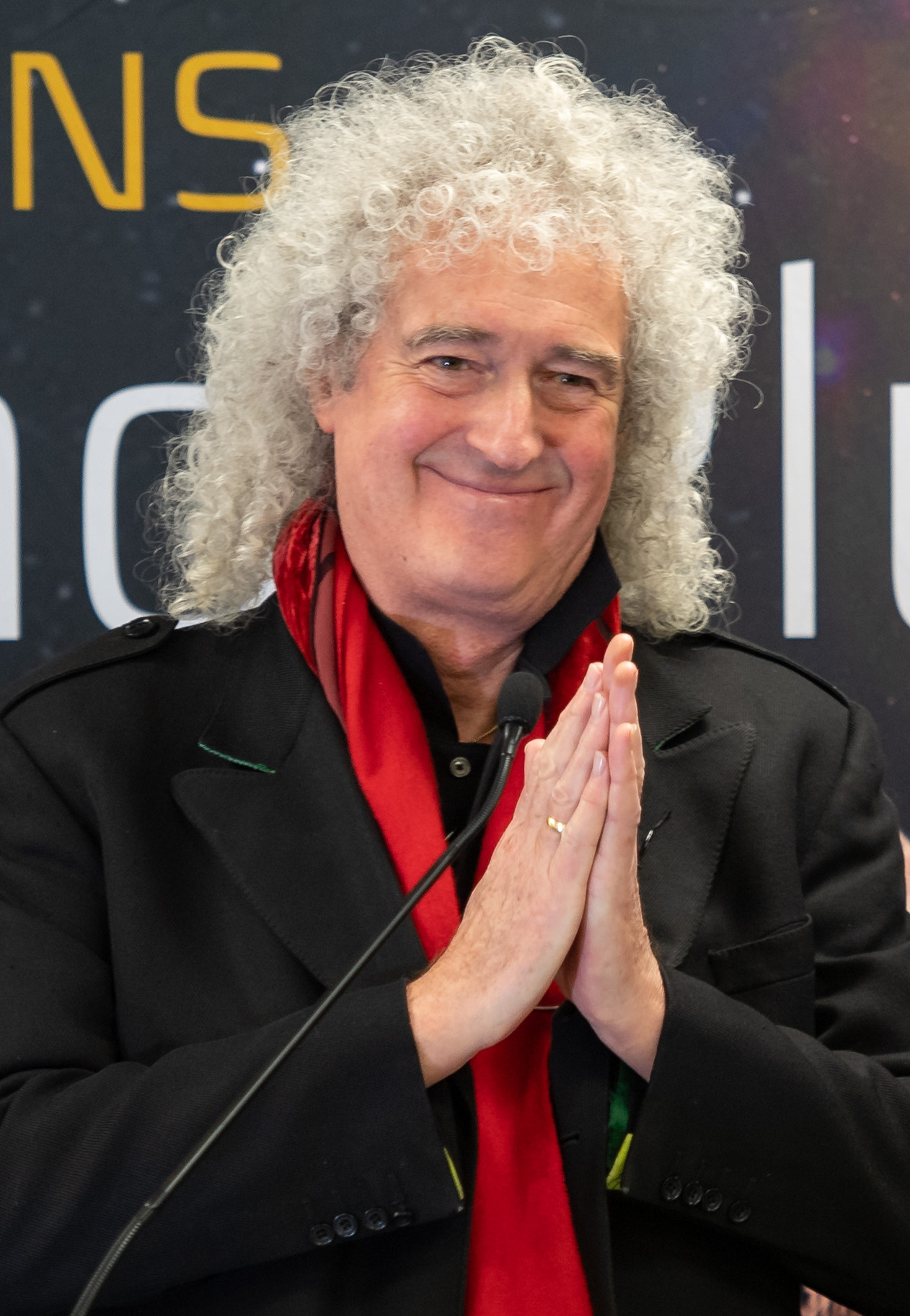
Brian May, 2018

Alexis Petridis of The Guardian wrote that the "astonishing" song "may be Queen's greatest song of all". He felt it was "a direct product of [Mercury's] hedonism and promiscuity: an unrepentant, joyous, utterly irresistible paean to gay pleasure-seeking. You find yourself wondering if its title might not have been aimed at his censorious bandmates." Mike Orme of Stylus Magazine ranked it the 7th-greatest penultimate track on an album, calling it Queen's "most flamboyant and energetic single" and commenting: "Essentially three and a half minutes of Freddie Mercury jacking the mike from the rest of the world, the song offers him a chance to let us know just how much fun he's having in the spotlight." Billboard praised Brian May's guitar solo and also stated that the song was "less gimmick laden" than Queen's previous single from Jazz, "Bicycle Race"/"Fat Bottomed Girls", "while still retaining the brazen braggadocio of Freddie Mercury's lead vocals." Cash Box said it has "vocal dramatics and varied arrangements by Mercury" and "beautifully layered vocals and regal guitar work from May". Record World called it a "fast paced tune with that easily identifiable Freddie Mercury lead vocal and Brian May guitar." The television show Top Gear voted it the Greatest Driving Song Ever.

== Criticism ==
Despite its popularity, Brian May was not originally a fan of the song as he felt it was celebrating the hedonistic and risky lifestyle of Mercury, which he considered threatening. He added that he struggled with the lyrics at the time, because it was about a difficult period in Freddie's life when the singer was "taking lots of drugs and having sex with lots of men". However, after hearing the song being played at weddings, parties and funerals, he has come to appreciate it as representing "great joy".

== Music video ==
The video for the song was directed by J. Kliebenstein and filmed at the Forest National, Brussels, Belgium on 26 January 1979. The video was uploaded to Queen's official YouTube channel on 1 August 2008.

== Live performances ==
Viewed at the time of release as one of the lesser songs in the Queen canon, it was only performed live during 1979, with the last performance in the Crazy Tour. On the studio version, Brian May's only guitar playing is in his guitar solo, but on live versions performed on the band's 1979 Jazz and Crazy tours, May would also play rhythm guitar throughout the rest of the song to give more of a rock feel. A live version of the song features in the band's 1979 album Live Killers.

Queen reintroduced the track to their set in the 2010s with Adam Lambert and it is now a popular live favourite.

== Personnel ==
Queen:

- Freddie Mercury – lead and backing vocals, piano
- Brian May – guitars, backing vocals
- Roger Taylor – drums, percussion, tambourine, triangle, backing vocals
- John Deacon – bass guitar

== Charts ==
Chart (1979–2022)	Peak position	Peak year
Belgium (Ultratop 50 Flanders)	23	1979
Germany (GfK)	35	1979
Ireland (IRMA)	10	1979
Netherlands (Dutch Top 40)	14	1979
Netherlands (Single Top 100)	16	1979
UK Singles (Official Charts)	9	1979
US Billboard Hot 100	86	1979
Sweden (Sverigetopplistan)	37	2009
Portugal Digital Songs (Billboard)	7	2014
France (SNEP)	68	2015
Australia (ARIA)	53	2018
Austria (Ö3 Austria Top 40)	38	2018
Czech Republic Singles Digital (ČNS IFPI)	13	2018
Hungary (Single Top 40)	15	2018
Italy (FIMI)	54	2018
Japan Hot 100 (Billboard)	37	2018
Netherlands (Single Top 100)	97	2018
Portugal (AFP)	65	2018
Slovakia Singles Digital (ČNS IFPI)	27	2018
Spain (Promusicae)	77	2018
Switzerland (Schweizer Hitparade)	52	2018
UK Rock & Metal (Official Charts)	1	2018
US Hot Rock & Alternative Songs (Billboard)	7	2018
Japan Hot 100 (Billboard)	32	2019

=== Year-end charts ===
2019 year-end chart performance for "Don't Stop Me Now"
Chart (2019)	Position
France (SNEP)	134
Hungary (Single Top 40)	81
Portugal (AFP)	166
UK Singles (Official Charts Company)	99
US Hot Rock Songs (Billboard)	25

2022 year-end chart performance for "Don't Stop Me Now"
Chart (2022)	Position
UK Singles (OCC)	99

=== Revisited version ===
Chart (2019)	Peak position
US Hot Rock & Alternative Songs (Billboard)	30

== Certifications ==
Region	Certification	Certified units/sales
Australia (ARIA)	5× Platinum	350,000^{‡}
Brazil (Pro-Música Brasil)	Gold	30,000^{‡}
Denmark (IFPI Danmark)	3× Platinum	270,000^{‡}
Germany (BVMI)	3× Gold	900,000^{‡}
Italy (FIMI) Sales since 2009	4× Platinum	400,000^{‡}
Japan (RIAJ) 2011 release	Gold	100,000^{*}
New Zealand (RMNZ)	7× Platinum	210,000^{‡}
Portugal (AFP)	3× Platinum	120,000^{‡}
Spain (Promusicae)	4× Platinum	240,000^{‡}
United Kingdom (BPI)	5× Platinum	3,000,000^{‡}
United States (RIAA)	4× Platinum	4,000,000^{‡}
^{*} Sales figures based on certification alone.^{‡} Sales+streaming figures based on certification alone.

== McFly version ==
"Don't Stop Me Now" / "Please, Please"

Single by McFly

from the album Motion in the Ocean
- Released: 17 July 2006
- Length: 3:20 ("Don't Stop Me Now"); 3:09 ("Please, Please")
- Label: Island; Universal
- Songwriters: Freddie Mercury ("Don't Stop Me Now"); Danny Jones, Dougie Poynter, Harry Judd, Jason Perry, Tom Fletcher ("Please, Please")
- Producers: Jason Perry; Julian Emery

McFly singles chronology
"Ultraviolet" / "The Ballad of Paul K" (2005)	"Don't Stop Me Now" / "Please, Please" (2006)	"Star Girl" (2006)

In 2006, English band McFly covered "Don't Stop Me Now" and released it as a double A-side single with original track "Please, Please". The release, titled "Don't Stop Me Now" / "Please, Please", was the first single from their third album, Motion in the Ocean. It premiered on BBC Radio 1 on 7 June 2006. The double A-side entered the UK Singles Chart at number one on 23 July 2006, knocking "Smile" by Lily Allen off the top spot. It also reached number 15 in Ireland.

=== Charity ===
Some of the money from any version of the single went to Sport Relief and as a result their version of "Don't Stop Me Now" was played across the BBC's sport programmes, including highlights from the 2006 FIFA World Cup. It also was the theme for the "Sport Relief Mile", which McFly also took part in. Judd also travelled to India for Sport Relief with a collection of other British celebrities including presenter and comedian Nick Hancock and radio DJ and presenter Chris Evans. Whilst out in India, Harry took part in a cricket tournament, travelling across India's poorest areas and playing with everyone from the kids to the professionals, all in aid of Sport Relief.

=== Track listings ===
UK CD1

1. "Don't Stop Me Now"
2. "Please, Please" (radio version)

UK CD2

1. "Please, Please" (single version)
2. "Don't Stop Me Now"
3. "5 Colours in Her Hair" (US version)
4. "5 Colours in Her Hair" (live from Arena Tour)
5. "5 Colours in Her Hair" (live video)
6. "Harry in India for Sport Relief"

UK DVD single

1. "Please, Please" (audio)
2. "Don't Stop Me Now" (audio)
3. "I've Got You" (US version)
4. "I've Got You" (US movie video)
5. "Please, Please" (video)
6. Behind the scenes at the "Please, Please" video shoot

=== Charts ===
==== Weekly charts ====
Chart (2006)	Peak position
Europe (Eurochart Hot 100)	4
Ireland (IRMA)	15
Scottish Singles Sales (Official Charts)	1
UK Singles (Official Charts)	1
UK Airplay (Music Week)	46

==== Year-end charts ====
Chart (2006)	Position
UK Singles (OCC)	89

== Other versions ==
Cover versions include:

- Foxes covered the song on the 11 October 2014 episode of Doctor Who, "Mummy on the Orient Express". A music video was subsequently released by the BBC to publicise series 8 of the rebooted show.
- The Vandals, on their 2004 album Hollywood Potato Chip.
- The song was covered by The Muppets as the closing number of the 2026 revival special of The Muppet Show.
- Darren Criss covers this song in Glee's episode Diva in Season 4.

== In popular culture ==
- The song was used in a scene in the 2004 film Shaun of the Dead
- The song was used in the final fight scene in the 2015 film Hardcore Henry
- The song and its associated Wikipedia page feature in Hank Green's 2018 novel An Absolutely Remarkable Thing
- The song was used in the 2019 film Shazam!
- The song was used in the Sonic the Hedgehog franchise: the 2020 film of the same name, and a launch trailer for the 2022 game Sonic Frontiers, as well as other promotional material
- The song was used in the 2024 film Venom: The Last Dance
- The song is featured in the official trailer for the 2025 film Elio

== See also ==
- List of best-selling singles

== Bibliography ==
- Blake, Mark (2010). Is This The Real Life? The Untold Story of Queen. Arum Press. ISBN 978-1-84513-713-7.
