= Bicycle Race =

- UK single picture sleeve

Single by Queen

from the album Jazz
- A-side: “Fat Bottomed Girls" (double A-side)
- Released: 13 October 1978
- Recorded: July 1978
- Genre: Rock
- Length: 3:01
- Label: EMI (UK); Elektra (US)
- Songwriter: Freddie Mercury
- Producers: Queen and Roy Thomas Baker

Queen singles chronology
"It's Late" (1978)	"Bicycle Race" / "Fat Bottomed Girls" (1978)	"Don't Stop Me Now" (1979)

Music video
- "Bicycle Race" on YouTube

"Bicycle Race" is a song by the British rock band Queen. It was released on their 1978 album Jazz and written by Queen's lead singer Freddie Mercury. It was released as a double A-side single together with the song "Fat Bottomed Girls", reaching number 11 in the UK Singles Chart and number 24 in the Billboard Hot 100 in the US. The song is included in their 1981 Greatest Hits compilation.

The song is notable for its video featuring a bicycle race with nude women at Wimbledon Stadium. The controversial video was edited or even banned in several countries. The song itself has appeared in various media with a bicycle theme.

== Composition ==
The song was written by Freddie Mercury and was inspired by watching the 18th stage of the 1978 Tour de France passing Montreux, where the band were recording Jazz in Mountain Studios. It starts with a chorus unaccompanied by instruments. The chorus is followed by two verses connected with a bridge, both followed by a chorus. Around the middle of the song is a solo played with numerous bicycle bells. The song has an unusual chord progression with numerous modulations, a change of metre (from 4/4 to 3/4) in the bridge, and multitracked vocal and guitar harmonies, all in keeping with the band's progressive rock roots.

== Reception ==
Cash Box called it "a jaunty theatrical tribute to bike riding." Record World said that it combines "inventive lyrics and harmonies" with class.

== Lyrics ==
The lyrics are topical for the time and contain social, political, and pop culture references, such as religion, the Vietnam War, Watergate, cocaine, fictional characters (Peter Pan, Frankenstein and Superman), and the films Jaws and Star Wars.

Brian May has said that the song was not an autobiographical portrait of Mercury and that Mercury did not particularly enjoy bicycling, also noting that despite the lyric "I don't like Star Wars", Mercury was a Star Wars fan.

The song references the band's song "Fat Bottomed Girls" with the line "fat bottomed girls, they'll be riding today". "Fat Bottomed Girls" reciprocates with "Get on your bikes and ride!" The two songs were released together as a double A-sided single.

== Music video ==
Filmed by Denis de Vallance, the promotional video featured 65 nude women, all professional models, bicycle racing at Wimbledon Greyhound Stadium, southwest London. The group rented the stadium and several dozen bicycles for one day for filming the scene; however, when the renting company became aware of the way their bikes were used, they requested that the group purchase all the bicycle seats. The released video used special effects to hide the nudity, but the uncensored video exists on YouTube and is age-restricted.

== Distribution ==
The song was released as a single and is also included in the following albums and box sets: Queen, Bohemian Rhapsody, 15 Of The Best, Queen Live In Concert, Greatest Hits and The Singles Collection Volume 1.

The single was mostly distributed in 1978, on 7-inch vinyl records, with "Fat Bottomed Girls" on the B-side and EMI record label. In Argentina, the titles were translated as "Carrera de Bicicletas" and "Chicas Gordas" respectively. The labels were changed to Pepita in Hungary and to Elektra in the US, Canada, Australia, New Zealand and Japan. The Polish issue had the label of Tonpress and either "Spread Your Wings" or nothing on the B-side. Both 7-inch and 12-inch records were issued in the US; there the song also appeared in 1979, on the B-side of the single "Crazy Little Thing Called Love". In nearly all countries, the covers featured a backside photo of a naked woman on a racing bike, with a red bikini painted over the original photo. A brassiere was added to the US covers.

== Personnel ==
- Freddie Mercury – lead and backing vocals, piano, bicycle bells
- Brian May – guitars, backing vocals, bicycle bells
- Roger Taylor – drums, backing vocals, bicycle bells
- John Deacon – bass guitar, bicycle bells

== Chart performance ==
Country	Peak position	Held during	Charted for (weeks)
Argentina (CAPIF)	10	Feb 1979	7
Australia (Kent Music Report)	28		9
Austria	21	Jan 1979	4
Belgium	15	Jan 1979	5
France	7	November – December 1978	11
Germany	27	11–18 Dec 1978	12
Ireland (IRMA)	10		7
New Zealand	20		8
Netherlands (Dutch Top 40)	5	25 Nov – 2 Dec 1978	11
Norway	7		9
Portugal	9	3 February 1979	2
UK Singles (OCC)	11	25 Nov – 9 Dec 1978	11
US Billboard	24	Jan 1979	12

== Certifications ==
Region	Certification	Certified units/sales
New Zealand (RMNZ)	Gold	15,000^{‡}
United States (RIAA)	Platinum	1,000,000^{‡}
^{‡} Sales+streaming figures based on certification alone.

== Sample ==
The song's chorus was sampled by Eminem in "C'mon Let Me Ride" by Skylar Grey.

== Alternate artwork ==
A bicycle race with nude women was held to promote the Jazz album, the single and the "Fat Bottomed Girls" single. This photo was included as a fold-out poster with the album Jazz. It was also included as an alternate single cover.
