= The Complete Works (Queen album) =

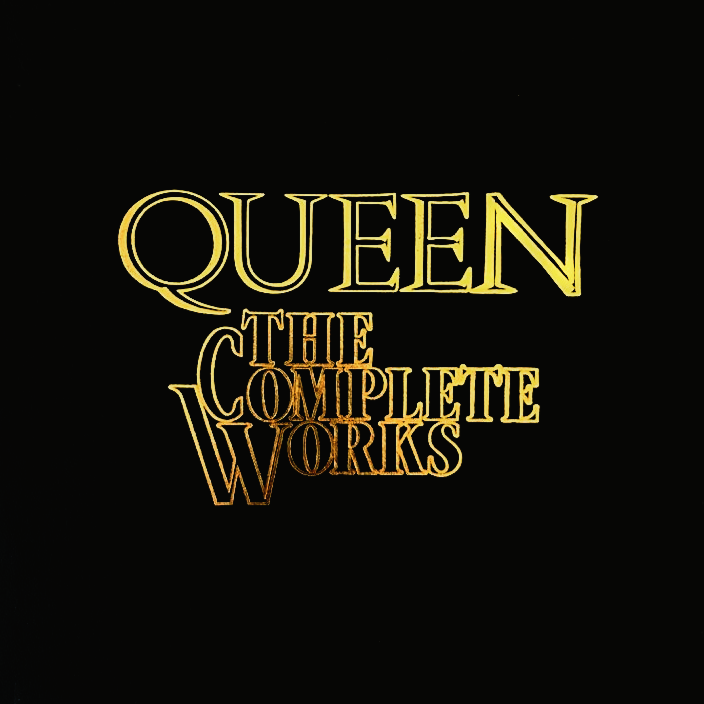

Box set by Queen
- Released: 2 December 1985
- Recorded: December 1971 – September 1985
- Genre: Rock
- Length: 9:21:09
- Label: EMI (UK)

Queen chronology
The Works (1984)	The Complete Works (1985)	A Kind of Magic (1986)

The Complete Works is a box set issued by the rock band Queen in 1985. It contained all of the band's original studio albums, live album and non-album tracks to that point. It was available in vinyl format only.

== History ==
Following the 1985 Live Aid concert, Queen found themselves in a creative period. While spending only 20+ minutes onstage before the whole world, it was almost universally felt that Queen had stolen the show. In the wake of this unexpected turn, Mercury called on the other band members, to go into the studio and record a song together. Until this point, all but a handful of songs were written by the individual members (and occasional duo-songwriting credits): "Stone Cold Crazy", "Under Pressure" (with David Bowie) and "Soul Brother". The result of this enthusiastic session was "One Vision" and its remixed B-side "Blurred Vision" being released as a single worldwide.

On 2 December, EMI Records released what was then the definitive Queen boxed set: all of Queen's 11 original studio albums, their live album Live Killers, and an extra disc titled Complete Vision, which contained all the non-album A-sides and B-sides to that point. The band signed only 600 copies (on the Complete Vision sleeve), which have now become collector's items. This was a 14 LP box. In addition, the box included two books, the first with all the albums' front cover artwork, track listings and album credits together with individual pictures of the band members; the other included a world tour itinerary up to that time, showing a list of equipment they carried with them. Also included was a colour world map showing where Queen played and charted. Each album was digitally remastered and re-sleeved in white with an embossed crest and gold Roman numerals.

Not included in the box were their 1981 Greatest Hits compilation, as well as versions and edits of tracks used for single releases worldwide. Queen released four studio albums after The Complete Works; A Kind of Magic (1986), The Miracle (1989), Innuendo (1991) and Made in Heaven (1995).

== Album listing ==
1. Queen (1973) – 38:47
2. Queen II (1974) – 40:47
3. Sheer Heart Attack (1974) – 39:02
4. A Night at the Opera (1975) – 43:03
5. A Day at the Races (1976) – 44:22
6. News of the World (1977) – 39:20
7. Jazz (1978) – 44:47
8. Live Killers Vol. 1 (1979) – 47:08
9. Live Killers Vol. 2 – 43:10
10. The Game (1980) – 35:38
11. Flash Gordon (1980) – 35:08
12. Hot Space (1982) – 43:42
13. The Works (1984) – 37:35
14. Complete Vision (additional LP) – 28:40

== Complete Vision ==
Complete Vision is a bonus LP that came with the Complete Works boxed set in 1985 and tidied up the non-album A-sides and B-sides at the time. Both 33 rpm and 45 rpm versions of the album exist.

=== Complete Vision track listing ===
1. "See What a Fool I've Been" – 4:29
2. "A Human Body" – 3:42
3. "Soul Brother" – 3:38
4. "I Go Crazy" – 3:43
5. "Thank God It's Christmas" – 4:22
6. "One Vision" (single version) – 4:04
7. "Blurred Vision" – 4:42
