= Mustapha (song) =

- German single picture sleeve

Single by Queen

from the album Jazz
- B-side: "Dead on Time" (Germany); "In Only Seven Days" (Yugoslavia)
- Released: April 1979 (Germany)
- Recorded: 1978
- Genre: Progressive rock; hard rock; art rock
- Length: 3:01
- Label: EMI
- Songwriter: Freddie Mercury
- Producers: Queen; Roy Thomas Baker

Queen singles chronology
| "Don't Stop Me Now" (1979) | "Mustapha" (1979) | "Love of My Life (Live at Festhalle Frankfurt, 2 Feb '79)" (1979) |

"Mustapha" is a song written by Freddie Mercury and recorded by British rock band Queen. It is the first track of their 1978 album Jazz, categorized as "an up-tempo Arabic rocker" by Circus magazine.

== Single ==
"Mustapha" was released as a single in Germany, Spain, Yugoslavia and Bolivia in 1979. The B-side of the single was "Dead on Time" for German and Spanish releases and "In Only Seven Days" for Yugoslavian and Bolivian releases. Also, all four versions had different covers.

== Lyrics ==
The composition's lyrics are mainly in English and Arabic, repeating the word Allah, the Arabic word for God used by Muslims and Arab Christians. It also uses a sentence in Persian-emulating gibberish, reflecting Mercury's Parsi background. The lyrics repeat the names Mustapha and Ibrahim. The lyrics also repeat the phrase "Allah will pray for you." Parts of the lyrics like "Achtar es na sholei" meaning "His star, not his flame" have clear ties to the Persian language.

== Personnel ==
- Freddie Mercury – lead and backing vocals, piano
- Brian May – guitars
- Roger Taylor – drums, hawk bells
- John Deacon – bass guitar
