= Berre-les-Alpes =

Commune in Provence-Alpes-Côte d'Azur, France

Berre-les-Alpes Bèrra (Occitan)
- Commune
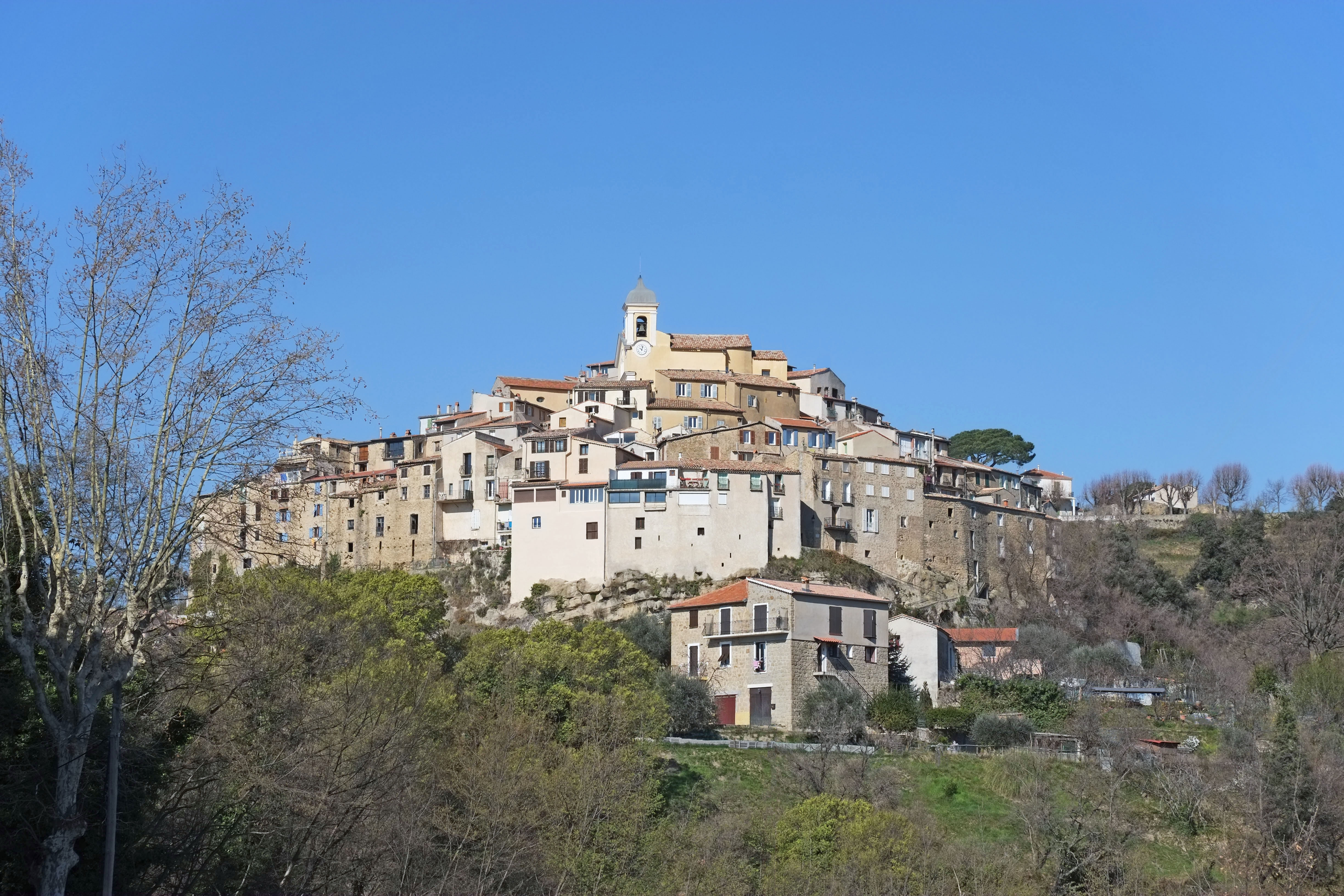
- A general view of the village

- Coat of arms
- Location of Berre-les-Alpes
- Location within France Location within Provence-Alpes-Côte d'Azur
- Coordinates: 43°49′51″N 7°19′47″E
- Country: France
- Region: Provence-Alpes-Côte d'Azur
- Department: Alpes-Maritimes
- Arrondissement: Nice
- Canton: Contes
- Intercommunality: Pays des Paillons

Government
  - Mayor (2026–32): Martine Brun
- Area^{1}: 9.58 km^{2} (3.70 sq mi)
- Elevation: 682 m (2,238 ft)
- Highest elevation: 816 m (2,677 ft)
- Lowest elevation: 237 m (778 ft)
- Population (2023): 1,316
  - Density: 137/km^{2} (356/sq mi)
- Demonym: Berrois
- Time zone: UTC+01:00 (CET)
  - Summer (DST): UTC+02:00 (CEST)
- INSEE/Postal code: 06015 /06390
- ^{1} French Land Register data, which excludes lakes, ponds, glaciers > 1 km^{2} (0.386 sq mi or 247 acres) and river estuaries.

Berre-les-Alpes (French pronunciation: [bɛʁ le.z‿alp]; Occitan: Bèrra; Italian: Berra, formerly, although still in use in Niçard) is a rural commune in the Alpes-Maritimes department in the southeastern Provence-Alpes-Côte d'Azur region in France.

== Toponymy ==
By a decree of 22 December 1997, Berre-des-Alpes became Berre-les-Alpes.

== Geography ==
"The superb national road from Nice to Coni by the Escarène and Sospel, detaches a path of common interest along the col de Saint-Roch, or the pass of Nice, which follows the sinuosities of the hill over a length of four kilometers. After making two-thirds of the journey, you can see the picturesque and charming village of Berre-des-Alpes, leaning against the end of a plateau at 680 meters above sea level", wrote Jean Truchi in the 1899 issue of Nice-Historique.

The village of Berre-les-Alpes, located 23 kilometers north of Nice, following the Paillon, the road that passes through Contes, rises to 682 meters above sea level on a summit rising on the edge of a high plateau. The map of the county of Nice established by Bourcet in 1749 names the place "the Black Wood". The soil of the commune is composed of land belonging to the secondary and tertiary eras, more precisely of the Cretaceous and Eocene periods.

Berre is located at the altitude limit where the chestnut tree replaces the olive tree. Below the road leading to Berre olive groves are plentiful, while around the village forests of chestnut trees stretch out and mimosa and pine are everywhere.

The village square dominates the two valleys of Contes and Escarène. The village is a belvedere from which the observer's gaze embraces from the north-west to the south the chain of Ferrion (887 m), the village of Châteauneuf-de-Contes and the ruins of its castle, Mount Macaron, the villages of Contes and Sclos-de-Contes. Going up from the south, on the east side, the observer discovers part of Mount Gros, Mount Leuze, Dog Head (504 m), Mount Agel (1,100 m) and Baudon Peak (1,264 m) . To the north-east, the Braus Pass (1.002 m), the St. Lawrence River, Mount Pissandroun, the Escarène with its station, then further north, Mount Brec (983 m), Mount Pivola 803 m), Mount Pifourquier, Gros Braus (1,330 m), Mount du Rocaillon with Lucéram village, Turini forests, Authion (2,000 m), part of the Mount Bego (2,873 m), the Devil's summit (2,686 m), the two Capeliets mountains (2,418 m and 2,686 m), the Saint-Roch pass (990 m), the Savel summit (1,015 m), Roca Seira (1,504 m) and, at the bottom, Mount Gelas (3,143 m).

=== Climate ===
Climate data for Berre-les-Alpes(1981-2010), altitude: 715 m
Month	Jan	Feb	Mar	Apr	May	Jun	Jul	Aug	Sep	Oct	Nov	Dec	Year
Mean daily maximum °C (°F)	10.2 (50.4)	11.0 (51.8)	13.8 (56.8)	15.6 (60.1)	20.9 (69.6)	24.8 (76.6)	28.0 (82.4)	28.4 (83.1)	23.2 (73.8)	18.5 (65.3)	13.3 (55.9)	10.5 (50.9)	18.2 (64.7)
Daily mean °C (°F)	6.8 (44.2)	7.2 (45.0)	9.6 (49.3)	11.4 (52.5)	16.3 (61.3)	19.8 (67.6)	22.8 (73.0)	23.1 (73.6)	18.6 (65.5)	14.7 (58.5)	10.0 (50.0)	7.3 (45.1)	14.0 (57.1)
Mean daily minimum °C (°F)	3.4 (38.1)	3.4 (38.1)	5.5 (41.9)	7.3 (45.1)	11.7 (53.1)	14.9 (58.8)	17.5 (63.5)	17.9 (64.2)	14.1 (57.4)	11.0 (51.8)	6.7 (44.1)	4.1 (39.4)	9.8 (49.6)
Average precipitation mm (inches)	66.1 (2.60)	40.2 (1.58)	37.8 (1.49)	69.3 (2.73)	47.1 (1.85)	39.9 (1.57)	21.1 (0.83)	28.4 (1.12)	89.8 (3.54)	117.8 (4.64)	118.8 (4.68)	84.5 (3.33)	760.8 (29.96)
Average precipitation days (≥ 1 mm)	5.5	3.4	4.9	8.5	6.6	4.4	3.7	3.2	6.2	8.5	7.6	6	68.5
Source: Infoclimat

== Music ==
In 1978, the British rock band Queen recorded part of their album Jazz, including the hit single "Don't Stop Me Now", at Super Bear recording studios in Berre-les-Alpes. The studio was also where Kate Bush recorded the entirety of Lionheart (1978) and Pink Floyd recorded portions of The Wall (1979).

== Demographics ==
Historical population
Year	Pop.	±% p.a.
1968	570	—
1975	819	+5.31%
1982	949	+2.13%
1990	857	−1.27%
1999	1,162	+3.44%
2007	1,261	+1.03%
2012	1,278	+0.27%
2017	1,253	−0.39%
2023	1,316	+0.82%
Source: INSEE

== See also ==
- Communes of the Alpes-Maritimes department
