= Vesti la giubba =

Aria from the opera Pagliacci by Ruggero Leoncavallo

Song
- Published: 1892 by Sonzogno
- Genre: Opera
- Songwriter: Ruggero Leoncavallo
- "Vesti la giubba" Performed by Enrico Caruso, recorded on March 17, 1907

"Vesti la giubba" (Italian: [ˈvɛsti la ˈdʒubba], "Put on the costume", often referred to as "On With the Motley", from the original 1893 translation by Frederic Edward Weatherly) is a tenor aria from Ruggero Leoncavallo's 1892 opera Pagliacci. "Vesti la giubba" is sung at the conclusion of the first act, when Canio discovers his wife's infidelity, but must nevertheless prepare for his performance as Pagliaccio the clown because "the show must go on".

The aria is often regarded as one of the most moving in the operatic repertoire of the time. The pain of Canio is portrayed in the aria and exemplifies the entire notion of the "tragic clown": smiling on the outside but crying on the inside. This is still displayed today, as the clown motif often features the painted-on tear running down the cheek of the performer.

Enrico Caruso's recordings of the aria, from 1902, 1904 and 1907, were among the top selling records of the 78-rpm era and reached over a million sales.

This aria is often used in popular culture, and has been featured in many renditions, mentions, and spoofs.

== Libretto ==
Giovanni Martinelli, Tenor of the N.Y. Metropolitan Opera Company in "Vesti la giubba" from the Opera "I Pagliacci" by Leoncavallo

Recitar! Mentre preso dal delirio,
non so più quel che dico,
e quel che faccio!
Eppur è d'uopo, sforzati!
Bah! Sei tu forse un uom?
Tu se' Pagliaccio!

Vesti la giubba e la faccia infarina.
La gente paga, e rider vuole qua.
E se Arlecchin t'invola Colombina,
ridi, Pagliaccio, e ognun applaudirà!
Tramuta in lazzi lo spasmo ed il pianto
in una smorfia il singhiozzo e 'l dolor, Ah!

Ridi, Pagliaccio,
sul tuo amore infranto!
Ridi del duol, che t'avvelena il cor!

Act! While in delirium,
I no longer know what I say,
or what I do!
And yet it's necessary. Force yourself!
Bah! Are you even a man?
You are a clown!

Put on your costume and powder your face.
The people are paying, and they want to laugh here.
And if Harlequin steals away your Columbina,
laugh, clown, and all will applaud!
Turn your distress and tears into jokes,
your pain and sobs into a smirk, Ah!

Laugh, clown,
at your broken love!
Laugh at the grief that poisons your heart!

== In popular culture ==
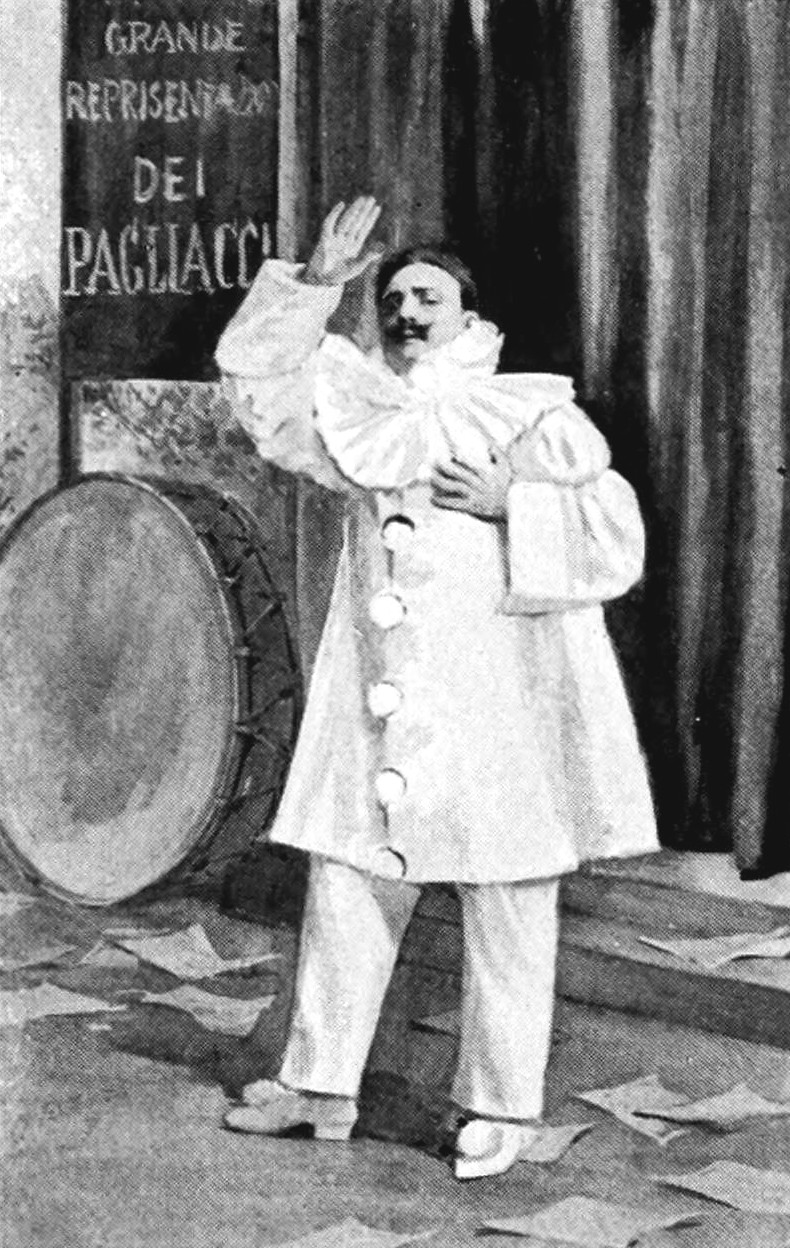
Caruso sings "Vesti la giubba"

- The aria is heard in the accident scene of the movie Urban Ghost Story (1998).
- Both the melody of the aria and dramatic points of the opera from which it comes are referenced by Homer and Jethro in the 1953 Spike Jones song "Pal Yat Chee" on RCA Victor
- The melody is set to lyrics about Kellogg's Rice Krispies breakfast cereal in an American television commercial for that product, circa 1970.
- In a Sesame Street sketch from 1982, José Carreras performs an English version of "Vesti la giubba" with rewritten lyrics about Ernie losing his Rubber Duckie, while Ernie mimes along. At the end of the aria, Carreras bursts into tears, and Ernie consoles him saying, "I didn't really lose my Rubber Duckie", upon which he produces it and offers Carreras to squeeze it. Carreras squeezes the Rubber Duckie and confesses that he feels "much better", upon which Ernie retorts, "Give me back my duck!".
- The melody of the song was used by the rock band Queen in their 1984 single "It's a Hard Life" when frontman Freddie Mercury sang that song's opening lyrics "I don't want my freedom, there's no reason for living with a broken heart."
- The aria is heard several times in the 1992 Seinfeld episode "The Opera", including over the episode's end credits instead of the Seinfeld theme.
- The opera is performed in The Simpsons episode "The Italian Bob" (2005) in which Sideshow Bob sings the final verse of the aria.
- The aria is played in the 2001 video game Twisted Metal: Black within the story of the contestant No-Face, also known as Frank "The Tank" McCutcheon.
- The aria is featured in the 2005 video game Grand Theft Auto: Liberty City Stories as part of the fictional classic music radio station Double Cleff FM.
- Verses from the aria are used in both Italian and English in the song "A Metaphor for the Dead" by the metal band Anaal Nathrakh on their 2012 album Vanitas.
- In the show Harvey Birdman, Attorney at Law, the final verse is sung by rival lawyer Evelyn Spyro Throckmorton in the episode "The Dabba Don"
- In The Untouchables, the aria is used as a backdrop for Treasury agent Malone's murder, and is ironically "illustrated" with Capone's displaying both tears (at the emotional opera performance) and laughter (upon learning that another of Elliot Ness's task-force has been eliminated).
- In the SpongeBob SquarePants episode "The Two Faces of Squidward", the song plays when a falling shoe is about to land on Squidward's head and SpongeBob pushes him out of the way, accidentally hitting a wooden pole.
- In the Season 18 Family Guy episode Heart Burn during the Fatal Attraction parody, the No More Rice Krispies parody of the song plays twice.
- In The Ren & Stimpy Show episode "My Shiny Friend", the song plays when Ren is crying over the thought of losing Stimpy to the TV.
- In the movie Cabrini, the famous solo is sung by Rolando Villazón playing Enrico Caruso.
- In the Nervous Mob Boss sketch of Key & Peele, the aria plays when the mob boss enters the house which emphasizes the dramatic turning point of the whole sketch.
