= The Works (Queen album) =

Studio album by Queen
- Released: 20 February 1984
- Recorded: August 1983 – January 1984
- Studios: Record Plant (Los Angeles, California, US); Musicland (Munich, West Germany)
- Genres: Hard rock; pop rock; electropop; synth-pop; stadium rock
- Length: 37:15
- Labels: EMI; Capitol
- Producers: Queen; Reinhold Mack

Queen chronology
Hot Space (1982)	The Works (1984)	The Complete Works (1985)

Queen studio album chronology
Hot Space (1982)	The Works (1984)	A Kind of Magic (1986)

Singles from The Works
- 1. "Radio Ga Ga" Released: 23 January 1984; 2. "I Want to Break Free" Released: 2 April 1984; 3. "It's a Hard Life" Released: 16 July 1984; 4. "Hammer to Fall" Released: 10 September 1984

The Works is the eleventh studio album by the British rock band Queen. It was released on 20 February 1984 in the US and on 27 February 1984 in the UK by EMI Records just shortly after recording for the album had been completed in the United Kingdom and it is the band's first studio album to be released by Capitol Records in the United States. After the synth-heavy Hot Space (1982), the album saw the re-emergence of Brian May & Roger Taylor's rock sound, while still incorporating the early 80s retrofuturistic electronic music (at the behest of Freddie Mercury) and New York funk scenes (John Deacon's topic of interest). Recorded at the Record Plant Studios in Los Angeles, California, and Musicland Studios in Munich, Germany, from August 1983 to January 1984, the album's title comes from a comment Taylor made as recording began – "Let's give them the works!".

During the decade, after a negative reaction to the music video for "I Want to Break Free" in the United States, the band decided not to tour in North America and lost the top spot in US sales, but sales around the world would be much better, especially in Europe. Despite failing to reach number one, it spent 94 weeks on the UK Albums Chart, the longest for a Queen studio album. The Works has sold over six million copies worldwide.

== Background and recording ==
Following the release and subsequent touring of the 1982 album Hot Space, Queen opted to take a break the following year. While a spring tour of South America had been an early possibility, especially in light of the band's success there two years earlier, equipment and promotional problems brought an end to these plans. During this period, Brian May worked with Eddie Van Halen and others on the Star Fleet Project, whilst Roger Taylor and Freddie Mercury began work on their solo albums, Strange Frontier and Mr. Bad Guy respectively. By August 1983, the band reunited and began work on their eleventh studio album. It would be Queen's first album for EMI Records (and its US affiliate Capitol Records) worldwide after the band nullified its recording deal with Elektra for the United States, Canada, Australia and Japan.

Recording commenced at Record Plant Studios in Los Angeles – Queen's only time recording in the United States – and Musicland Studios in Munich. Also during this time, their manager Jim Beach offered them the opportunity to compose the soundtrack for the film The Hotel New Hampshire. The band agreed, but soon discovered much of their time was being spent on the soundtrack instead of the upcoming album, and the soundtrack project fell through. Only one song written for the film – "Keep Passing the Open Windows" – made it onto The Works. By November 1983, Roger Taylor's "Radio Ga Ga" was chosen as the first single from the album.

== Songs ==
=== Side one ===
==== "Radio Ga Ga" ====
The Works opens with "Radio Ga Ga", written and composed on keyboards by Roger Taylor after he heard his 3-year-old son Felix say "radio ca ca". He wrote it in Los Angeles and locked himself in the studio with a Roland Jupiter 8 and a drum machine. Afterwards John Deacon came up with a suitable bass line. Freddie Mercury reconstructed the track, both musically and lyrically. It was still credited to Taylor since Mercury was an arranger rather than a co-writer. Fred Mandel, their session keyboardist, put together an additive track with piano, synth and a temporary bass part. Brian May used a glass slide for his guitar solo. Taylor sang all the backing vocals, and used a vocoder throughout the song. Most of the song is made out of electronics and synthesisers.

==== "Tear It Up" ====
"Tear It Up" was written by Brian May as an attempt to revive Queen's old sound, notably featuring riffs from the intro to the song "Liar". When performed live during The Magic Tour, May would skip to the intro from "Liar" then go into the beginning of the song. It features stomping percussion similar to "We Will Rock You". The demo features May doing the vocals instead of Mercury.

While not released as a single, "Tear It Up" received significant airplay on AOR stations in the United States, peaking at #52 on the Billboard Mainstream Rock chart.

==== "It's a Hard Life" ====
"It's a Hard Life" was written by Mercury. May and Taylor have stated it as one of their favourite songs of Mercury's, although Taylor admitted his vast displeasure with the video. May contributed with some of the lyrics, and the intro was based on Ruggiero Leoncavallo's "Vesti la giubba", an aria from his opera Pagliacci. Mercury played piano and did most of the vocals, and instructed May about the scales he should use for the solo, described by May in the guitar programme Star Licks as very "Bohemian Rhapsody"-esque.

==== "Man on the Prowl" ====
"Man on the Prowl" is a three-chord rockabilly Mercury composition. May played the solo using a Fender Telecaster whilst Mandel plays the piano ending. This was planned as the fifth and final single from the album, with a provisional release date of 19 November 1984. Promotional copies were pressed and sent out, but the band opted for the Christmas single "Thank God It's Christmas", on which the song appears as a B-side.

=== Side two ===
==== "Machines (Or 'Back to Humans')" ====
"Machines (Or 'Back to Humans')" came about as an idea by Taylor, and May collaborated with him and finished it. Producer Reinhold Mack programmed the synth-"demolition" using a Fairlight CMI II Sampler, and all the vocals are sung by the group's three vocalists, including Mercury and May singing in harmony and Taylor performing the robotic voices (using a Roland VP-330 Vocoder). The instrumental remix of the song samples parts of "Ogre Battle" from Queen's second album Queen II, "Flash" and Larry Lurex's "Goin' Back". This song, along with "Radio Ga Ga", are some of the heaviest uses of electronics on the album. It was released as a digital single on 10 November 2023.

==== "I Want to Break Free" ====
"I Want to Break Free", written by John Deacon, is best known because of its video, featuring all four Queen members crossdressed as women, in a parody of the British soap opera Coronation Street. The idea for the clip was Taylor's. Mercury commented that 'Everybody ran into their frocks'. Deacon, the song's author, insisted he didn't want a guitar solo on the track so a synth solo was played by Mandel – live, however, May played the solo on guitar. The version used for the single and the promotional video includes an opening and instrumental bridge (after the synth solo) not part of the original mix.

==== "Keep Passing the Open Windows" ====
"Keep Passing the Open Windows" was written by Mercury in 1983 for the film The Hotel New Hampshire, based on the novel by John Irving. The phrase is mentioned on a number of occasions throughout the film and was, according to the opening credits, also co-produced by the band's manager Jim Beach, who changed it in order to suit the album mood better. Mercury played piano and synths and wrote the lyrics after reading the quote in the book.

==== "Hammer to Fall" ====
"Hammer to Fall" is May's other rock song on the album. Live versions were considerably faster and he sang it in his solo tours as well. Synths are played by Mandel and most of the vocal harmonies were recorded by May himself, particularly in the bridge, except for the lyric "oh no" which is Taylor. The song harks back to Queen's old sound, with a song being built around a hard angular and muscular riff. The song features Mercury on lead vocals, doing a call and response with May, who sings the chorus. The song's music video, directed by David Mallet, contains footage of a performance of the song in Brussels. "Hammer to Fall" was a concert favourite, and was the third song the band performed at Live Aid in 1985. The song also features in both the setlist of the band's Works Tour and Magic Tour in 1986.

==== "Is This the World We Created...?" ====
The album concludes with "Is This the World We Created...?", which was written by Mercury and May in Munich after the two saw a news broadcast about poverty in Africa; the song was performed at Live Aid as an encore. Mercury wrote most of the lyrics and May wrote the chords and made small lyrical contributions. The song was recorded with an Ovation guitar, although when playing live May used Taylor's Gibson Chet Atkins CE nylon-stringed guitar. A piano was tracked at the recording sessions for this song, but ultimately not included in the final mix.

=== Unreleased songs and demos ===
The sessions for The Works were highly productive, resulting in an overwhelmingly large body of material written and recorded. Only nine of these were used on the album, but many of those remaining have been released in other forms.

==== "Coming On Far Too Strong" ====
Believed to originate from the Works sessions, this is a fast-paced track dominated by the piano and drums. Two versions of the demo exist and very little is known about the track. It is about a minute and a half long. At the end of the track, Mercury can be heard to say: "very good, ha, ha. It's gotta go somewhere, but it just, er, wasn't"; the rest of the dialogue is inaudible.

==== "I Dream of Christmas" ====
When Queen wanted to write a Christmas single in 1984, Taylor wrote the basics of "Thank God It's Christmas" while May wrote "I Dream of Christmas". The group then had to choose between the two, and opted for "Thank God It's Christmas", which May and Taylor then wrote together. It is rumoured that "I Dream of Christmas" was recorded by the band, though nothing has ever been confirmed. May later worked on "I Dream of Christmas" with his future wife Anita Dobson, which was released as a single in 1988 and also features John Deacon.

==== "I Go Crazy" ====
Written by May some time in 1981, the song was recorded during the Hot Space album sessions but never made it onto the final cut. It was instead used as the B-side to the single release of "Radio Ga Ga".

==== "Let Me in Your Heart Again" ====
Written by May, this song went through several rewrites and re-recordings before it was left unfinished and subsequently recorded by Anita Dobson, featuring May, for her 1988 album Talking of Love. In 2014, the band released a completed version of the song which features elements from a number of Queen demos of the track, with new backing vocals from May and Taylor, and new guitars from May on the album Queen Forever.

==== "Let Me Live" ====
"Let Me Live" was originally recorded by the band in 1983 as a duet between Mercury and Rod Stewart. It originally also featured Jeff Beck on guitar. The song was never released, although it was reworked by the band for inclusion in their 1995 studio album Made in Heaven, released after Mercury's death. The finished version features one verse and the chorus sung by Mercury, while the rest is sung by May and Taylor. It is unknown why the Stewart version was never used.

==== "Little Boogie" ====
Believed to originate from the Works sessions, this is an alternative piano version of "Coming on Far Too Strong". Nothing else is known about the track.

==== "Love Kills" ====
Written by Mercury and Giorgio Moroder, "Love Kills" was originally recorded for The Works, but was ultimately rejected. It was then reworked as a Mercury solo track for inclusion in Moroder's 1984 restoration and edit of the 1927 silent film Metropolis, and was also released as a single. The track was later remade into a Queen ballad and released on the 2014 album Queen Forever.

==== "Man Made Paradise" ====
This song was later re-recorded as a Mercury solo track and released on his 1985 solo album Mr. Bad Guy.

==== "Man on Fire" ====
"Man on Fire", written by Taylor, is believed to have been recorded in 1984 for The Works, before it was re-recorded and then released on Taylor's second solo album Strange Frontier that same year. An early promo cassette for The Works features a very different track listing, where its title appears. Nothing else is known about the track, or even whether a complete version exists.

==== "Thank God It's Christmas" ====
This track, written by May and Taylor, was eventually released as a Christmas single in 1984, and later appeared as the B-side to the "A Winter's Tale" single in 1995. It was also released as part of the 1999 compilation Greatest Hits III. It was the only Christmas song Queen recorded.

==== "There Must Be More to Life Than This" ====
Written by Mercury, this song was originally recorded by Mercury and Michael Jackson before being re-recorded by Queen in 1981 for their Hot Space album. The track was then going to be recorded to close The Works before Mercury and May wrote "Is This the World We Created...?". It was ultimately recorded as a solo track by Mercury and released on his 1985 solo album Mr. Bad Guy. In 2014, a reworked Queen version with a Mercury and Jackson duet was released on the album Queen Forever.

== Reception ==
Professional ratings
Review scores
Source	Rating
AllMusic	3/5 stars
Chicago Tribune	2/4 stars
Encyclopedia of Popular Music	4/5 stars
MusicHound Rock	3.5/5 stars
Rolling Stone	3/5 stars
The Rolling Stone Album Guide	2/5 stars
Sounds	3/4 stars

Rolling Stone's Parke Puterbaugh described it as their "first real album in some time" and as "a royal feast of hard rock". Sandy Robertson, in a three star review for Sounds, wrote "This time around, Queen have played it safe." In a retrospective review, Greg Prato of AllMusic felt that "while the songwriting had definitely improved" from its predecessor Hot Space, he also believed "the album sonically lacked the punch of such earlier releases as News of the World and The Game".

== Track listing ==
All lead vocals by Freddie Mercury.

Side one
No.	Title	Writer(s)	Length
1.	"Radio Ga Ga"	Roger Taylor	5:48
2.	"Tear It Up"	Brian May	3:28
3.	"It's A Hard Life"	Freddie Mercury	4:08
4.	"Man On The Prowl"	Mercury	3:28

Side two
No.	Title	Writer(s)	Length
5.	"Machines (Or 'Back To Humans')"	May; Taylor	5:10
6.	"I Want To Break Free"	John Deacon	3:20
7.	"Keep Passing The Open Windows"	Mercury	5:21
8.	"Hammer To Fall"	May	4:28
9.	"Is This The World We Created...?"	May; Mercury	2:13
Total length:			37:15

Bonus tracks (1991 Hollywood Records CD reissue)
No.	Title	Writer(s)	Length
10.	"I Go Crazy" (original B-side)	May	3:42
11.	"Radio Ga Ga" (extended version)	Taylor	6:50
12.	"I Want To Break Free" (extended mix)	Deacon	7:12
Total length:			54:19

Disc 2: Bonus EP (2011 Universal Music CD reissue)
No.	Title	Writer(s)	Length
1.	"I Go Crazy" (B-side to "Radio Ga Ga")	May	3:44
2.	"I Want To Break Free" (Single remix)	Deacon	4:18
3.	"Hammer To Fall" (Headbanger's mix)	May	5:18
4.	"Is This The World We Created...?" (Live in Rio, January 1985)	Mercury; May	3:03
5.	"It's A Hard Life" (Live in Rio, January 1985)	Mercury	4:26
6.	"Thank God It's Christmas" (Non-album single, November 1984)	May; Taylor	4:22
Total length:			25:11

Bonus videos (2011 iTunes deluxe edition)
No.	Title	Writer(s)	Length
7.	"Tear It Up" (Live at Wembley Stadium, 11 July 1986)	May	2:23
8.	"I Want To Break Free" (Live in Rio, January 1985)	Deacon	3:27
9.	"Radio Ga Ga" (promo video)	Taylor	5:54
Total length:			36:15

== Personnel ==
Information is based on Queen's Complete Works and on the album's Liner Notes Track numbering refers to CD and digital releases of the album.

Queen

- Freddie Mercury – lead vocals (all tracks), backing vocals (3–8), piano (3, 4, 7), synthesiser (1, 7), sampler (1)
- Brian May – electric guitar (except track 9), acoustic guitar (9), synthesiser (5), backing vocals (1–5, 7–8)
- Roger Taylor – acoustic and electronic drums (except track 9), percussion (2), drum machine (1, 5–6), vocoder (1, 5), backing vocals (1–3, 8), sampler (1), synthesiser (1, 5)
- John Deacon – bass guitar (except track 9), rhythm guitar (6), synthesiser (6)

Additional personnel

- Fred Mandel – piano finale (4), synthesiser arrangement, synthesiser programming (1), synthesiser (1, 6, 8), candy-floss instruments (8)
- Reinhold Mack – Fairlight CMI programming (5), recording engineer
- Mike Beiriger – additional recording engineer
- Eddie DeLena – assistant recording engineer
- Stefan Wissnet – assistant recording engineer
- Bill Smith – sleeve design
- George Hurrell – photography

== Singles ==
For the first and only time in their career, all the songs (and one non-album track, "I Go Crazy") from a Queen album were used as either A-sides or B-sides on singles. Starting with this album, the group began issuing singles in the UK under their own catalogue numbers.

Number	Format	A-side	B-side	Release date (UK)
QUEEN 1	(7" single)	"Radio Ga Ga"	"I Go Crazy"	—
12QUEEN 1	(12" single)	"Radio Ga Ga" (extended version)	"Radio Ga Ga" (instrumental version)/"I Go Crazy"	23 January 1984
QUEEN 2	(7" single)	"I Want to Break Free" (single mix)	"Machines (or 'Back to Humans')"	—
12QUEEN 2	(12" single)	"I Want to Break Free" (extended mix)	"Machines (or 'Back to Humans')"	2 April 1984
QUEEN 3	(7" single)	"It's a Hard Life"	"Is This the World We Created...?"	—
12QUEEN 3	(12" single)	"It's a Hard Life"	"Is This the World We Created...?"	16 July 1984
QUEEN 4	(7" single)	"Hammer to Fall" (Headbanger's Mix Edit)	"Tear It Up"	—
12QUEEN 4	(12" single)	"Hammer to Fall" (Headbanger's Mix)	"Tear It Up"	10 September 1984
QUEEN 5	(7" single)	"Thank God It's Christmas" (non-album track)	"Man on the Prowl"/"Keep Passing the Open Windows"	—
12QUEEN 5	(12" single)	"Thank God It's Christmas"	"Man on the Prowl" (extended version)/"Keep Passing the Open Windows" (extended version)	26 November 1984

=== Others ===
Format	A-side	B-side
US 7" single & cassette single	"Radio Ga Ga" (US single edit)	"I Go Crazy"
US promo 7" single	"I Want to Break Free" (single mix)	"I Want to Break Free" (special 7" single edit)
US 7" single & cassette single	"I Want to Break Free" (single mix)	"Machines (or 'Back to Humans')" (instrumental version)

== Charts ==
=== Weekly charts ===
Chart (1984)	Peak position
Australian Albums (Kent Music Report)	16
Austrian Albums (Ö3 Austria)	2
Canada Top Albums/CDs (RPM)	22
Dutch Albums (Album Top 100)	1
European Top 100 Albums Chart	2
Finnish Albums (The Official Finnish Charts)	7
French Albums (SNEP)	14
German Albums (Offizielle Top 100)	3
Italian Albums (Musica e Dischi)	4
Japanese Albums (Oricon)	7
New Zealand Albums (RMNZ)	9
Norwegian Albums (VG-lista)	2
Swedish Albums (Sverigetopplistan)	3
Swiss Albums (Schweizer Hitparade)	3
UK Albums (Official Charts)	2
US Billboard 200	23

=== Year-end charts ===
1984 year-end chart performance for The Works
Chart (1984)	Position
Australian Albums Chart	48
Austrian Albums Chart	2
Canadian Albums Chart	88
Dutch Albums Charts	12
French Albums Chart	21
Italian Albums Chart	37
New Zealand Albums Chart	45
Swiss Albums Chart	3
UK Albums Chart	14
US AOR (Radio & Records)	72
West German Albums Chart	10

=== Decade-end charts ===
Decade-end chart performance for The Works
Chart (1980–89)	Position
Austrian Albums Chart	32

== Certifications and sales ==
Certifications and sales for The Works
Region	Certification	Certified units/sales
Australia (ARIA)	Platinum	100,000
Austria (IFPI Austria)	Platinum	50,000^{*}
Brazil (Pro-Música Brasil)	Gold	100,000^{*}
Canada (Music Canada)	Platinum	100,000^{^}
Denmark (IFPI Danmark)	Gold	10,000^{‡}
France (SNEP)	Gold	100,000
Germany (BVMI)	Platinum	500,000^{^}
Italy (FIMI) sales + streams since 2009	Platinum	50,000^{‡}
Netherlands (NVPI)	Gold	50,000^{^}
Poland (ZPAV) 2008 Agora SA album reissue	Platinum	20,000^{*}
South Africa (RISA)	3× Gold	75,000^{*}
Spain (Promusicae)	Gold	50,000^{^}
Switzerland (IFPI Switzerland)	Platinum	50,000^{^}
United Kingdom (BPI)	Platinum	300,000^{^}
United States (RIAA)	Gold	500,000^{^}
^{*} Sales figures based on certification alone.^{^} Shipments figures based on certification alone.^{‡} Sales+streaming figures based on certification alone.
