= The Works Tour =

1984–1985 concert tour by Queen

- World tour by Queen
- Poster to the extra concert in Brussels
- Location: Asia; Europe; Oceania; South Africa; South America
- Associated album: The Works
- Start date: 24 August 1984
- End date: 15 May 1985
- Legs: 5
- No. of shows: 48

Queen concert chronology
- Hot Space Tour (1982); The Works Tour (1984–1985); The Magic Tour (1986)

The Works Tour was the tenth headlining concert tour by the British rock band Queen to promote their successful 1984 album The Works. During the tour, Queen participated in the Rock in Rio festival in 1985; the concert was released on VHS. The band released a DVD from a concert in Tokyo titled We Are the Champions: Final Live in Japan, but the name of the concert was incorrect as the band performed two further concerts after Tokyo in Nagoya and Osaka.

== Background ==
The stage design was based on a scene from Fritz Lang's Metropolis with huge rotating cog-wheels at the rear of the stage and a brightly lit cityscape. Due to a prior ligament damage in his knee, it was somewhat of a challenge for Mercury to navigate the complex set of multiple levels and stairs. Eventually near the end of the European tour in Hanover, Mercury fell down the stairs during the performance of "Hammer to Fall". He was only able to play "Bohemian Rhapsody", "We Will Rock You", and "We Are the Champions" afterwards, shortening the concert somewhat. Due to Mercury's injury, May played the first bars of "We Will Rock You" out of anxiety to get Mercury to the hospital.

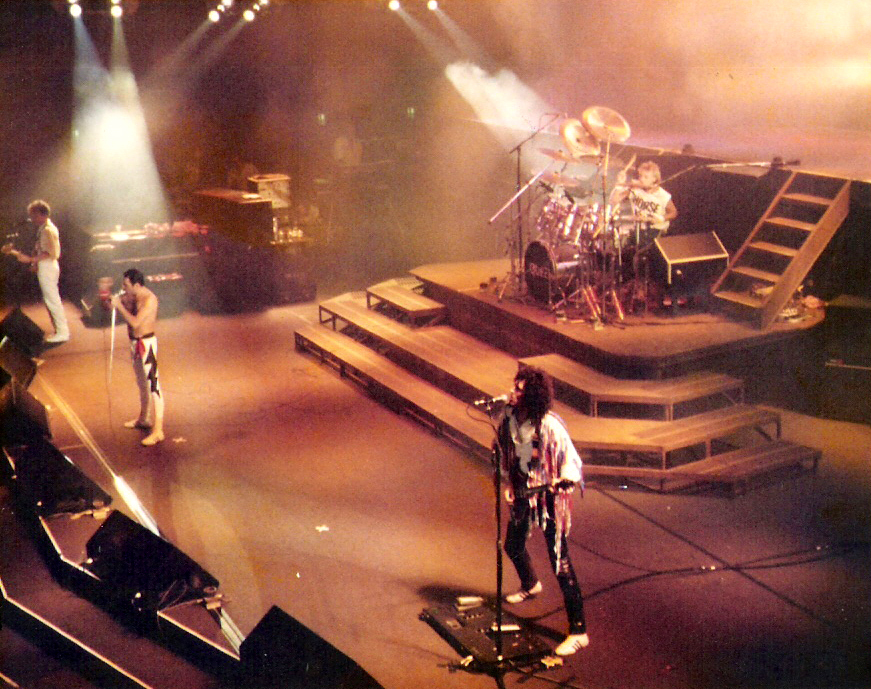
Queen performing at the Festhalle Frankfurt on 26 September 1984

The band revived older songs for the setlist, some of which had not been performed for close to a decade such as Seven Seas of Rhye and Great King Rat. Keep Yourself Alive returned to the set after being absent for the Hot Space Tour as part of the band's medley. Somebody to Love also joined this medley after being performed standalone most nights from 1977. Saturday Night's Alright For Fighting, a song by Elton John, would also be improvised on several nights of the tour.

Queen scheduled 12 performances in Bophuthatswana, South Africa, at the Sun City Super Bowl in October 1984. Due to the apartheid policy of South Africa, the United Nations requested entertainers to boycott the country and Britain's Musicians’ Union banned any of its members from performing in Sun City. Queen played anyway, despite the controversy, though several shows were cancelled after Mercury's voice gave out after three days of live performances. He was given steroids to help his ailing voice, and the tour leg was extended to include a third weekend.

The band performed two sold-out shows in at the Rock in Rio Festival, on the 11th and 18th of January 1985, but given that they went on after midnight, they technically performed on the 12th and 19th of January, respectively. After this, Queen would perform their only show in Auckland, with Tony Hadley of Spandau Ballet joining the band for Jailhouse Rock. After performing their final Australian leg, the band would play five shows in Japan. Their final show in Tokyo was released on VHS and Laserdisc as We Are The Champions: Final Live in Japan. The band would play two more shows in Nagoya and Osaka before ending the tour.

== Tour dates ==
List of 1984 concerts
Date	City	Country	Venue	Opening acts
24 August 1984	Brussels	Belgium	Forest National	—N/a
28 August 1984	Dublin	Ireland	RDS Arena	General Public
29 August 1984	Dublin	Ireland	RDS Arena	General Public
31 August 1984	Birmingham	England	NEC Arena	General Public
1 September 1984	Birmingham	England	NEC Arena	General Public
2 September 1984	Birmingham	England	NEC Arena	General Public
4 September 1984	London	England	Wembley Arena	General Public
5 September 1984	London	England	Wembley Arena	General Public
7 September 1984	London	England	Wembley Arena	General Public
8 September 1984	London	England	Wembley Arena	General Public
10 September 1984 (Note: The 10 September 1984 concert in Dortmund was originally scheduled for 11 September 1984.)	Dortmund	West Germany	Westfalenhallen	Lancelot
14 September 1984 (Note: The 14 September 1984 concert in Milan was originally scheduled to take place at Palazzo dello Sport in Rome.)	Milan	Italy	Palasport di San Siro	—N/a
15 September 1984	Milan	Italy	Palasport di San Siro	—N/a
16 September 1984	Munich	West Germany	Olympiahalle	—N/a
18 September 1984	Paris	France	Palais Omnisports de Paris-Bercy	Airrace
20 September 1984	Leiden	Netherlands	Groenoordhallen	Airrace
21 September 1984	Brussels	Belgium	Forest National	Airrace
22 September 1984	Hanover	West Germany	Europahalle	Airrace
24 September 1984	West Berlin	West Germany	Deutschlandhalle	Airrace
26 September 1984	Frankfurt	West Germany	Festhalle Frankfurt	Airrace
27 September 1984	Stuttgart	West Germany	Hanns-Martin-Schleyer-Halle	Airrace
29 September 1984	Vienna	Austria	Wiener Stadthalle	Airrace
30 September 1984	Vienna	Austria	Wiener Stadthalle	Airrace
5 October 1984	Bophuthatswana	South Africa	Sun City Superbowl	—N/a
6 October 1984	Bophuthatswana	South Africa	Sun City Superbowl	—N/a
7 October 1984 (Note: The 7 October 1984 concert in Bophuthatswana was cancelled after three songs.)	Bophuthatswana	South Africa	Sun City Superbowl	—N/a
10 October 1984	Bophuthatswana	South Africa	Sun City Superbowl	—N/a
13 October 1984	Bophuthatswana	South Africa	Sun City Superbowl	—N/a
14 October 1984	Bophuthatswana	South Africa	Sun City Superbowl	—N/a
18 October 1984	Bophuthatswana	South Africa	Sun City Superbowl	—N/a
19 October 1984	Bophuthatswana	South Africa	Sun City Superbowl	—N/a
20 October 1984	Bophuthatswana	South Africa	Sun City Superbowl	—N/a

List of 1985 concerts
Date	City	Country	Venue	Opening acts
11 January 1985 (Note: The 11 and 18 January 1985 concerts in Rio de Janeiro were part of Rock in Rio.)	Rio de Janeiro	Brazil	City of Rock	—N/a
18 January 1985	Rio de Janeiro	Brazil	City of Rock	—N/a
13 April 1985 (Note: The 13 April 1985 concert in Auckland was originally scheduled to take place at Western Springs Stadium.)	Auckland	New Zealand	Mount Smart Stadium	The Narcs
16 April 1985	Melbourne	Australia	Melbourne Sports and Entertainment Centre	Sport of Kings
17 April 1985	Melbourne	Australia	Melbourne Sports and Entertainment Centre	Sport of Kings
19 April 1985	Melbourne	Australia	Melbourne Sports and Entertainment Centre	Sport of Kings
20 April 1985	Melbourne	Australia	Melbourne Sports and Entertainment Centre	Sport of Kings
25 April 1985	Sydney	Australia	Sydney Entertainment Centre	—N/a
26 April 1985	Sydney	Australia	Sydney Entertainment Centre	—N/a
28 April 1985	Sydney	Australia	Sydney Entertainment Centre	—N/a
29 April 1985	Sydney	Australia	Sydney Entertainment Centre	—N/a
8 May 1985	Tokyo	Japan	Nippon Budokan	—N/a
9 May 1985	Tokyo	Japan	Nippon Budokan	—N/a
11 May 1985	Tokyo	Japan	Yoyogi National Gymnasium	—N/a
13 May 1985	Nagoya	Japan	Aichi Prefectural Gymnasium	—N/a
15 May 1985	Osaka	Japan	Osaka-jō Hall	—N/a

=== Cancelled shows ===
Date	City	Country	Venue
12 September 1984	Verona	Italy	Verona Arena
19 September 1984	Leiden	Netherlands	Groenoordhallen
9 October 1984	Bophuthatswana	South Africa	Sun City Super Bowl
24 January 1985	Santiago	Chile	Estadio Nacional
25 January 1985	Santiago	Chile	Estadio Nacional
11 April 1985	Napier	New Zealand	McLean Park
14 April 1985	Christchurch	New Zealand	Queen Elizabeth II Park

== Personnel ==
Queen

- Freddie Mercury – lead vocals, piano, rhythm guitar (on "Crazy Little Thing Called Love")
- Brian May – electric and acoustic guitars, backing vocals
- Roger Taylor – drums, percussions, backing vocals
- John Deacon – bass guitar, rhythm guitar (on "Staying Power"), backing vocals

Additional musicians

- Spike Edney – keyboards, synthesizer, piano, backing vocals, rhythm guitar (on "Hammer to Fall")
