= Hammer to Fall =

1984 single by Queen

- UK single picture sleeve

Single by Queen

from the album The Works
- A-side: "Hammer to Fall" (Extended Version) (12" single only)
- B-side: "Tear It Up"
- Released: 10 September 1984 (UK); 12 October 1984 (US)
- Recorded: January 1984
- Genre: Hard rock; heavy metal
- Length: 4:28 (album version); 3:40 (single version); 5:25 (12" Headbanger's version); 3:44 (promotional music video version)
- Label: EMI (UK); Capitol (US)
- Songwriter: Brian May
- Producers: Queen; Reinhold Mack

Queen singles chronology
"It's a Hard Life" (1984)	"Hammer to Fall" (1984)	"Thank God It's Christmas" (1984)

Music video
- "Hammer to Fall" on YouTube

"Hammer to Fall" is a 1984 song by the British rock band Queen. Written by guitarist Brian May, the song is the eighth track on their 1984 album The Works. It was the fourth and final single to be released from that album, although the single version was edited down by thirty seconds from the version on the album. Different sleeves were used to package this single and the live picture sleeve is now a collector's item. The song harks back to the old roots of the band, being built around a hard angular and muscular riff.

The song peaked at number 13 in the UK Singles Chart. It was featured in the film Highlander, a movie for which the band had composed tie-in songs. The music video was filmed in Brussels during The Works Tour, and features drummer Roger Taylor wearing an oversized message T-shirt ("CHOOSE LIFE") created by Katharine Hamnett.

"Hammer to Fall" was the third song the band performed at Live Aid in 1985. The song features in the setlist of both The Works Tour and The Magic Tour. The full album version of the song appears on Queen Rocks while the single version appears on Greatest Hits II and Classic Queen.

== Interpretation ==
The question of the meaning of the song was effectively settled when May wrote on his website that "Hammer to Fall is really about life and death, and being aware of death as being part of life", and that "the Hammer coming down is only a symbol of the Grim Reaper doing his job!"

== Critical reception ==
Upon its release, Mark Putterford of Kerrang! stated, "At last! Brian May has plunged Queen's fingers back into the rock 'n' roll mains socket and charged up glorious memories of the band pre-'76. If 'Radio Ga Ga' made you puke, this riff-handed rocket will clear up the mess." He added that the B-side, "Tear It Up", is "another May kick up the 'jacksie'" and concluded the single is "bliss for old Queenie boppers like me". Vici MacDonald of Smash Hits was negative in her review, describing it as a release aiming for the "tinkle of cash registers" over "artistic integrity". She wrote, "Although Brian May's song [is] about as modern as his stage outfits (i.e. prehistoric), it's bound to be a monster hit. How depressing." Karen Swayne, writing for Number One, called it an "overblown, melodramatic piece of nothing" and believed it would "test the dedication of even those misguided souls [loyal Queen fans]".

In the US, Cash Box summarised, "With customary raw energy highlighted by the powerful vocals of Freddie Mercury and the unstoppable energy of guitarist/composer Brian May, Queen still exemplifies the essence of solid rock. The song itself offers nothing particularly new, but is performed energetically and contains more than enough of what Queen's fans have come to expect."

== Music video ==
The music video was directed by David Mallet, containing footage of a live performance of the song in Brussels during The Works Tour.

== Live performances ==
"Hammer to Fall" was the third song on the band's setlist at Live Aid, after "Bohemian Rhapsody" and "Radio Ga Ga". Live versions of the song in the 1980s also usually served as an opportunity for touring keyboardist Spike Edney to appear onstage playing rhythm guitar, as he was usually not visible from behind his keyboard stack. "Hammer to Fall" features in the setlist of both The Works Tour and The Magic Tour.

At the Freddie Mercury Tribute Concert in 1992, Extreme singer Gary Cherone performed the song with Queen and Tony Iommi of Black Sabbath, having previously done a medley of other Queen songs with his own group.

A different version of the song with the first part played in the style of a ballad was played by May on his 1998 solo tour promoting his second album Another World. This arrangement was revived for Queen + Paul Rodgers in 2005.

== In other media ==
- The song appears in the 1987 science fiction book The Tommyknockers by Stephen King.
- A portion of the song is heard during the scene with the well-armed Vietnam veteran in the 1986 film Highlander.
- A portion of the song is heard during a scene of the sixth episode of Netflix's Stranger Things second season.
- The song is heard in the 2018 biopic Bohemian Rhapsody where Queen's Live Aid performance is reenacted.
- The song is featured in the 2026 video game Grand Theft Auto VI

== Track listings ==
7" Single

- A Side. "Hammer to Fall" (Single Version) – 3:40
- B Side. "Tear It Up" – 3:24

12" Single

- A Side. "Hammer to Fall" (Extended Version) – 5:25
- B Side. "Tear It Up" – 3:24

== Personnel ==
- Freddie Mercury – lead and backing vocals
- Brian May – guitars, backing vocals
- Roger Taylor – drums, backing vocals
- John Deacon – bass guitar
- Fred Mandel – synthesizer

== Charts ==
=== Weekly charts ===
Chart (1984)	Peak position
Australia (Kent Music Report)	69
Poland (Lista Przebojów Programu Trzeciego)	24
United Kingdom (UK Singles Chart)	13
US Mainstream Rock (Billboard)	57

Chart (1992)	Peak position
US Mainstream Rock Airplay (Billboard)	35

Chart (2018)	Peak position
Japan Hot 100 (Billboard)	88
US Hot Rock & Alternative Songs (Billboard) Live Aid version	23

=== Year-end charts ===
Chart (2019)	Position
US Hot Rock Songs (Billboard) Live Aid version	73

== Certifications ==
Region	Certification	Certified units/sales
Brazil (Pro-Música Brasil)	Gold	30,000^{‡}
New Zealand (RMNZ)	Gold	15,000^{‡}
United Kingdom (BPI)	Gold	400,000^{‡}
^{‡} Sales+streaming figures based on certification alone.
