= Red Special (album) =

EP by Brian May
- Released: October 28, 1998 (Japan)
- Recorded: 1998
- Genre: Rock
- Length: 38:11
- Label: EMI
- Producer: Brian May

Brian May chronology
Another World (1998)	Red Special (1998)	Furia (2000)

Red Special is an EP by guitarist Brian May of Queen. The mini-album was a Japan-only release to promote the tour in Japan.

== Overview ==
The EP contains exclusive live tracks by The Brian May Band recorded at the European part of his Another World tour, tracks taken from the Another World album and singles' B-sides.

== Track listing ==
1. "On My Way Up" (Live in Paris, June 98) (Brian May) – 8:05
2. "Why Don't We Try Again" (May) – 5:23
3. "Maybe Baby" (Buddy Holly, Norman Petty) – 2:11
4. "Business (USA Radio Mix Uncut)" (May) – 5:10
5. "Another World" (May) – 4:07
6. "Only Make Believe" (Conway Twitty, Jack Nance) – 2:38
7. "Hammer to Fall" (Live in Paris, June 98) (May) – 9:08
8. "Brian Talks (A Tribute to Cozy Powell)" – 1:13

== Personnel ==
- Brian May - vocals, guitars, bass guitar, keyboards, programming
- Cozy Powell - drums, percussion
- Steve Ferrone - drums, percussion
- Ken Taylor - bass guitar
- Neil Murray - bass guitar
- Jamie Moses - guitar
- Spike Edney - keyboards

=== Personnel on live tracks ===
- Spike Edney - keyboards
- Jamie Moses - guitar
- Steve Ferrone - drums, cocktail kit
- Neil Murray - bass guitar
- Susie Webb and Zoe Nicholas - backing vocals

== Production ==
- Arrangement and production - Brian May
- Engineering and co-production - Justin Shirley-Smith
- Additional mixing (live tracks) - David Richards and Neil Amor
- Design - Richard Gray
- Equipment supervision and maintenance - Peter Malandrone
- Mastered by Kevin Metcalfe at The Soundmasters
