= The Brian May Band =

English rock band

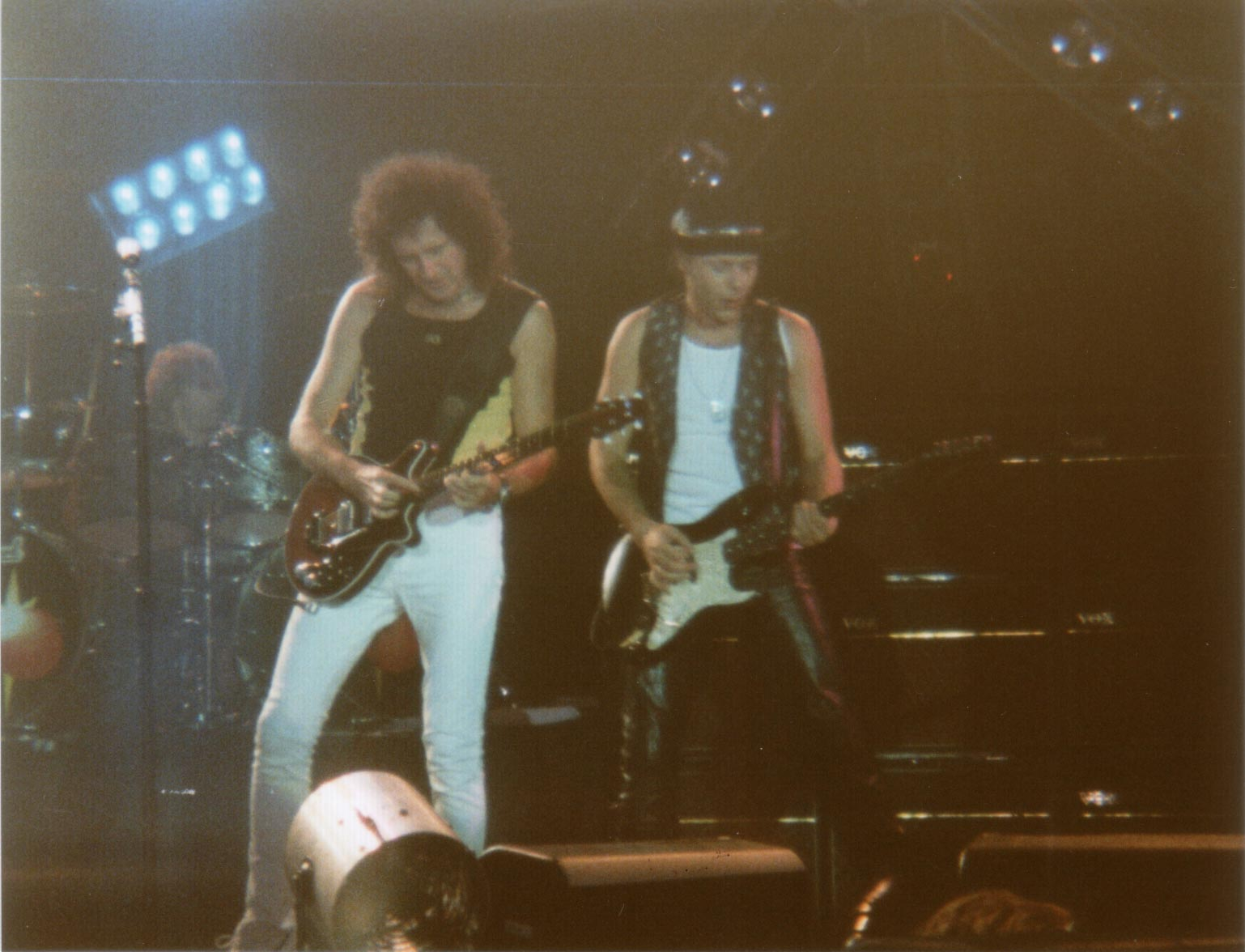
- The band performing in 1998

Background information
- Origin: London, England
- Genres: Rock
- Years active: 1991–1993, 1998
- Past members: Brian May; Cozy Powell; Neil Murray; Spike Edney; Jamie Moses; Cathy Porter; Shelley Preston; Eric Singer; Michael Casswell; Miriam Stockley; Maggie Ryder

The Brian May Band were an English rock band formed by Queen guitarist Brian May for touring in promotion of his studio albums.

== History ==
The rhythm section for the band were Cozy Powell and Neil Murray, who had previously worked together in Black Sabbath and Whitesnake. Spike Edney, who was the tour keyboardist for Queen between 1984 and 1986 took the keyboard spot.

The band was originally formed in October 1991 for May's performance at Guitar Legends guitar festival in Seville, Spain. The band soon went on a tour of the United States, Europe and Japan. The tour ended in December 1993, when May returned to the studio with fellow Queen bandmates Roger Taylor and John Deacon for Queen's final studio album, Made In Heaven. Meanwhile, Cozy Powell and Neil Murray returned to work with Black Sabbath, and both later joined Peter Green's Band.

The band reunited in 1998 to promote Brian May's Another World album. Eric Singer, of later Kiss fame, was brought as the last minute replacement for Cozy Powell, who had died in a car accident earlier that year.

In 2005, both Jamie Moses and Spike Edney joined the Queen + Paul Rodgers collaboration on their worldwide tour.

The band's only release was the live album, Live at the Brixton Academy in 1993. Several live tracks were also released on "Resurrection" single and Red Special mini-album.

After the band's tours in 1993 and 1998, members went on to contribute to various projects. Most notably, Moses, Edney, Murray and Powell formed the original line up of the SAS (Spike's All Stars) Band, a band which was also joined by Susie Webb and Zoe Nicholas on later tours, and which Edney and Moses still perform with.

== Discography ==
- Live at the Brixton Academy (1994)

== Touring Band ==
Members for the 1992 South American Tour:

- Drums: Cozy Powell
- Guitar: Mike Caswell
- Keyboards, backing vocals: Spike Edney
- Bass: Neil Murray
- Backing Vocalists: Maggie Ryder, Miriam Stockley and Chris Thompson

Members for the 1993 'Back To The Light' World Tour:

- Drums: Cozy Powell
- Guitar, backing vocals: Jamie Moses
- Keyboards, backing vocals: Spike Edney
- Bass: Neil Murray
- Backing Vocalists: Catherine Porter and Shelley Preston

Members for the 1998 'Another World' World Tour:

- Drums: Eric Singer
- Guitar, backing vocals: Jamie Moses
- Keyboards, backing vocals: Spike Edney
- Bass: Neil Murray
- Backing Vocals: Susie Webb and Zoe Nicholas
