= Broken English (band) =

British rock band

- Origin: United Kingdom
- Genres: Rock
- Years active: 1987 – 1991
- Label: EMI
- Past members: Steve Elson; Alan Coates; Jamie Moses; Paul Fenton; Geoff Cooper

Broken English were a British rock band formed in 1987 by Steve Elson (singer and guitarist), who at the time performed in a Rolling Stones tribute band.

== History ==
The group started after Elson wrote a song called "Comin' On Strong", which a friend of his Oliver Smallman, heard the song and thought it was too good to be a one-off novelty song and encouraged Elson to put together a band and record more material. The first single did reasonably well; however, the two follow-up singles did not fare so well. This is highlighted and detailed in the sleeve notes of their only album which was released in 2007, several years after the band stopped performing.

Broken English were one of the opening acts on the ITV programme The Roxy, which was set up as opposition to BBC Television's Top of the Pops.

== Music videos ==
Comin on Strong features a full-length music video of the band in their Ghostbusters look, playing the song in a run down work yard. Due to the visible steam of their breath, the video gives the impression that the band is in the cold outdoors.

Love on the Side Has a desert/cowboy theme with the band performing with their guitars. The closing shot shows the band departing up hill into the sunset, where they cross paths with three others dressed in the bands Ghostbusters uniforms.

Do You Really Want Me Back shows the band playing in a studio and is filmed in black and white. The video consists of a woman de icing a window allowing her to observe the band performing. At the end of the video the band appears in the style of the Take On Me video by A-ha.

== Band members ==
- Steve Elson - guitars, vocals (now lead singer 'Nick Dagger' of The Counterfeit Stones
- Jamie Moses - guitars (has performed with Queen + Paul Rodgers, Brian May, Tom Jones and Paul Young)
- Alan Coates - guitars (used to perform with The Hollies)
- Paul Fenton - drums (used to perform with T.Rex)
- Geoff Cooper - drums (used to perform with The Counterfeit Stones)

== Discography ==
=== Albums ===
Broken English recorded one album (called Platinum), which was not released until 2007, nearly 20 years after it was first recorded. The album's sleeve notes give a detailed history of the band and reasons for them slipping into obscurity.

- The Rough with the Smooth (2007)

Track listing

1. "Show a Little Mercy"
2. "Straight Lace Girls"
3. "Don't Change"
4. "Emotional Suicide"
5. "You Take Me Away"
6. "Comin' On Strong"
7. "Casanova"
8. "Ball 'n' Chain"
9. "Love on the Side"
10. "Woman of Stone"
11. "Do You Really Want Me Back"

Bonus tracks

1. "Comin' On Strong (2)"
2. "Fire Me Up"
3. "Rough Cut Diamonds"
4. "Running Out"

=== Singles ===
Song title	B-side	UK Singles Chart	CD	Picture disc	12"	7"	Information	Music Video
"Comin' On Strong"	"Suffer in Silence"	No. 18	YES	YES	YES	YES	Originally released as a white label to add to the mystery.	YES
"Love on the Side"	"Deep in My Heart"	No. 69		YES	YES	YES	According to the sleeve notes included with the album The Rough and the Smooth, it was suggested that Bruno Brookes' brother wrote a track for the band, which was included on the B-side of "Love on the Side". When word got around this had happened, and as Bruno Brookes was a DJ at Radio 1 at the time, the recording disappeared from the playlist.	YES
"Do You Really Want Me Back"; Waterfront Mix	"Do You Really Want Me Back"; 7" Version & "Running Out"	–	YES			YES		YES

== Popular culture ==
The band's only hit "Comin' On Strong", appears in the video game Grand Theft Auto V The song appears on the in-game radio station "Los Santos Rock Radio" and is used as brief cutscene soundtrack for the closing "heist complete" screen in multiplayer for the first heist "The Fleeca Job" playing in a bar while the two customizable player characters drink beer.
