= Catherine Porter =

American singer (born 1965)

- Genres: Pop; rock
- Instruments: Vocals; guitar; keyboards; violin
- Years active: 1992–present
- Website: http://myspace.com/catherineporter

Catherine Porter (born 1965) is an American singer, songwriter, and musician. She is a former member of The Brian May Band and has appeared in several musicals and films. To date, Porter has released one album of solo material, Something Good, in 2002, and has also worked as a back-up singer for Queen, Tony Hadley, Edwin Starr, Kiki Dee, Paul Rodgers, Sam Moore, Mel B and Chaka Khan.

== Early career ==
Her first big job was touring with Michael Crawford in The Music of Andrew Lloyd Webber, before being asked by Brian May, to join his backing band on an American tour supporting Guns N' Roses. She later retained the role on the UK leg of the tour, and appeared on both the 1993 live album Live at the Brixton Academy and his later 1998 solo record Another World. Porter also sang backing vocals on the 1995 Queen track "Let Me Live".

Her work with May brought Porter to London, which became her home for the following decade. She appeared in the West End in such plays as Only the Lonely, Sunset Boulevard (opposite John Barrowman and later Hugh Jackman), Saucy Jack and the Space Vixens and Ben Elton's Tonight's the Night.

== Jingles ==
Since 1996, Porter has been working with AJ Music Productions in New York, as a jingle singer, providing vocals for many radio packages, including Heart 106.2 FM London (2003), Capital Gold, Whitechapel AM, BBC Radio 2: for 'Steve Wright's Saturday Show' (1996–99), 'Ken Bruce', 'Steve Wright's Sunday Love Songs' (1996–present), 'Jonathan Ross on Saturday' (1999), 'Steve Wright in the Afternoon' (1999-2022). Porter continues to work with AJ to make personal cuts of these jingles for collectors around the world. Her vocals also feature on production music published by AJ's sister company, Music Candy.

== Recent career ==
In 2000, she attempted to become the United Kingdom's entry into the Eurovision Song Contest, with two songs shortlisted. Her composition "The Answer" was eliminated in a radio semi-final, but "Crazy" was selected for the TV heats. She failed to win the bid, losing out to Nicki French, who went on to finish 16th at the Eurovision final.

Throughout this period, Porter wrote songs having landed a deal with Jive Records. However, after the release of one single and album, Porter parted ways with Jive. After relocating back to New York, getting married and becoming a mother, she recorded an album of standards with James Pearson, released as Gems for Ruby on the Swing Cafe label. One of the tracks is a cover of Queen's "Somebody to Love", featuring Brian May, which was released as a single.

On December 13, 2010, she joined the cast of the Broadway production of Next to Normal as the stand-in for the role of Diana.

== Other work ==
Porter has also made brief excursions into films, making cameo appearances in Die Another Day and Batman Begins. She also performed the title song for the BBC television sitcom All About Me.

In 2001, she appeared on stage with comedian Rich Hall, singing three tracks with his character Otis Lee Crenshaw - a performance released on DVD, VHS and audio CD.

== Discography ==
Albums

- 2002: Something Good
- 2009: Gems for Ruby

Singles

- 2002: "She's So Cool"
- 2009: "Somebody to Love" (Queen cover), featuring Brian May
- 2011: Journeyman

The Brian May Band

- 1993: Live At The Brixton Academy album and VHS
- 1998: Another World, backing vocals on On My Way Up

Guest Appearances

- 1994: Roger Taylor, Happiness? - backing vocals on Old Friends
- 1995: Queen, Made in Heaven - backing vocals on Let Me Live
- 2001: Otis Lee Crenshaw & The Black Liars, London not Tennessee - duet vocals on "Trailerland" and "Conjugal Visit"
