= Furia (album) =

Album by Brian May

Soundtrack album by Brian May
- Released: November 23, 2000
- Recorded: January–March 1999
- Studios: Allerton Hill and CTS Studios Wembley
- Length: 45:53
- Label: EMI
- Producer: Brian May

Brian May chronology
Red Special (1998)	Furia (2000)

La musique de Furia – Un film de Alexandre Aja is the original soundtrack of the 1999 film Furia, written and recorded by Brian May. It is May's third solo album and his first soundtrack album. It is predominantly instrumental, with the exception of the song "Dream of Thee", which features vocals by May.

== Track listing ==
1. "Furia Theme – Opening Titles" – 4:40
2. "First Glance (Solo Flute)" – 1:35
3. "Landscape" – 1:14
4. "Tango: 'Cuesta Abajo'" – 2:59
5. "The Meeting (Solo Guitar)" – 1:35
6. "First Kiss" – 2:03
7. "Storm" – 2:19
8. "Phone" – 1:07
9. "Pursuit" – 3:45
10. "Diner" – 1:18
11. "Apparition" – 1:36
12. "Arrest" – 1:28
13. "Father and Son" – 1:34
14. "Aaron" – 0:49
15. "Fire" – 0:55
16. "Gun (Solo Violin)" – 1:55
17. "Reggae: 'Bird in Hand'" – 3:30
18. "Killing" – 1:13
19. "Escape" – 1:50
20. "Go On" – 2:19
21. "Dream of Thee" – 4:36
22. "Alternative Gun" – 1:33 (bonus track)

== Personnel ==
- Brian May – writing, arrangement, production; vocals, guitars and keyboards programming.
- Justin Shirley-Smith – co-producing and engineering.
- Michael Reed – orchestrations (performed by The London Musicians Orchestra, conducted by Michael Reed)
- Phillipa Davies – solo flute
- Rolf Wilson – first violin
- Dave Lee – solo horn
- Emily May – 'apparition' vocal
- Dick Lewzey – engineer for orchestral recording
- Erik Jordan – assistant engineer
- Sylvia Addison – fixer
- Richard Ihnatowicz – copyist
- Kevin Metcalfe and Gordon Vicary – mastering at The Soundmasters, London
- Richard Gray – sleeve design (with Brian May), artwork
- Jerome Trebois – front cover illustration
- Alexandre Aja – director and producer of the film

"Tango: 'Cuesta Abajo'" written by Carlos Gardel, performed by Manuel Cedron.

"'Bird in Hand'" written by Lee Scratch Perry, performed by The Upsetters.

Liner notes: "Respect to Julio Cortázar, author of the novel Graffiti."
