= Live at the Brixton Academy (Brian May album) =

Live album by The Brian May Band
- Released: 7 February 1994
- Recorded: 15 June 1993
- Venue: Brixton Academy, London
- Genre: Hard rock
- Length: 76:51
- Label: Parlophone
- Producer: Brian May, Justin Shirley-Smith

The Brian May Band chronology
Back to the Light (1992)	Live at the Brixton Academy (1994)	Another World (1998)

Professional ratings
Review scores
Source	Rating
Allmusic	3/5 stars

Live at the Brixton Academy is a recording of The Brian May Band's first show in London on June 15, 1993. The album was released on CD, cassette, LP and VHS in 1994, and remains the group's only release as a collective.

== Overview ==
The album is an almost complete and unedited version of the concert. Their performance of John Lennon's "God (The Dream Is Over)" was not included on the album due to copyright issues. Keyboard player Spike Edney had to play a second solo (neither are on the CD, the first being on the video) after May had technical problems before playing "Last Horizon". Also, "Back to the Light", "Tie Your Mother Down", "Love Token", "Headlong", "Let Your Heart Rule Your Head", "Resurrection" (in particular, Cozy Powell's drum solo), "We Will Rock You" and "Hammer to Fall" are all slightly shortened on the CD, but appear in full on the 90-minute video of the same event. The spoken part after "Love Token" has been cut because it contained too many profanities.

The tracks "'39 / Let Your Heart Rule Your Head", "Last Horizon" and "We Will Rock You" from the performance were also released as b-sides on several versions of "Last Horizon" single.

== Track listing ==
All tracks by Brian May, except where noted

1. "Back to the Light"
2. "Driven by You"
3. "Tie Your Mother Down"
4. "Love Token"
5. "Headlong"
6. "Love of My Life" (Freddie Mercury)
7. "'39" / "Let Your Heart Rule Your Head"
8. "Too Much Love Will Kill You" (May, Frank Musker, Elizabeth Lamers)
9. "Since You've Been Gone" (Russ Ballard)
10. "Now I'm Here"
11. "Guitar Extravagance"
12. "Resurrection" (May, Cozy Powell, Jamie Page)
13. "Last Horizon"
14. "We Will Rock You"
15. "Hammer to Fall"

== Personnel ==
- Brian May: vocals, lead guitar
- Jamie Moses: rhythm guitar, vocals
- Spike Edney: Hammond organ, synthesizer, piano, vocals
- Neil Murray: bass
- Cozy Powell: drums
- Catherine Porter: vocals
- Shelley Preston: vocals, tambourine
