= Another World (Brian May album) =

Studio album by Brian May
- Released: 1 June 1998
- Recorded: 1996–1998
- Studio: Allerton Hill Studio
- Genre: Hard rock
- Length: 52:18
- Label: Parlophone
- Producer: Brian May

Brian May chronology
Live at the Brixton Academy (1994)	Another World (1998)	Red Special (1998)

Singles from Another World
- 1. "On My Way Up" Released: 1998; 2. "Business" Released: 1998; 3. "Why Don't We Try Again" Released: 1998; 4. "Another World" Released: 1998

Professional ratings
Review scores
Source	Rating
AllMusic	2.5/5 stars
Guitarist	4/5
MusicHound Rock	2.5/5 stars

Another World is the second solo album by Queen guitarist Brian May, released on 1 June 1998 by Parlophone Records in the UK, and on 15 September 1998 by Hollywood Records in the US. May dedicated it to his mother. The song "Business" was the theme song of the first season of the comedy-drama series Frank Stubbs Promotes, and the track "On My Way Up" was used for its second season.

== Overview ==
Recorded at his home studio after the completion of the last Queen album, Made in Heaven, the album was released in the UK on 1 June 1998 and on 15 September of that year in the US.

The album itself started as a cover album. The "Heroes" concept was to record May's favourite tracks from his favourite artists, but the idea soon mutated into a full album. Some of the covers found their place on the album, whilst others were released as B-sides, on the Retro Rock Special EP, as Japanese bonus tracks and on the Red Special tour promo CD.

As part of promotion for the album and tour, May appeared as himself in the final episode of the BBC comedy sketch show Smith and Jones in October 1998.

Drummer Cozy Powell, with whom May worked on the album, died in a car accident before the album was finished. The song "Business" was released as a single, as a tribute to Cozy.

Guitarist Jeff Beck played on the track "The Guv'nor."

=== Reissue ===
In February 2022, May announced that the album would be reissued as part of the ongoing Brian May Gold Series, packaged with a second disc of bonus tracks titled Another Disc. The reissue was released on 22 April.

== Track listing ==
All tracks are written by Brian May, except where noted.

No.	Title	Writer(s)	Length
1.	"Space"		0:47
2.	"Business"		5:07
3.	"China Belle"		4:01
4.	"Why Don't We Try Again"		5:24
5.	"On My Way Up"		2:57
6.	"Cyborg"		3:54
7.	"The Guv'nor"		4:13
8.	"Wilderness"		4:52
9.	"Slow Down"	Larry Williams	4:18
10.	"One Rainy Wish"	Jimi Hendrix	4:05
11.	"All the Way from Memphis"	Ian Hunter	5:16
12.	"Another World" (includes hidden track "Being on My Own"; this is not found on the Japanese edition)		7:30

Bonus tracks on the Japanese edition
No.	Title	Writer(s)	Length
13.	"F.B.I"	Hank Marvin	3:11
14.	"Hot Patootie"	Richard O'Brien	3:20

2022 reissue Another Disc bonus disc
No.	Title	Writer(s)	Length
1.	"Brian Talks"		1:15
2.	"Business" (Rock on Cozy Mix)		4:41
3.	"Hot Patootie"	O'Brien	3:22
4.	"F.B.I." (original rough mix with real bass and drums)	Marvin	3:19
5.	"Maybe Baby"	Buddy Holly, Norman Petty	2:13
6.	"Only Make Believe"	Conway Twitty, Jack Nance	2:39
7.	"Otro Lugar" ("Another World" sung in Spanish)		4:07
8.	"Cyborg" (solo instrumental version)		3:30
9.	"Business Stings"		2:15
10.	"I'll Be Prayin'"		1:09
11.	"On My Way Up" (guitar version)		1:24
12.	"The Last Great Optimist"		0:54
13.	"On My Way Up" (live in Paris, June '98)		8:05
14.	"Hammer to Fall" (live in Paris, June '98)		9:11
15.	"My Boy"		2:07

== Personnel ==
- Brian May – vocals, guitars, keyboards, bass guitar, programming
- Cozy Powell – drums on "Business", "China Belle", "The Guv'nor", "Slow Down", "One Rainy Wish", and "All The Way From Memphis", drums and percussion on "Why Don't We Try Again?"
- Steve Ferrone – drums on "Another World"
- Neil Murray – bass guitar on "China Belle", "Slow Down", "One Rainy Wish", and "All The Way From Memphis"
- Ken Taylor – bass guitar on "Another World"
- Jamie Moses – guitar on "Slow Down"
- Spike Edney – keyboards on "Slow Down"
- London Metropolitan Orchestra – strings on "One Rainy Wish", conducted by Michael Kamen
- Cathy Porter – backing vocals on "On My Way Up"
- Shelley Preston – backing vocals on "On My Way Up" and "All the Way from Memphis"
- Nikki Love – backing vocals on "All the Way from Memphis"
- Becci Glover – backing vocals on "All the Way from Memphis"
- Taylor Hawkins – drums on "Cyborg"
- Jeff Beck – guitar on "The Guv'nor"
- Ian Hunter – guest raconteur on "All the Way from Memphis"

=== Production ===
- Arrangement and production by Brian May
- Engineering and co-production by Justin Shirley-Smith
- Recorded at the Allerton Hill Studio
- Mastered by Kevin Metcalfe at Townhouse Studios
- Design and photography – Richard Gray
- Equipment supervision, maintenance, stuff – Pete Malandrone

== Charts ==
1998 weekly chart performance for Another World
Chart (1998)	Peak position
Australian Albums (ARIA)	165
Austrian Albums (Ö3 Austria)	48
Dutch Albums (Album Top 100)	47
German Albums (Offizielle Top 100)	32
UK Albums (Official Charts)	23

2022 weekly chart performance for Another World
Chart (2022)	Peak position
Austrian Albums (Ö3 Austria)	47
Belgian Albums (Ultratop Wallonia)	95
German Albums (Offizielle Top 100)	15
Japanese Albums (Oricon)	35
Scottish Albums (Official Charts)	6
Spanish Albums (Promusicae)	39
Swiss Albums (Schweizer Hitparade)	31
UK Albums (Official Charts)	14
