= Jamie Moses =

English singer and guitarist (born 1955)

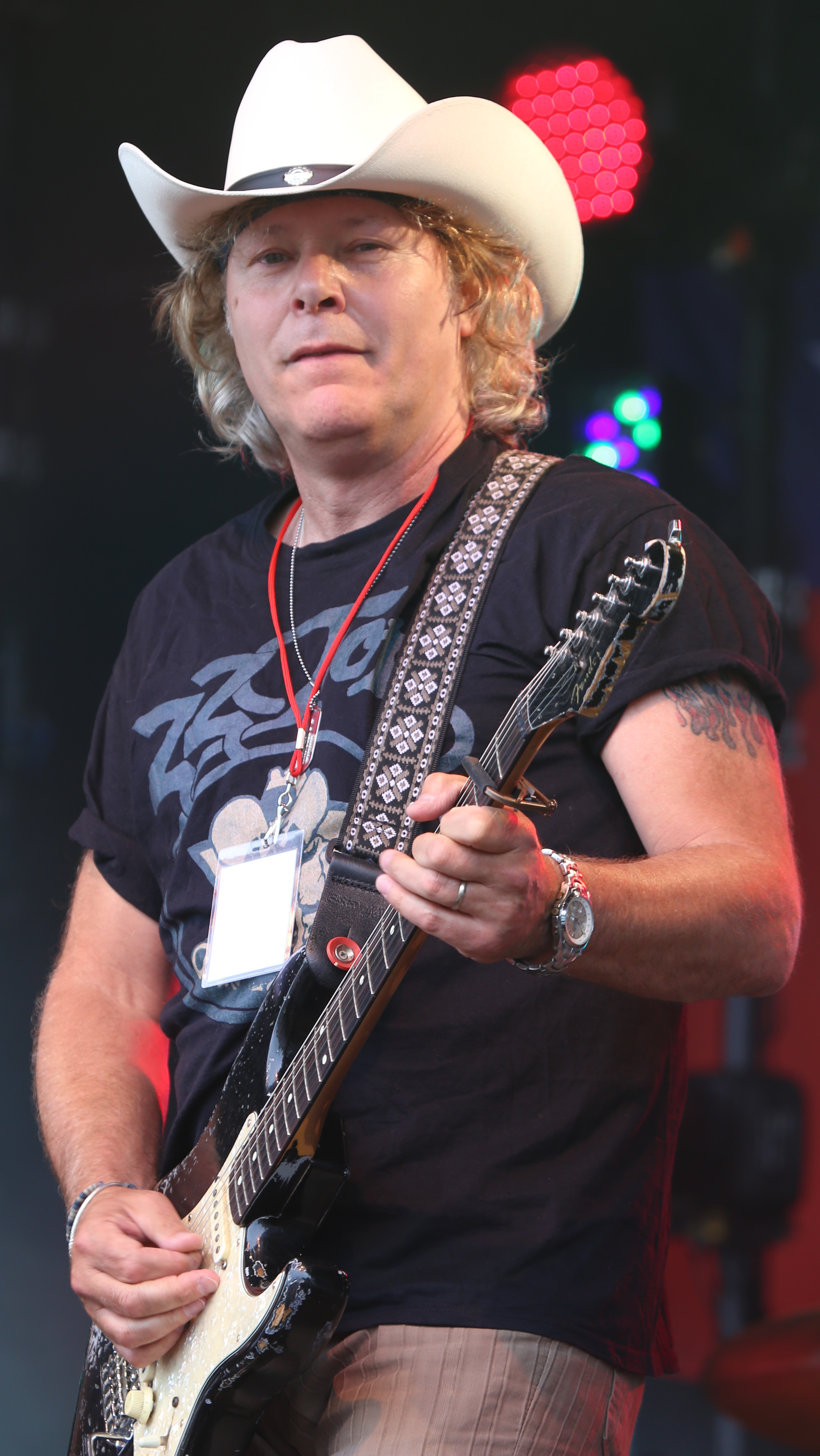
- Moses performing with Los Pacaminos in 2014

Background information
- Born: 30 August 1955 (age 70); Ipswich, Suffolk, England
- Genres: Rock, pop
- Occupation: Musician
- Instruments: Guitar; vocals
- Years active: 1973–present
- Member of: Los Pacaminos
- Formerly of: Broken English, The Brian May Band, Queen + Paul Rodgers, Mike & The Mechanics
- Website: jamiemoses.com

Jamie Moses (born 30 August 1955) is an English rock and pop singer and guitarist. He was formerly a member of The Brian May Band, Queen + Paul Rodgers, Mike & the Mechanics and Broken English.

== Biography ==
=== Biography ===
Moses was born in the Suffolk county town of Ipswich. His mother was English, while his father was an American member of the U.S. Air Force. He grew up in various parts of the United States and Japan, according to the change of location in his father's postings.

=== Career ===
A self-taught guitarist, he has been playing since the age of ten and began his professional work by performing material from artists such as Jimi Hendrix, James Brown, The Beatles and Sly and the Family Stone. He was playing on Air Force bases and on radio and TV by the age of 13. When his father retired from the Air Force, the family returned to England, where he has been a freelance musician ever since.

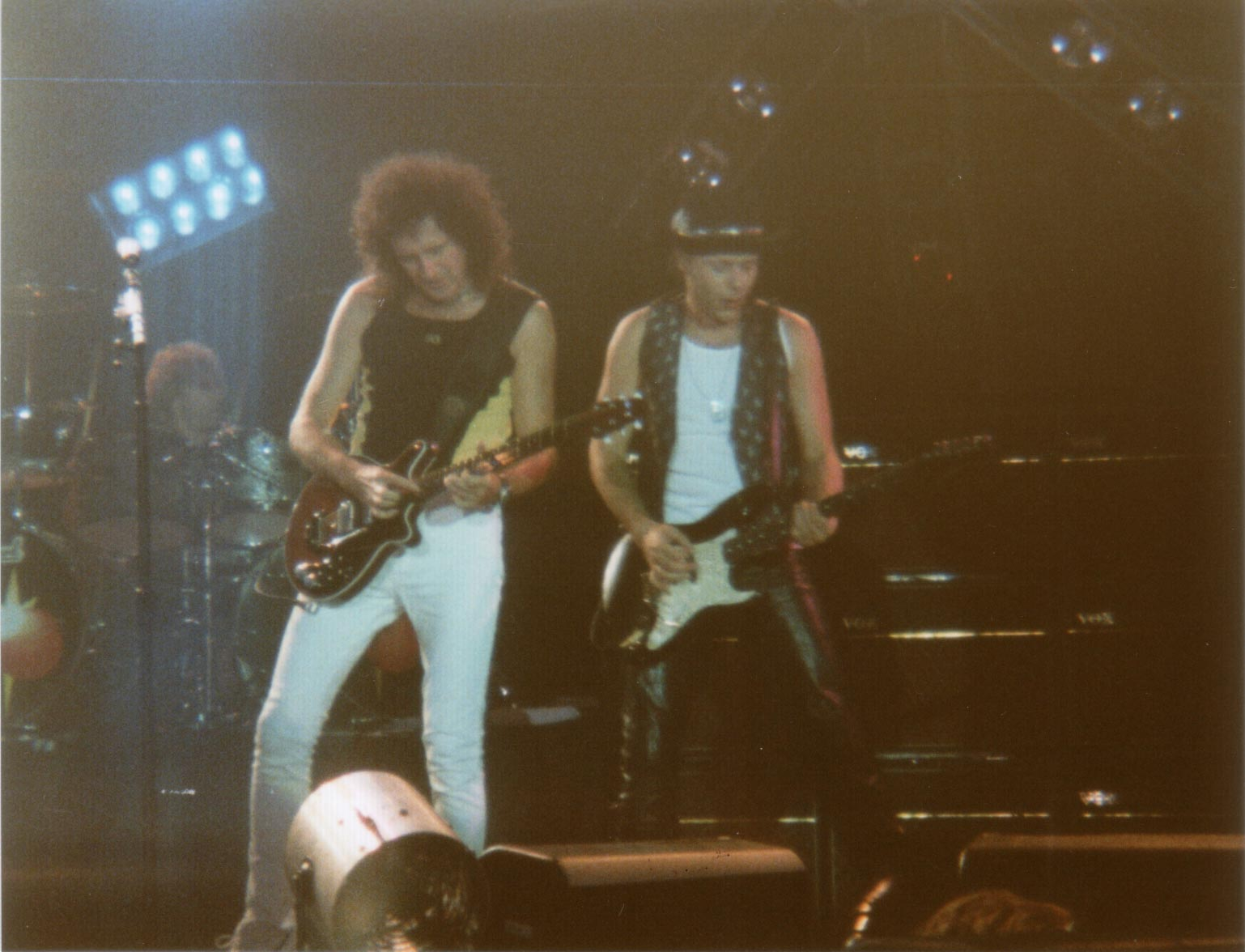
Moses (right) performing with The Brian May Band in 1998

He co-founded the Tex-Mex band Los Pacaminos in 1993, led by Paul Young and has been second guitarist for Brian May and Queen since 1992.

Between 2005 and 2008, he was second guitarist and backing vocalist for Queen + Paul Rodgers. He is a member of The SAS Band with Spike Edney, Hiding In Public, and the party band Jamie & the Falcons (fka The World Famous Red Sox) and also toured for many years with Tom Jones, Mike + The Mechanics, Eric Burdon, Bob Geldof, Broken English, Paul Young

=== Personal life ===
Moses has one daughter (Katy Anne, b. 1981) and two sons (Benjamin James, b. 1989 and Charles Jackson James (Charlie), b. 2010) and is married to Sarah Louise Moses (née Benton).

== Selected discography ==
- Merlin: Merlin (album 1974)
- Eric Burdon: I Used to Be an Animal (album 1988)
- Judy Cheeks: No Outsiders (album 1988)
- Bob Geldof: The Happy Club (album 1993)
- SAS Band: SAS Band (album 1994)
- Paul Young: Acoustic Paul Young (EP CD 1994)
- The Brian May Band: Live at the Brixton Academy (album/video, 1994)
- Paul Young: Paul Young (album 1997)
- Tony Hadley: Tony Hadley (album 1997)
- Roger Chapman: A Turn Unstoned? (album 1998)
- Brian May: Another World (solo guitar on "Slow Down") (album 1998)
- Mike + The Mechanics: Mike & the Mechanics Live (album 1999)
- SAS Band: The Show (album 2000)
- Robbie McIntosh: Wide Screen (album 2001)
- Los Pacaminos: Los Pacaminos (album 2002)
- Various Artists: Nelson Mandela 46664 Concert, Amandla (album 2002)
- Rock Kids: Kids Will Rock You (album 2003)
- Drew Barfield: Deep Water Terminal (album 2004)
- Hiding in Public: Silent Exchange (album 2005)
- Queen + Paul Rodgers: Return of the Champions (CD/DVD, 2005)
- Queen + Paul Rodgers: Super Live in Japan (DVD, 2006, Japan only)
- Los Pacaminos: Los Pacaminos Live (album 2006)
- Hiding in Public: What Lies Ahead (album 2007)
- Broken English: The Rough With the Smooth (album 2007)
- Samantha Horwill: Figure of 3 (album 2007)
- Queen + Paul Rodgers: Live in Ukraine (DVD 2009)
- Hiding in Public: Worlds Away, Yards Apart (album 2009)
- Melissa Israel: Ghost of a Girl (album 2009)
- Charlotte Gordon Cumming: The Brave Songs (album 2010)
- Mike & the Mechanics: The Road (album 2011)
- Hiding In Public: Inner Anarchist (album 2012)
- Band of Sisters: Issues (album 2013)
- Zididada: Fix Your Heart (album 2013)
- Los Pacaminos: A Fistful of Statins (album 2014)
- Chery Baker: Cheryl Sings Joni (album 2014)
- Right Said Fred Exactly (album 2017)
- Los Pacaminos: Viva! (live album 2018)
- Los Pacaminos: Seven (album 2023)
