= Super Live in Japan =

Video by Queen + Paul Rodgers
- Released: April 28, 2006 (Japan only)
- Genre: Rock
- Label: EMI Music Japan
- Producer: Simon Lupton

Queen + Paul Rodgers chronology
Return of the Champions (2005)	Super Live in Japan (2006)	Live in Ukraine (2009)

Super Live in Japan is a DVD by Queen + Paul Rodgers, capturing the performances in Saitama Super Arena in Japan on 27 October 2005 from their world tour, featuring songs from both Queen and Rodgers' catalogues. 15 of these songs became available on DVD to the rest of the world as a Bonus DVD for the Queen + Paul Rodgers studio album The Cosmos Rocks (2008). The songs are marked as such: *. "Fire and Water" was released on the digital single for "C-lebrity", and "Fire and Water" and "The Show Must Go On" will be available to download on the "C-lebrity" iTunes exclusive single.

== Disc one ==
Lead vocals by Paul Rodgers, except where noted.

1. "Reaching Out" *
2. "Tie Your Mother Down" *
3. "Fat Bottomed Girls" *
4. "Another One Bites the Dust" *
5. "Fire and Water" *
6. "Crazy Little Thing Called Love"*
7. "Say It's Not True" * Lead vocals: Roger Taylor
8. "'39" * Lead vocals: Brian May
9. "Love of My Life" * Lead vocals: Brian May
10. "Teo Torriatte (Let Us Cling Together)" ** Lead vocals: Brian May and Paul Rodgers
11. "Hammer to Fall"
12. "Feel Like Makin' Love"
13. "Let There Be Drums"
14. "I'm in Love with My Car" * Lead vocals: Roger Taylor
15. "Guitar Solo"
16. "Last Horizon"
17. "These Are the Days of Our Lives" ** Lead vocals: Roger Taylor
18. "Radio Ga Ga" ** Lead vocals: Roger Taylor and Paul Rodgers
19. "Can't Get Enough" *
20. "A Kind of Magic"
21. "Wishing Well"
22. "I Want It All"
23. "Bohemian Rhapsody" * Lead vocals: Freddie Mercury (pre-recorded) and Paul Rodgers
24. "I Was Born to Love You" ** Lead vocals: Brian May and Roger Taylor
25. "The Show Must Go On"
26. "All Right Now" *
27. "We Will Rock You" *
28. "We Are the Champions" *
29. "God Save the Queen" (tape) *

DVD produced by Simon Lupton.
Audio for DVD produced by Justin Shirley-Smith & Kris Fredriksson.
Mixed by Joshua J Macrae

== Disc two ==
The Second Disc contains a Queen + Paul Rodgers documentary shot in Budapest.
