= Rock the Cosmos Tour =

2008 concert tour by Queen and Paul Rodgers

- World tour by Queen + Paul Rodgers
- Poster with the tour dates
- Location: Europe; Middle East; South America
- Associated album: The Cosmos Rocks
- Start date: 12 September 2008
- End date: 29 November 2008
- Legs: 3
- No. of shows: 34 in Europe; 1 in the Middle East; 5 in South America; 40 in total

Queen concert chronology
- Queen + Paul Rodgers Tour (2005–2006); Rock the Cosmos Tour (2008); Queen + Adam Lambert Tour 2012 (2012)

The Rock the Cosmos Tour was the second and final concert tour by Queen + Paul Rodgers, promoting their only studio album The Cosmos Rocks. The opening date was recorded for a DVD release. which was released on 15 June 2009. The tour included one of the largest open-air concerts in Kharkiv, Ukraine which garnered 350,000 people. Over the course of the tour, they played to just short of one million viewers.

== Set list ==
This set list is representative of the performance on 13 October 2008 in London. It does not represent all concerts for the duration of the tour.

1. "Hammer to Fall"
2. "Tie Your Mother Down"
3. "Fat Bottomed Girls"
4. "Another One Bites the Dust"
5. "I Want It All"
6. "I Want to Break Free"
7. "C-lebrity"
8. "Surfs Up... School's Out"
9. "Seagull"
10. "Love of My Life"
11. "'39"
12. "Bass solo" / "Drum solo"
13. "I'm in Love with My Car"
14. "A Kind of Magic"
15. "Say It's Not True"
16. "Bad Company"
17. "We Believe"
18. "Guitar Solo" / "Bijou" / "Last Horizon"
19. "Radio Ga Ga"
20. "Crazy Little Thing Called Love"
21. "The Show Must Go On"
22. "Bohemian Rhapsody"
  Encore
23. "Cosmos Rockin'"
24. "All Right Now"
25. "We Will Rock You"
26. "We Are the Champions"

== Tour dates ==
Date	City	Country	Venue
Europe
12 September 2008	Kharkiv	Ukraine	Freedom Square
15 September 2008	Moscow	Russia	Olimpiyskiy
16 September 2008	Moscow	Russia	Olimpiyskiy
19 September 2008	Riga	Latvia	Arena Riga
21 September 2008	Berlin	Germany	Berlin Velodrome
23 September 2008	Antwerp	Belgium	Sportpaleis
24 September 2008	Paris	France	Palais Omnisports de Paris-Bercy
26 September 2008	Rome	Italy	Palalottomatica
28 September 2008	Milan	Italy	Datchforum
29 September 2008	Zürich	Switzerland	Hallenstadion
1 October 2008	Munich	Germany	Olympiahalle
2 October 2008	Mannheim	Germany	SAP Arena
4 October 2008	Hanover	Germany	TUI Arena
5 October 2008	Hamburg	Germany	Color Line Arena
7 October 2008	Rotterdam	Netherlands	Rotterdam Ahoy
8 October 2008	Esch-sur-Alzette	Luxembourg	Rockhal
10 October 2008	Nottingham	England	Nottingham Arena
11 October 2008	Glasgow	Scotland	Scottish Exhibition and Conference Centre
13 October 2008	London	England	The O_{2} Arena
14 October 2008	Cardiff	Wales	Cardiff International Arena
16 October 2008	Birmingham	England	National Indoor Arena
18 October 2008	Liverpool	England	Echo Arena Liverpool
19 October 2008	Sheffield	England	Sheffield Arena
22 October 2008	Barcelona	Spain	Palau Sant Jordi
24 October 2008	Murcia	Spain	Estadio de La Condomina
25 October 2008	Madrid	Spain	Palacio de Deportes de la Comunidad
28 October 2008	Budapest	Hungary	Papp László Budapest Sportaréna
29 October 2008	Belgrade	Serbia	Belgrade Arena
31 October 2008	Prague	Czech Republic	O_{2} Arena
1 November 2008	Vienna	Austria	Wiener Stadthalle
4 November 2008	Newcastle	England	Metro Radio Arena
5 November 2008	Manchester	England	Manchester Evening News Arena
7 November 2008	London	England	The O2 Arena
8 November 2008	London	England	Wembley Arena
Middle East
14 November 2008	Dubai	United Arab Emirates	Dubai Festival City
South America
19 November 2008	Santiago	Chile	Estadio San Carlos de Apoquindo
21 November 2008	Buenos Aires	Argentina	José Amalfitani Stadium
26 November 2008	São Paulo	Brazil	Via Funchal
27 November 2008	São Paulo	Brazil	Via Funchal
29 November 2008	Rio de Janeiro	Brazil	HSBC Arena

=== Box office score data ===
Venue	City	Tickets sold / available	Gross revenue
Sportspaleis	Antwerp	13,043 / 15,719 (83%)	$1,018,028
O2 Arena	London	18,687 / 18,687 (100%)	$1,294,847
Via Funchal	São Paulo	8,860 / 10,000 (89%)	$1,006,163
HSBC Arena	Rio de Janeiro	6,472 / 9,100 (71%)	$364,528
TOTAL		47,062 / 53,506 (88%)	$3,683,566

== Personnel ==
- Brian May – lead guitar, vocals
- Roger Taylor – drums, tambourine, vocals
- Paul Rodgers – lead vocals, guitar, piano, harmonica
- Freddie Mercury – pre-recorded lead vocals

=== Additional musicians ===
- Spike Edney – synthesizer, piano, keytar, accordion, backing vocals
- Danny Miranda – bass guitar, electric upright bass, backing vocals
- Jamie Moses – rhythm guitar, backing vocals, electric upright bass on "Bass Solo" (Cardiff & Birmingham gigs only)
- Neil Murray (replacing Danny Miranda in Cardiff & Birmingham) – bass guitar, electric upright bass on "'39"

=== Guests ===
- Al Murray was a guest at the first O2 gig and sang "Cosmos Rockin'" with Rodgers.
- Former Prime Minister of Latvia Ivars Godmanis was a guest in Riga playing the drums on "All Right Now", with Taylor on tambourine.
