= Queen + =

British-American musical collaborations (2004–)

Queen + is the name the band Queen has used for two separate projects since 2004. The first is Queen + Paul Rodgers, featuring Paul Rodgers from Free and Bad Company and the second is Queen + Adam Lambert, featuring American Idol runner-up Adam Lambert, who scored a hit in 2009 with Whataya Want from Me. As with all Queen activity, and due to his retirement since 1997, John Deacon has not participated in the Queen + projects in any capacity. Only one studio album of original material has been released under the Queen + name, this being The Cosmos Rocks as Queen + Paul Rodgers, although the band has hinted at heading into the studio to record as Queen + Adam Lambert after initially being reluctant to do so due to the failure of The Cosmo Rocks album.

== Queen + Paul Rodgers ==
Queen + Paul Rodgers
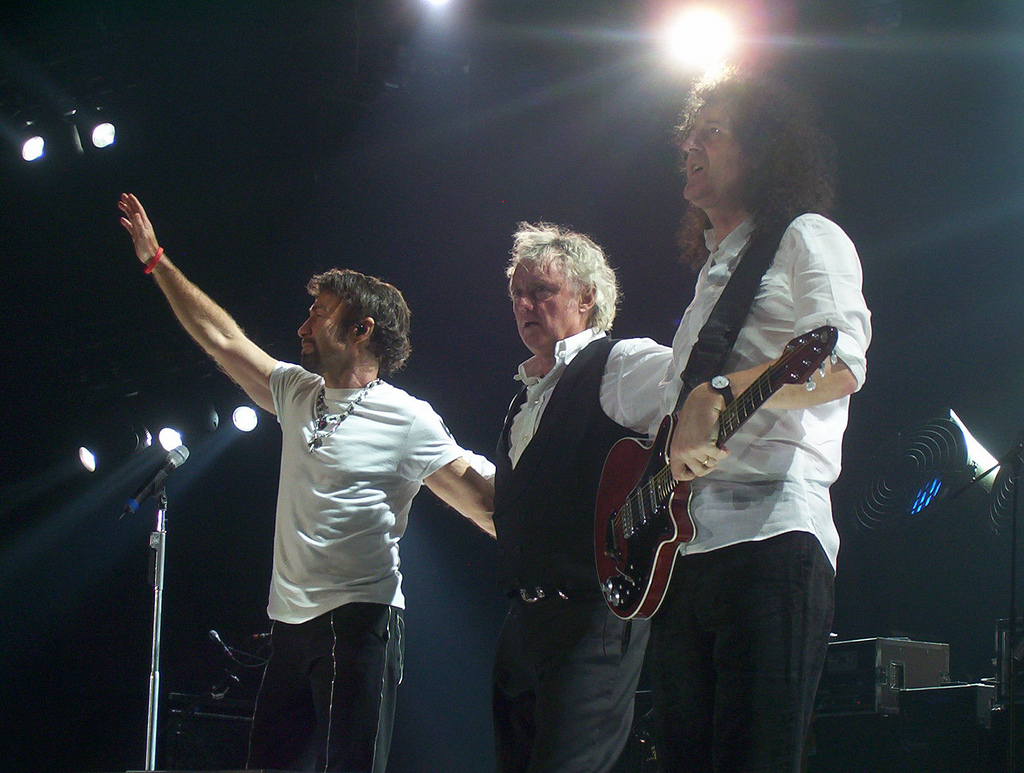
- L–R: Paul Rodgers, Roger Taylor and Brian May in 2005

Background information
- Origin: England
- Genre: Rock
- Years active: 2004–2009
- Labels: Hollywood; Parlophone
- Spinoff of: Queen
- Past members: Brian May; Roger Taylor; Paul Rodgers

Queen + Paul Rodgers is the first band under the Queen + banner. This band formed after Roger Taylor and Brian May joined Paul Rodgers for a performance of Free's All Right Now at the Fender Strat Pack in 2004. After realizing their potential chemistry, they invited Rodgers to join them, and embarked on their first tour, Return of the Champions, which lasted from 2005 until 2006.

Following this, the band went into the studio in 2006 and cut The Cosmos Rocks in 2008, however, the album was not a successful as prior Queen albums, and lead to the band's hesitation to record a studio album with Queen + Adam Lambert. Following the album's release, the band embarked on their second and final tour titled Rock the Cosmos throughout 2008.

In 2009, the band split up, however, Rodgers has hinted he would be open to working with Queen again in the future. In the years since their split, rumors have come and gone regarding possible reunions, but nothing came of these, especially after Paul Rodgers developed health issues in the 2010s.

== Queen + Adam Lambert ==
Queen + Adam Lambert
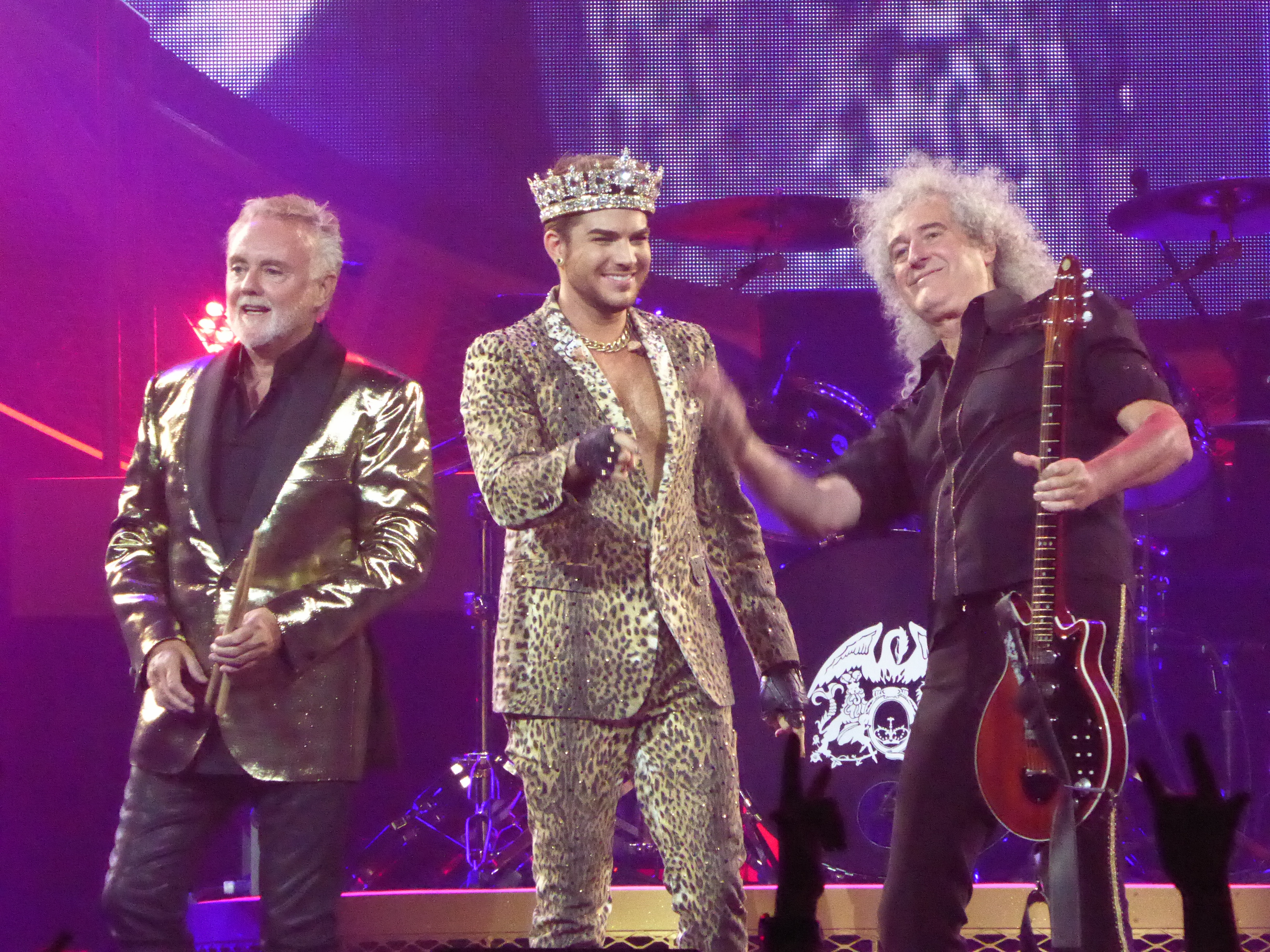
- Queen + Adam Lambert in July 2014, performing at SAP Center in San Jose, from left to right: Roger Taylor, Adam Lambert, Brian May

Background information
- Also known as: Q+AL; QAL
- Origin: United Kingdom; United States
- Genre: Rock
- Years active: 2011–present
- Labels: Virgin EMI; EMI; Hollywood
- Spinoff of: Queen
- Members: Brian May; Roger Taylor; Adam Lambert; Spike Edney; Neil Fairclough; Tyler Warren
- Past members: Rufus Tiger Taylor

Queen + Adam Lambert is the second band under the Queen + banner, featuring American Idol runner-up Adam Lambert, who up to that point, was known for his 2009 solo hit Whataya Want from Me. The band came to be after Brian May and Roger Taylor were guests on the eighth season of American Idol, of which Lambert was a part of. Lambert and eventual winner Kris Allen performed We Are the Champions together with the band. After this performance, May revealed he was considering Lambert as a replacement for Paul Rodgers after watching his American Idol audition, where he performed Bohemian Rhapsody.

In November 2011, Adam Lambert joined Queen for a performance at the MTV Europe Awards in Belfast, where Queen received a Global Icon award. It was then subsequently reported in December 2011 that May and Taylor were in discussions with Lambert to tour with them.

On June 30, 2012, Queen + Adam Lambert performed their first, full concert at Kyiv's Independence Square for a joint show with Elton John in aid of the Elena Pinchuk ANTIAIDS Foundation. Following this performance, the band embarked on many tours over the years, the most recent being The Rhapsody Tour in 2019.

Despite initially being reluctant to the idea due to the failure of The Cosmos Rocks album, May and Taylor have softened their stance on recording new, original material with Lambert, and have expressed an interest in heading into the studio to do so.
