= Queen + Paul Rodgers Tour =

2005–06 concert tour by Queen + Paul Rodgers

- World tour by Queen + Paul Rodgers
- Poster to the concert in Pesaro, Italy
- Location: Asia; Central America; Europe; North America
- Start date: March 28, 2005
- End date: April 13, 2006
- Legs: 5
- No. of shows: 32 in Europe; 1 in Central America; 25 in North America; 6 in Asia; 64 in total

Queen concert chronology
- The Freddie Mercury Tribute Concert (1992); Queen + Paul Rodgers Tour (2005–2006); Rock the Cosmos Tour (2008)

The Queen + Paul Rodgers Tour (also known as Return of the Champions Tour) was the first world concert tour by Queen guitarist Brian May and drummer Roger Taylor, joined by singer Paul Rodgers under the moniker of Queen + Paul Rodgers. The tour was Queen's first since The Magic Tour in 1986, and the death of lead singer Freddie Mercury in November 1991. The band's drummer Roger Taylor commented; "We never thought we would tour again, Paul (Rodgers) came along by chance and we seemed to have a chemistry. Paul is just such a great singer. He's not trying to be Freddie." Bassist John Deacon also did not take part due to his retirement in 1997.

== History ==
The origins of the collaboration came when Brian May played at the Fender Strat Pack concert in 2004. Now for the first time, he joined Paul Rodgers for a rendition of Free's classic, "All Right Now". After this Brian spoke of a chemistry between the two of them. Following this, Brian invited Paul to play with Queen at their induction to the UK Music Hall of Fame. Again citing a new excitement with Rodgers, the three announced they would tour in 2005. The tour originally was meant only to include Europe and the 46664 concerts of that year. However at the end of the European tour, some dates in the USA and Japan were added. In 2006, a full scale US tour was undertaken.

== The show ==
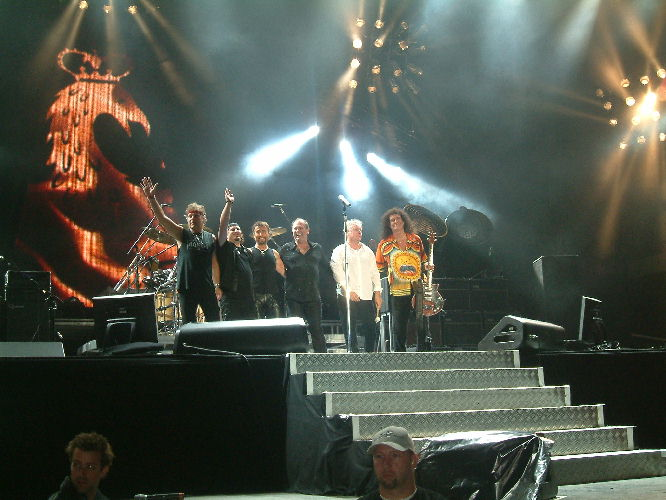
Queen + Paul Rodgers performing at Cologne on July 6, 2005 during their European Tour.

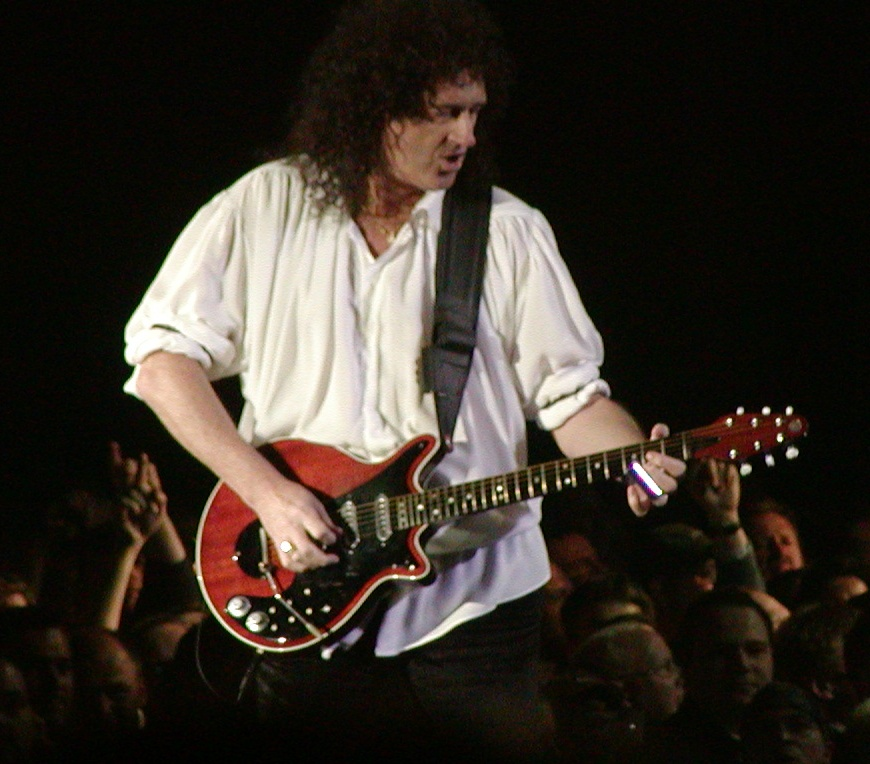
Brian May performing during the tour.

The stage design for the tour was created by Mark Fisher and was minimal, lacking a large backing screen that would later be featured on the Rock The Cosmos Tour, and elaborate stage theatrics. Four very large, custom-built moving spotlights sat behind the stage, each containing a 3000-watt xenon bulb and operated by a crewperson. A large 'B Stage' was constructed out from the main stage, into the audience which would frequently be used for acoustic performances by all the members of the band. The show began with the Eminem song "Lose Yourself" being played over the PA system, and a dance-theme remix of the Queen song It's A Beautiful Day. Toward the end of "Lose Yourself", the guitar would join in from behind a large curtain which covered the band from view, before Rodgers would appear singing a shortened version of the song "Reachin' Out". Thought by many fans to be a new song, it was a charity song that both Brian and Paul had played together on in the 1990s. Brian would appear after, playing the introductory riff to "Tie Your Mother Down", before the curtain fell and the band would perform the full song.

The first segment of the concert consisted largely of Queen hits and some of Rodgers' songs. To introduce "Fat Bottomed Girls", Brian would play the introductory riff from the earlier Queen song "White Man". Rodgers often played a muted steel string guitar on "Crazy Little Thing Called Love". An acoustic section would follow, Taylor leaving the kit at times to sing "Say It's Not True" on the B-Stage, while Brian would play acoustic Queen songs such as "Love of My Life" and "39". At the Hyde Park concert, John Lennon's song "Imagine" was added to the setlist, being played after "Love of My Life", in response to the recent bombings in London. A unique version of "Hammer To Fall" would be played, which featured a slower and mellower first verse sung by May and Rodgers. The second half of the song would be played as a full band, depending on the condition of his voice, Rodgers would also sing this section, or leave it to Taylor. Taylor would often play an intricate cover of Sandy Nelson drum instrumental "Let There Be Drums", followed by a performance of "I'm in Love with My Car", with Taylor taking lead vocals and the drum parts.

A guitar solo by May would follow, with a band instrumental of "Last Horizon" playing, in which a large mirror ball was used. During the second half of the concert, Taylor would leave the kit to sing "These Are The Days Of Our Lives", with a screen playing nostalgic footage, including shots of the band on their early tours in Japan. "Radio GaGa" would follow, with Taylor singing the first and second verses, with drum samples from the studio version controlled by Edney. Rodgers would take the rest of the song, with Taylor playing live drums for the rest of the song. During "Bohemian Rhapsody", Freddie's vocal and piano part, along with video footage from Queen's 1986 show at Wembley Stadium would be used, while the rest of the band would play live music. After the operatic section, Rodgers would sing the heavy part, while the closing lines of the song would be an interchanging duet between Rodgers and Mercury. The song would end with Mercury taking a bow to the crowd, and the band would leave the stage. For the encore, a largely rigid line up of "The Show Must Go On", "All Right Now", "We Will Rock You" and "We Are The Champions" would be played, before the band would leave the stage, Taylor throwing his drumsticks into the audience.

== Set list ==
This set list is representative of the performance on April 28, 2005 in Hamburg. It does not represent all concerts for the duration of the tour.

1. "Lose Yourself" (tape)
2. "Reaching Out"
3. "Tie Your Mother Down"
4. "I Want to Break Free"
5. "Fat Bottomed Girls"
6. "Wishing Well"
7. "Crazy Little Thing Called Love"
8. "Say It's Not True"
9. "'39"
10. "Love of My Life"
11. "Hammer to Fall"
12. "Feel Like Makin' Love"
13. "Let There Be Drums"
14. "I'm in Love with My Car"
15. "Guitar Solo"
16. "Last Horizon"
17. "These Are the Days of Our Lives"
18. "Radio Ga Ga"
19. "Can't Get Enough"
20. "A Kind of Magic"
21. "I Want It All"
22. "Bohemian Rhapsody"
23. "The Show Must Go On"
  Encore
24. "All Right Now"
25. "We Will Rock You"
26. "We Are the Champions"
27. "God Save the Queen" (tape)

== Tour dates ==
Date	City	Country	Venue	Support act(s)	Attendance	Box office
Europe
March 28, 2005	London	England	Brixton Academy	—	4,921 / 4,921	—
March 30, 2005	Paris	France	Zénith Paris	—	4,068 / 6,450	—
April 1, 2005	Madrid	Spain	Palacio de Deportes de la Comunidad	—	11,753 / 15,500	—
April 2, 2005	Barcelona	Spain	Palau Sant Jordi	—	13,032 / 18,000	—
April 4, 2005	Rome	Italy	PalaLottomatica	—	7,922 / 10,325	—
April 5, 2005	Milan	Italy	Mediolanum Forum	—	8,457 / 10,580	—
April 7, 2005	Florence	Italy	Nelson Mandela Forum	—	4,075 / 6,950	—
April 8, 2005	Pesaro	Italy	BPA Palas	—	8,561 / 13,000	—
April 10, 2005	Basel	Switzerland	St. Jakobshalle	—	4,998 / 8,340	—
April 13, 2005	Vienna	Austria	Wiener Stadthalle	—	9,211 / 15,212	—
April 14, 2005	Munich	Germany	Olympiahalle	—	12,671 / 14,250	—
April 16, 2005	Prague	Czech Republic	O_{2} Arena	—	12,863 / 18,000	—
April 17, 2005	Leipzig	Germany	Leipzig Arena	—	9,366 / 10,250	—
April 19, 2005	Frankfurt	Germany	Festhalle Frankfurt	—	8,892 / 13,500	—
April 20, 2005	Antwerp	Belgium	Sportpaleis	—	17,776 / 23,359	—
April 23, 2005	Budapest	Hungary	Budapest Sportaréna	—	6,917 / 12,500	—
April 25, 2005	Dortmund	Germany	Westfalenhallen	—	12,343 / 14,635	—
April 26, 2005	Rotterdam	Netherlands	Rotterdam Ahoy	—	—	—
April 28, 2005	Hamburg	Germany	Color Line Arena	—	—	—
April 30, 2005	Stockholm	Sweden	Globe Arena	—	—	—
May 3, 2005	Newcastle	England	Metro Radio Arena	—	—	—
May 4, 2005	Manchester	England	Manchester Evening News Arena	—	—	—
May 6, 2005	Birmingham	England	National Exhibition Centre	—	—	—
May 7, 2005	Cardiff	Wales	Cardiff International Arena	—	—	—
May 9, 2005	Sheffield	England	Hallam FM Arena	—	—	—
May 11, 2005	London	England	Wembley Pavilion	—	—	—
May 13, 2005	Belfast	Northern Ireland	Odyssey Arena	—	—	—
May 14, 2005	Dublin	Ireland	Point Theatre	—	—	—
July 2, 2005	Lisbon	Portugal	Estádio do Restelo	Hands on Approach; Fingertips	—	—
July 6, 2005	Cologne	Germany	RheinEnergieStadion	—	—	—
July 10, 2005 (Note: The July 10, 2005 concert at the GelreDome was originally scheduled for at Goffertpark in Nijmegen.)	Arnhem	Netherlands	GelreDome	Krezip	—	—
July 15, 2005 (Note: The July 15, 2005 concert at Hyde Park was originally scheduled for July 8, 2005.)	London	England	Hyde Park	Razorlight; Peter Kay	—	—
Central/North America
October 8, 2005	Oranjestad	Aruba	Aruba Entertainment Center	—	—	—
October 16, 2005	East Rutherford	United States	Meadowlands Arena	—	—	—
October 22, 2005	Los Angeles	United States	Hollywood Bowl	—	16,305 / 16,305	$1,127,840
Asia
October 26, 2005	Saitama	Japan	Saitama Super Arena	—	—	—
October 27, 2005	Saitama	Japan	Saitama Super Arena	—	—	—
October 29, 2005	Yokohama	Japan	Yokohama Arena	—	—	—
October 30, 2005	Yokohama	Japan	Yokohama Arena	—	—	—
November 1, 2005	Nagoya	Japan	Nagoya Dome	—	—	—
November 3, 2005	Fukuoka	Japan	Fukuoka Yahoo! Japan Dome	—	—	—
North America
March 3, 2006	Miami	United States	AmericanAirlines Arena	—	5,897 / 6,000	$573,453
March 4, 2006	Jacksonville	United States	Jacksonville Veterans Memorial Arena	—	3,769 / 5,000	$321,135
March 7, 2006	Duluth	United States	The Arena at Gwinnett Center	—	5,909 / 9,258	$437,087
March 8, 2006	Washington, D.C.	United States	Verizon Center	—	9,475 / 12,571	$844,090
March 10, 2006	Worcester	United States	DCU Center	—	—	—
March 12, 2006	Uniondale	United States	Nassau Veterans Memorial Coliseum	—	7,697 / 11,000	$609,915
March 14, 2006	Philadelphia	United States	Wachovia Spectrum	—	—	—
March 16, 2006	Toronto	Canada	Air Canada Centre	—	11,279 / 11,279	$1,066,519
March 17, 2006	Buffalo	United States	HSBC Arena	—	—	—
March 20, 2006	Pittsburgh	United States	Mellon Arena	—	—	—
March 21, 2006	Cleveland	United States	Quicken Loans Arena	—	6,218 / 9,096	$421,942
March 23, 2006	Rosemont	United States	Allstate Arena	—	7,441 / 9,500	$756,870
March 24, 2006	Auburn Hills	United States	The Palace of Auburn Hills	—	10,296 / 10,296	$707,235
March 26, 2006	Saint Paul	United States	Xcel Energy Center	—	—	—
March 27, 2006	Milwaukee	United States	Bradley Center	—	6,282 / 9,000	$484,394
March 31, 2006	Glendale	United States	Glendale Arena	—	—	—
April 1, 2006	San Diego	United States	Cox Arena at Aztec Bowl	—	6,030 / 7,586	$508,060
April 3, 2006	Anaheim	United States	Arrowhead Pond of Anaheim	—	9,085 / 14,373	$666,735
April 5, 2006	San Jose	United States	HP Pavilion	—	—	—
April 7, 2006	Las Vegas	United States	MGM Grand Garden Arena	—	6,359 / 7,800	$626,355
April 10, 2006	Seattle	United States	KeyArena	—	4,592 / 12,500	$463,195
April 11, 2006	Portland	United States	Rose Garden	—	4,234 / 12,600	$395,380
April 13, 2006	Vancouver	Canada	Pacific Coliseum	—	10,698 / 10,698	$783,598
TOTAL					289,392 / 390,634 (74%)	$10,793,803

=== Cancellations ===
June 11, 2005	Tromsø	Fyllingen Stadium	Cancelled.

== Personnel ==
- Brian May – lead guitar, vocals
- Roger Taylor – drums, percussion, vocals
- Paul Rodgers – lead vocals, guitar, piano
- Freddie Mercury – pre-recorded lead vocals

Additional musicians

- Spike Edney – keyboards, backing vocals
- Danny Miranda – bass guitar, acoustic guitar, backing vocals
- Jamie Moses – rhythm guitar, backing vocals
