= The Freddie Mercury Tribute Concert =

1992 benefit concert

The Freddie Mercury Tribute Concert for AIDS Awareness
- Benefit concert by Queen
- Promotional poster
- Location: London, England
- Venue: Wembley Stadium
- Date: 20 April 1992
- Attendance: 72,000
- Box office: £20 million (equivalent to £42,235,410 in 2023)

Queen concert chronology
- The Magic Tour (1986); The Freddie Mercury Tribute Concert (1992); Queen + Paul Rodgers Tour (2005–06)

The Freddie Mercury Tribute Concert for AIDS Awareness, also known as A Concert for Life, was a benefit concert by British rock band Queen and a number of supporting artists. It took place on 20 April 1992, at Wembley Stadium in London, England.

The concert was a posthumous tribute to Queen's lead vocalist, Freddie Mercury, who had died of an AIDS-related illness on 24 November 1991. It was broadcast live worldwide, and watched by an estimated one billion people.

Proceeds from the concert totalled £20 million, and were used to launch the Mercury Phoenix Trust.

== Background ==
Queen lead singer Freddie Mercury died from AIDS-related complications on 24 November 1991. Mercury had kept his AIDS diagnosis private until the week of his death, and he later was revealed to have donated substantial amounts to AIDS charities that year.

The surviving members of Queen (John Deacon, Brian May, and Roger Taylor) resolved to continue raising money for charity to honour Mercury's legacy. May said the band decided the night of Mercury's death to stage a concert as his memorial, giving him "an exit in the true style to which he's accustomed.".

A wishlist of performers was created by the band, with Elton John and Elizabeth Taylor recruited, since they were already publicly involved with AIDS charities. The band had ruled out a single vocalist performing with them, as they felt Mercury's range could not be duplicated without a variety of singers. May and Taylor publicly announced the event at the Brit Awards on 12 February 1992.

== Production ==
That was a concert to be proud of. I was very pleased about it. It went so well. A bit like Live Aid, the actual atmosphere was non-competitive in terms of showing respect for the other artists.

— Spike Edney, Queen's musical director

Harvey Goldsmith promoted the concert, which was held on 20 April 1992 at London's Wembley Stadium. Queen had previously played their famous Live Aid set at the venue in 1985 and sold out two nights at the stadium for their Magic Tour the following year.

Rehearsals were held at Nomis Studios in London, Bray Film Studios in Water Oakley, and Wembley Stadium on the eve of the concert. Queen assigned their songs to the gathered artists, having decided beforehand which singers would sound best on each track.

About 72,000 tickets were sold for the event. A live television broadcast was produced by Queen, Jim Beach, Dominic Anciano, and Ray Burdis, directed by David Mallet, and broadcast to 70 countries. One billion people were estimated to have watched the concert live on television. The event raised £20 million for the Mercury Phoenix Trust, although the donation was presumed to be less after deducting production costs and travel accommodations for the talent.

== Concert synopsis ==
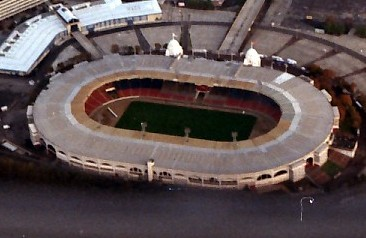
Wembley Stadium (pictured in 1991), where 72,000 fans gathered for the event

The event lasted four and a half hours, exceeding the planned runtime by one hour, and ended at 22:30 BST. Cindy Crawford hosted the event, providing backstage interviews with the day's performers. To raise awareness for the cause, 100,000 red ribbons and 40,000 red scarves were distributed to fans entering the venue.

An onstage introduction from the surviving members of Queen opened the show. The concert then commenced with opening sets from Metallica, Extreme, Def Leppard, Bob Geldof, Spinal Tap, and Guns N' Roses. Prerecorded performances from U2 and Mango Groove were also shown. Elizabeth Taylor was introduced to the stage via satellite by Ian McKellen, and she spoke to the audience about AIDS prevention.

Queen's set began with a video montage of Mercury's call-and-response interactions with his audiences. Their performance featured the surviving Queen members playing with guest singers and guitarists, including Joe Elliott, Slash, Roger Daltrey, Tony Iommi, Zucchero Fornaciari, Gary Cherone, James Hetfield, Robert Plant, Paul Young, Mike Moran, Seal, Lisa Stansfield, David Bowie, Annie Lennox, Phil Collen, Ian Hunter, Mick Ronson, George Michael, Elton John, Axl Rose, John Jones, and Liza Minnelli.

=== Cancelled acts ===
Robert Palmer was advertised as a performer for the concert, but he did not appear.

=== Performances ===
The running order and songs performed:

1. Metallica
  - "Enter Sandman"
  - "Sad but True"
  - "Nothing Else Matters"
2. Extreme
  - Queen medley ("Mustapha", "Bohemian Rhapsody", "Keep Yourself Alive", "I Want to Break Free", "Fat Bottomed Girls", "Bicycle Race", "Another One Bites the Dust", "We Will Rock You", "Stone Cold Crazy", "Radio Ga Ga")
  - “Love of My Life”
  - "More Than Words"
3. Def Leppard
  - "Animal"
  - "Let's Get Rocked"
  - "Now I'm Here" (ft. Brian May)
4. Bob Geldof
  - "Too Late God"
5. Spinal Tap
  - "The Majesty of Rock"
6. U2
  - "Until the End of the World" – prerecorded
7. Guns N' Roses
  - "Paradise City"
  - "Only Women Bleed"
  - "Knockin' on Heaven's Door"
8. Mango Groove
  - "Special Star" – prerecorded
9. Queen (ft. Spike Edney, Josh Macrae, Maggie Ryder, Miriam Stockley, Chris Thompson)
  - "Tie Your Mother Down" (ft. Joe Elliott, Slash)
  - "Heaven and Hell" (ft. Tony Iommi)
  - "Pinball Wizard" (ft. Iommi)
  - "I Want It All" (ft. Roger Daltrey, Iommi)
  - "Las Palabras de Amor" (ft. Zucchero Fornaciari)
  - "Hammer to Fall" (ft. Gary Cherone, Iommi)
  - "Stone Cold Crazy" (ft. James Hetfield, Iommi)
  - "Innuendo" (ft. Robert Plant)
  - "Thank You" (ft. Plant)
  - "Crazy Little Thing Called Love" (ft. Plant)
  - "Too Much Love Will Kill You"
  - "Radio Ga Ga" (ft. Paul Young)
  - "Who Wants to Live Forever" (ft. Mike Moran, Seal)
  - "I Want to Break Free" (ft. Lisa Stansfield)
  - "Under Pressure" (ft. David Bowie, Annie Lennox)
  - "All the Young Dudes" (ft. Bowie, Phil Collen, Elliott, Ian Hunter, Mick Ronson)
  - "Heroes" (ft. Bowie, Ronson)
  - "Lord's Prayer" (ft. Bowie)
  - "'39" (ft. George Michael)
  - "These Are the Days of Our Lives" (ft. Michael, Stansfield)
  - "Somebody to Love" (ft. London Community Gospel Choir, Michael, Moran)
  - "Bohemian Rhapsody" (ft. Elton John, Axl Rose)
  - "The Show Must Go On" (ft. Iommi, John)
  - "We Will Rock You" (ft. Rose)
  - "We Are the Champions" (ft. John Jones, London Community Gospel Choir, Liza Minnelli)
  - "God Save the Queen" – prerecorded

== Reception ==
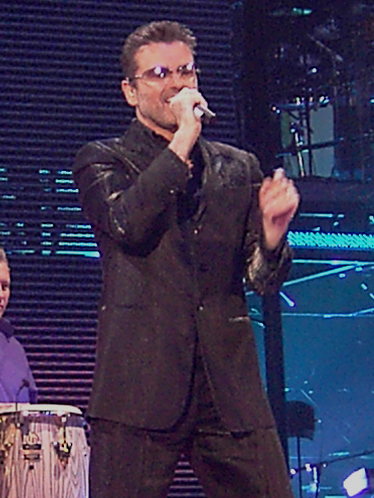
George Michael, whose rendition of "Somebody to Love" was widely praised

The performance of "Somebody to Love" by George Michael and Queen was regarded as the show's highlight. A compilation of Michael's performances from the concert was released as the single "Five Live", which was certified gold in the United Kingdom.

Guns N' Roses singer Axl Rose was protested for his involvement with the event by ACT UP, which accused him of spreading AIDS misinformation through homophobic lyrics in "One in a Million". Rose interrupted his band's performance of "Paradise City" to admonish a demonstrator in the crowd holding up a "Piss Off, Axl!" sign.

== Home releases ==
Picture Music International released the event to VHS on 23 November 1992, with all proceeds going to the Mercury Phoenix Trust.

For the show's 10th anniversary, the concert was remastered by Dione Orrom and released to DVD on 13 May 2002. It was certified Gold in Poland on 3 September 2003, and Platinum in Australia on 1 May 2007.

Eagle Rock Entertainment released the concert to Blu-ray on 22 July 2013. It was certified platinum in the United Kingdom on 2 September 2013.

Queen streamed the event to their YouTube channel on 15 May 2020 to raise money for the COVID-19 Solidarity Response Fund, and again on 20 April 2022 for the show's 30th anniversary to benefit Mercury Phoenix Trust.

== See also ==
- List of highest-grossing benefit concerts
