= Reaching Out (Queen + Paul Rodgers song) =

"Reaching Out" / "Tie Your Mother Down"

Single by Queen + Paul Rodgers

from the album Return of the Champions
- Released: 29 August 2005
- Recorded: Live at Sheffield Hallam FM Arena on May 9, 2005
- Genre: Rock
- Label: Parlophone
- Songwriters: Don Black; Andy Hill; Brian May

Queen + Paul Rodgers singles chronology
"Reaching Out" / "Tie Your Mother Down" (2005)	"Say It's Not True" (2007)

"Reaching Out" / "Tie Your Mother Down" is the debut single by rock band Queen + Paul Rodgers released in 2005 from the album Return of the Champions. It is a medley of the 1996 Rock Therapy charity song "Reaching Out" with Queen's song "Tie Your Mother Down".

== Track listing ==
No.	Title	Length
1.	"Reaching Out / Tie Your Mother Down" (live)	5:39
2.	"Fat Bottomed Girls" (live)	5:48
Total length:		11:27

== Chart performance ==
In 2005, "Reaching Out" peaked at No. 33 on the Dutch Top 40 as a double A-side with "Tie Your Mother Down".

== Credits ==
- Bass – Danny Miranda
- Drums – Roger Taylor
- Guitar – Jamie Moses
- Keyboards – Spike Edney
- Lead guitar – Brian May
- Vocals – Paul Rodgers

== Sampling ==
This song was sampled by American rapper Eminem in "Beautiful" from Eminem's sixth album Relapse (2009).
