= László Papp Budapest Sports Arena =

Sports venue in Budapest, Hungary

- Budapest Sports Aréna
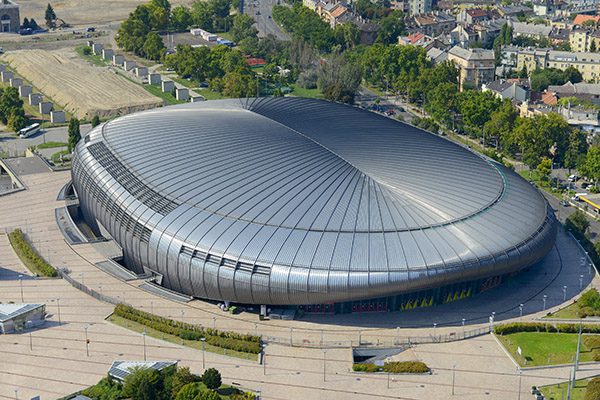
- Budapest Sports Aréna in September 2016
- Interactive map of László Papp Budapest Sports Arena
- Full name: Papp László Budapest Sportaréna
- Location: Budapest, Hungary
- Coordinates: 47°30′6.99″N 19°6′19.41″E
- Operator: BSÜ; Bouygues
- Capacity: 11,390 (boxing); 12,000 (handball); 9,479 (ice hockey); 12,500 (concerts)

Construction
- Groundbreaking: 30 June 2001
- Opened: 13 March 2003
- Architects: KÖZTI; Sport Concepts

Tenant
- Hungary men's national ice hockey team

Website
- budapestarena.hu

The László Papp Budapest Sports Arena (Hungarian: Papp László Budapest Sportaréna), also known as Budapest Sports Arena or locally just Arena, is a multi-purpose indoor arena in Budapest, Hungary. It is the second biggest sports complex in the country after MVM Dome, which is also in the capital, and it is named after Hungarian boxer László Papp. The venue can hold up to 12,500 people in its largest concert configuration, up to 11,390 for boxing and 9,479 for ice hockey. It was built as a replacement for the Budapest Sports Hall (Hungarian: Budapest Sportcsarnok, or BS for short) which stood in the same place and was destroyed in a fire in December 1999. A long-distance bus station is situated under the building.

== History ==
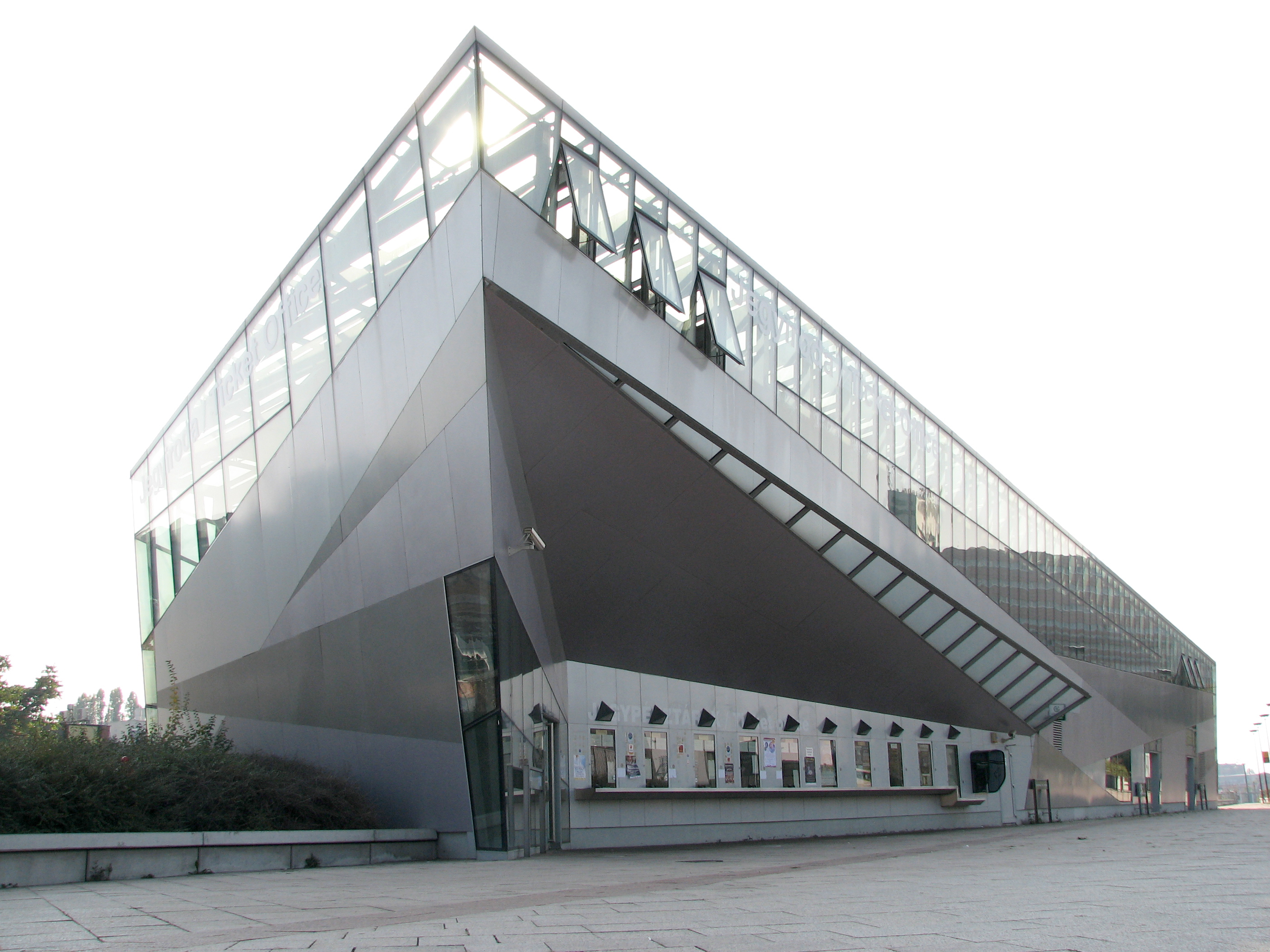
The box office of the arena (October 2008)

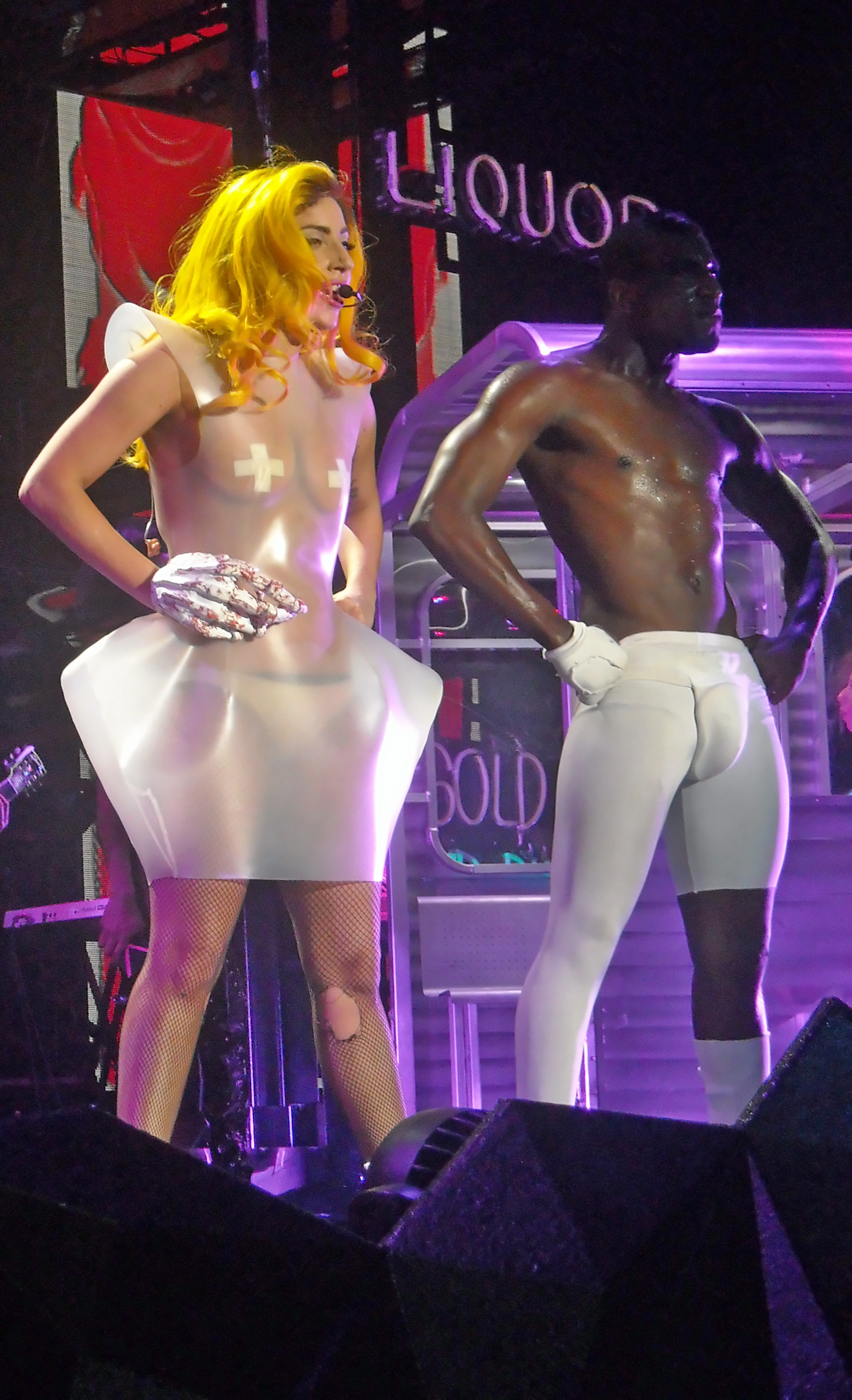
Lady Gaga during a 2010 concert in the László Papp Budapest Sports Arena

Construction of the arena began on 30 June 2001, after the original, the Budapest Sportcsarnok, built in 1982, burnt to the ground on 15 December 1999. The hall was finished quickly, within a year and a half, and the opening ceremony was held on 13 March 2003. Since 28 May 2004, the arena wears the name of Hungarian boxing great László Papp and is officially known as Papp László Budapest Sports Arena.

The building has a total weight of 200,000 tons and contains 50,000 tons of concrete, 2,300 tons of steel structure, more than 11,000,000 bolts and several kilometres of cable.

The state-of-the-art multifunctional plaza is capable of hosting almost any sort of sporting or civic event, such as basketball, gymnastics, ice skating and ice hockey, and other athletics events. It can also host extreme or thrilling events like monster trucks, motocross, jet-skiing or indoor wave surfing competitions. The arena also is the top venue in the area for touring international musicians and performers, as well as dance recitals, operas, dramas, circuses, musicals and a variety of other special events.

=== Sporting events ===
The first major international event held in the arena was the 2003 IIHF World Championship Division I, in which the hosts finished third. Next year the 2004 IAAF World Indoor Championships was organized in the hall between 5 and 7 March, followed by the final rounds and placement matches of the 2004 European Women's Handball Championship in December. A year later, Budapest Sports Arena hosted the 2005 World Wrestling Championships.

In 2007, the Hungarian Ice Hockey Federation celebrated its 80th anniversary with a friendly match against defending Olympic and World champions Sweden, played at the arena. In a closely fought battle, Hungary finally triumphed 2–1 in overtime against the Scandinavians to the delight of their 8,000 fans.

Starting from 2008, every year in the Budapest Sports Arena takes place the Tennis Classics, an exhibition tennis tournament with participation of former and current tennis aces. During the years, Budapest welcomed players like Stefan Edberg, Mats Wilander, Ivan Lendl or Thomas Muster and reigning stars, such as Robin Söderling and Tomáš Berdych. In addition, beside the Főnix Hall in Debrecen, Budapest Sports Arena was the other host venue of the 2010 UEFA Futsal Championship.

Between 17 and 23 April 2011, the arena was the home of the 2011 IIHF World Championship Division I. The event enjoyed particular attention by the fans throughout the week and the number of 8700 spectators that attended on the decisive last-round match between Hungary and Italy is close to equal to the figures produced by the top division World Championship final, held a week later in Bratislava, Slovakia.

Following the decision of the European Handball Federation Executive Committee, the organization rights of the 2014 European Women's Handball Championship were awarded to Croatia and Hungary. Budapest Sports Arena was set to host the conclusive stage of the tournament, including the semifinals, the bronze medal match and final.

The Final Four of the Women's EHF Champions League has been annually taking place in the arena since 2014.

The 2017 World Judo Championships was also held in the Arena.

At the 2022 European Men's Handball Championship and for the next main handball events in Hungary, the arena is replaced by the New Budapest Arena.

== Fire system ==
The building is protected by several fire safety systems. One of these is the protection alarm system, which in the event of a fire gives off the alarm within three seconds. The Budapest Sports Arena is also equipped with a fire hydrant system that, in the case of a catastrophe, can be used at more than sixty positions in the building. Every point of the arena can be reached with the help of the fire hoses. As a unique feature in Hungary, the building also contains three high-output water cannons. All three are positioned in the auditorium protecting the area that caused the destruction of the arena's predecessor. The Arena also has numerous fire doors that automatically lock in the case of a fire, so preventing the further spreading of a fire.

== Entertainment events ==
Concerts at László Papp Budapest Sports Arena
Date	Artists	Event
2003
23 April	Bryan Adams	
15 May	Paul McCartney	
4 June	Harlem Globetrotters	
18 June	Yes	
23 June	Dave Gahan	
16 October	Eros Ramazzotti	
24 October	Bob Dylan	Never Ending Tour 2003
3 November	Robbie Williams	Cock of Justice Tour
18 November	Deep Purple	
2004
23 March	Limp Bizkit	Results May Vary Tour
3 April	Buena Vista Social Club	
5 April	Pink	Try This Tour
25 April	Ennio Morricone	
15 May	Peter Gabriel	
23 May	Britney Spears	The Onyx Hotel Tour
2 June	Cher	Living Proof: The Farewell Tour
21 July	Santana	
8 September	Sarah Brightman	Harem World Tour
4 December	David Copperfield	
9 December	Diana Krall	
2005
22 January	R.E.M.	
17 February	Anastacia	Live at Last Tour
26 February	Andrea Bocelli	
27 February	Rammstein	
17 April	Seal	
23 April	Queen + Paul Rodgers	2005 - 2006 Tour
4 May	Mark Knopfler	
24 May	Joe Cocker	
5 June	Avril Lavigne	Bonez Tour
8 June	Duran Duran	
9 June	Green Day	American Idiot World Tour
23 August	Marilyn Manson	
26 October	Phil Collins	
12 November	Tiësto	
4 December	Simple Red	
2006
26 February	Deep Purple	
5 March	Chris Rea	
21 March	Depeche Mode	
10 April	Liza Minnelli	
22 April	Eros Ramazzotti	
23 May	Il Divo	
24 May	Ricky Martin	
31 May	Guns N' Roses	Chinese Democracy Tour
19 June	50 Cent	
20 June	Sting	
18 July	Eric Clapton	
21 November	Bryan Adams	
29 November	Aida	
2007
5 March	Shakira	Oral Fixation Tour
14 April	Roger Waters	The Dark Side of the Moon Live
16 September	Black Eyed Peas	Black Blue & You Tour
10 October	Muse	Black Holes and Revelations Tour
19 October	Gwen Stefani	The Sweet Escape Tour
30–31 October	Cirque du Soleil	Delirium
2008
29 February–1 March	Cirque du Soleil	Delirium
12 May	Mark Knopfler	
15 May	Kylie Minogue	KylieX2008
10 September	Snoop Dogg	
23 September	Coldplay	Viva la Vida Tour
25 October	James Blunt	
28 October	Queen + Paul Rodgers	Rock the Cosmos Tour
12 November	Jean Michel Jarre	
2009
23 March	AC/DC	Black Ice World Tour
24 March	Pink	Funhouse Tour
29 April	Beyoncé	I Am... World Tour
1 July	Dream Theater	
15 October	ZZ Top	
11 November	Tom Jones	
2010
11 January	Depeche Mode	
16 March	Rammstein	
24 May	Jean Michel Jarre	
28 May	Kiss	
15 September	Placebo	
1 October	Katy Perry	
4 October	Ozzy Osbourne	
6 November	Sting	
7 November	Lady Gaga	The Monster Ball Tour
9–12 December	Cirque du Soleil	Saltimbanco
2011
21 March	Faithless	
8 April	Slayer - Megadeth	
5 May	Shakira	The Sun Comes Out World Tour
1 June	Roxette	
6 June	Scorpions	
22 June	Roger Waters	The Wall Live
30 June	Sting	
5 July	Santana	
19 September	George Michael	Symphonicity Tour
30 September	Britney Spears	Femme Fatale Tour
10 November	Rammstein	
23 November	Sade	Sade Live
8 December	Rihanna	Loud Tour
2012
17 February	Dream Theater	
27 March	Loreena McKennitt	
28 April	The Prodigy	
29 April	Nightwish	
15 May	André Rieu	
17–20 May	Cirque du Soleil	Alegría
27 June	Julio Iglesias	
28 June	Duran Duran	
19 July	Bryan Adams	
17 October	Dead Can Dance	
20 November	Muse	
2013
5–6 February	Michael Jackson: The Immortal World Tour	
7 February	Slash	
28 March	Yanni	
6 April	Vaya Con Dios	
8 April	Eros Ramazzotti	
22 June	Mark Knopfler	
7 November	Bruno Mars	
8 November	Nickelback	
9 November	Andrea Bocelli	
2014
15 February	Ennio Morricone	
17 February	Deep Purple	
25 April	Robbie Williams	Swings Both Ways Live
31 May	André Rieu	
18 October	Kylie Minogue	Kiss Me Once Tour
2 November	Michael Bublé	To Be Loved Tour
2015
5 February	Slipknot	
13–15 February	Cirque du Soleil	Quidam
19 May	Roxette	
20 May	André Rieu	
7 June	OneRepublic	Native Tour
29–30 August	Violetta	Violetta Live
22–23 October	Lord of the Dance	
18 November	Slash	
23 November	Andrea Bocelli	
12 December	Nightwish	
2016
17 January	Ennio Morricone	
29 February	Scorpions	50th Anniversary Tour
26 April	Lara Fabian	
11 May	Hans Zimmer	
19 May	André Rieu	
1 June	Black Sabbath	The End Tour
22 June	Anastacia	Ultimate Collection Tour
1 September	Red Hot Chili Peppers	The Getaway World Tour
2 September	Red Hot Chili Peppers	The Getaway World Tour
16 September	Nickelback	No Fixed Address Tour
9 October	Bryan Adams	
27 October	The Cure	
8 November	Ian Gillan	
10 November	Jean Michel Jarre	
11 November	Placebo	
12 December	Eros Ramazzotti	
29 December	Gloria Gaynor	
2017
20 January	José Carreras	
27 February	Lindsey Stirling	
17 March	Mireille Mathieu	
3 April	Tini	Got Me Started Tour
12–14 May	Cirque du Soleil	Varekai
30 May	Bruno Mars	24K Magic World Tour
1 June	Hans Zimmer	
16 June	André Rieu	
18 June	Green Day	Revolution Radio Tour
26 June	Foo Fighters	Concrete and Gold Tour
13 October	Sting	
18 October	Ennio Morricone	
4 November	Queen + Adam Lambert	Queen + Adam Lambert Tour 2017-2018
5 November	James Newton Howard	
6 November	Chris Rea	
13 November	Gorillaz	Humanz Tour
25 November	Andrea Bocelli	
20 December	Sarah Brightman	
2018
29 January	Rod Stewart	
2 February	Depeche Mode	Global Spirit Tour
18 February	Emeli Sandé	
21 February	Kraftwerk	
26 February	Caro Emerald	
11–12 March	Enrique Iglesias	All the Hits Live
5 April	Metallica	WorldWired Tour
8 April	Lara Fabian	
2 May	Roger Waters	Us + Them Tour
4 May	Rag'n'Bone Man	
8 May	James Blunt	The Afterlove Tour
3 June	Lenny Kravitz	
17 June	Arcade Fire	
23 June	Massive Attack	
24 June	Judas Priest	
16 July	Quincy Jones	
15 August	David Helfgott	
4 September	Ricky Martin	
10 October	David Garrett	
20 November	Nightwish	
19 December	José Carreras	
2019
18 January	Blake	
23 January	Ennio Morricone	
16 February	Guido & Maurizio De Angelis	
25 February	Nicki Minaj	The Nicki Wrld Tour
12 March	Mike Shinoda	
29 March	Loreena McKennitt	
14 April	Rhoda Scott	
15 May	Giorgio Moroder	
24 May	Vanessa-Mae	
28 May	Muse	
11 June	Slayer	
17 June	System of a Down	
22 June	Tom Jones	
23 June	Maluma	11:11 World Tour
25 June	Backstreet Boys	DNA World Tour
26 June	Dead Can Dance	A Celebration – Life and Works 1980-2019
27 June	Toto	40 Trips Around The Sun Tour
2 July	Sting	My Songs Tour
9 July	Mark Knopfler	Down the Road Wherever Tour
17 July	Paul Anka	Celebrating 60 Years of Hits - His Way
17 August	Luis Fonsi	Vida World Tour
29 September	Il Volo	Musica Tour
24 October	Eros Ramazzotti	Vita Ce N’è World Tour
5 October	Boris Brejcha	
16 November	Andrea Bocelli	
3 December	Ghost	A Pale Tour Named Death
9 December	Deep Purple	The Long Goodbye Tour
2020
22 January	Sabaton	
4 February	Slipknot	We Are Not Your Kind World Tour
8 February	Dream Theater	
20 February	Five Finger Death Punch	
3 March	Mireille Mathieu	
4 March	Papa Roach	
2022
11 April	Hans Zimmer	Europe Tour 2022
8 May	Dead Can Dance	Europa - 2022
11 May	2Cellos	Dedicated World Tour
13 May	OneRepublic	
18 May	Ghost	Imperatour
24 May	Tool	
30 May	Scorpions	Rock Believer Tour
21 June	Korn	
23 June	Postmodern Jukebox	
5 July	Five Finger Death Punch	
11 July	Judas Priest	
12 July	Pearl Jam	Gigaton Tour
13 July	Harry Styles	Love On Tour
14 July	Kiss	End of the Road World Tour
10 September	Mero	
27 September	Harlem Globetrotters	Spread Game
2 October	Sum 41 & Simple Plan	
15 October	Andrea Bocelli	
20 October	Lara Fabian	
25 October	50 Cent	
26 October	The Cure	Cure Tour Euro 22
27 October	Sting	My Songs Tour
28 October	Il Divo	
5 November	Boris Brejcha	
2023
14 March	Robbie Williams	XXV Tour
19 April	Eros Ramazotti	
16 May	Måneskin	Loud Kids Tour Gets Louder
21 May	Diana Krall	
22 May	Pentatonix	Pentatonix: The World Tour
1 June	Bring Me the Horizon	
5 June	Hans Zimmer	
9 July	Manfred Mann's Earth Band	
16 July	Deep Purple	Whoosh! Tour
18 July	Hollywood Vampires	
15 September	Louis Tomlinson	Faith in the Future World Tour
27 September	Two Steps from Hell	
9 October	Il Volo	
10 October	5 Seconds of Summer	The 5 Seconds of Summer Show
18 October	50 Cent	The Final Lap Tour
20 November	Black Veil Brides	
29 November	José Carreras	
2024
16 January	The King's Singers	When You Wish Upon A Star
7 March	LP	Love Lines Tour
17 March	The Rose	Dawn to Dusk Tour
31 April	Sting	
13 June	Tool	
29 June	Scorpions	Love at First Sting Tour
9 July	Five Finger Death Punch	
30 July	Lenny Kravitz	Blue Electric Light Tour 2024
24 September	Il Divo	20th Anniversary Tour
6 October	Omara Portuondo	Farewell Tour
1 November	Dream Theater	40th Anniversary Tour
12 November	Sum 41	Tour of the Setting Sum
2025
3 February	Pantera	
19 February	Cyndi Lauper	Girls Just Wanna Have Fun Farewell Tour
12 March	Alan Walker	Walkerworld
27–28 May	Iron Maiden	Run for Your Lives World Tour
26 June	Jean-Michel Jarre	

== See also ==
- List of indoor arenas in Hungary

Events and tenants
Preceded by National Indoor Arena, Birmingham	IAAF World Indoor Championships in Athletics; Venue; 2004	Succeeded by Olimpiysky Stadium, Moscow
Preceded by Atletion, Aarhus	European Women's Handball Championship; Final venue 2004	Succeeded by Hovet, Stockholm
Preceded by Madison Square Garden, New York City and Palais des Sports Robert Oubron, Créteil	FILA Wrestling World Championships; Venue; 2005	Succeeded by Tianhe Sports Center, Guangzhou
Preceded by Traktor Ice Arena, Chelyabinsk	European Judo Championships; Venue; 2013	Succeeded by Park&Suites Arena, Montpellier
Preceded by Sinan Erdem Dome, Istanbul and Millennium Place, Strathcona County	FILA Wrestling World Championships; Venue; 2013	Succeeded by Tashkent
