= Rock Therapy =

"Reaching Out"

Single by Rock Therapy
- Released: 1996
- Genre: Rock
- Label: EMI

Rock Therapy was a 1996 one-off project consisting of Queen guitarist Brian May, Rolling Stones drummer Charlie Watts, plus a number of guest vocalists including Sam Brown, Andy Fairweather Low, Paul Rodgers and Lulu. This was a 3-track charity CD issued in aid of the Nordoff-Robbins Music Therapy Centre, which helps special needs children to communicate through the medium of music.

The song "Reaching Out" peaked at number 126 on the UK charts. Queen + Paul Rodgers performed the song live during their 2005–2006 tour, and released three recordings: one on their 2005 double live album Return of the Champions (also issued on the single "Reaching Out/Tie Your Mother Down"), and two as download-only tracks. The live version was sampled in 2009 by Eminem for the track "Beautiful" from his album Relapse.

== Track listing ==
1. "Reaching Out"
2. "Reaching Out" (acoustic)
3. "Reaching Out" (instrumental)
