= Live in Ukraine =

Live album by Queen + Paul Rodgers
- Released: 15 June 2009 (CD & DVD)
- Recorded: 12 September 2008 in Kharkiv
- Genre: Rock
- Length: 120:26
- Label: Parlophone (Europe); Hollywood (US)
- Producer: Joshua J Macrae; Justin Shirley Smith; Kris Fredriksson

Queen + Paul Rodgers chronology
The Cosmos Rocks (2008)	Live in Ukraine (2009)

Live in Ukraine is a double live album and video and also last release by British rock collaboration Queen + Paul Rodgers. It was recorded in September 2008 during the Rock the Cosmos Tour at Freedom Square in Kharkiv, Ukraine and was released on 15 June 2009. A companion DVD was also released.

== History ==
Just weeks ahead of the start of the Rock the Cosmos Tour the band were approached to help Ukraine's Olena Pinchuk AntiAids Foundation reach out to the youth of the country with this message: ‘Don’t Let AIDS Ruin Your Life”.

The venue they played was Kharkiv's historic Freedom Square, a place so big that during World War II it was used to land planes. For the band and crew it meant “Everyone had to run very fast, very suddenly, but then most of the great and worthwhile things in your life are a little dangerous.”

Over 350,000 Ukrainians came to see them play and more than 10,000,000 (by conservative estimates) homes watched the show live on television. In all, more than 20,000,000 took part in what the band recall as “an unforgettable experience… one of those rare things in life you know you will never forget. A meeting in music, but also a coming together to fight a common enemy…”

=== Film ===
A concert movie that captured live 12 September from Ukraine in Kharkiv's Freedom Square before 350,000 fans was produced by NCM Fathom and Disney’s Hollywood Records. It was shown in U.S. movie theatres one night only – Thursday, 6 November 2008.

On March 19, 2022, the film premiered in the Queen Official YouTube channel in order to raise relief funds (Note: collected by the United Nations High Commissioner for Refugees) for Ukrainian refugees, due to the country's invasion by Russia. More than 5 million dollars have been raised.

== Track listing ==
=== Disc 1 ===
Kharkiv's Freedom Square

1. "One Vision" (Freddie Mercury, Brian May, Roger Taylor, John Deacon) - 4:03
2. "Tie Your Mother Down" (May) - 2:29
3. "The Show Must Go On" (Mercury, May, Taylor, Deacon) - 4:37
4. "Fat Bottomed Girls" (May) - 5:00
5. "Another One Bites the Dust" (Deacon) - 3:35
6. "Hammer to Fall" (May) - 3:42
7. "I Want It All" (Mercury, May, Taylor, Deacon) - 4:10
8. "I Want to Break Free" (Deacon) - 3:55
9. "Seagull" (Paul Rodgers, Mick Ralphs) - 4:50
10. "Love of My Life" (Mercury) - 5:45
  - Lead vocals by May.
11. "'39" (May) - 4:37
  - Lead vocals by May.
12. "Drum Solo" (Taylor) - 5:00
13. "I'm in Love with My Car" (Taylor) - 3:42
  - Lead vocals by Taylor.
14. "Say It's Not True" (Taylor) - 4:02
  - Lead vocals by Taylor, May & Rodgers.

=== Disc 2 ===
1. "Shooting Star" (Rodgers) - 6:21
2. "Bad Company" (Simon Kirke, Rodgers) - 5:36
3. "Guitar Solo" (May) - 3:58
4. "Bijou" (Queen) - 2:07
  - Lead vocals by Mercury (via tape)
5. "Last Horizon" (May) - 4:32
6. "Crazy Little Thing Called Love" (Mercury) - 4:04
7. "C-lebrity" (Taylor) - 3:52
8. "Feel Like Makin' Love" (Rodgers, Ralphs) - 6:45
9. "Bohemian Rhapsody" (Mercury) - 5:53
  - Pre-recorded vocals by Mercury, with lead vocals by Rodgers.
10. "Cosmos Rockin'" (Taylor) - 4:28
11. "All Right Now" (Andy Fraser, Rodgers) - 5:31
12. "We Will Rock You" (May) - 2:19
13. "We Are the Champions" (Mercury) - 2:59
14. "God Save the Queen" (Traditional, arr. May) - 2:05

=== Digital Download bonus track ===
1. "A Kind of Magic" (Taylor) - 5:43
2. "Radio Ga Ga" (Taylor) - 6:15

== Personnel ==
- Freddie Mercury: Pre-recorded lead (Bijou, Bohemian Rhapsody) and backing vocals, and pre-recorded piano (Bohemian Rhapsody).
- Brian May: Guitars, arrangements, vocals.
- Roger Taylor: Drums, percussion, vocals.
- Paul Rodgers: Vocals, guitars, piano.
- Spike Edney: Keyboards, percussion, vocals.
- Jamie Moses: Guitars, vocals.
- Danny Miranda: Bass guitar, acoustic guitar, vocals.

== Formats ==
- DVD Amaray Box
- Limited Edition (2CD Album + DVD)
- Tin Box (2CD Album + DVD + T-shirt)
- Digital Download (Audio only)

== Chart performance ==
Chart (2009)	Peak position
US Billboard 200	111
US Top Rock Albums (Billboard)	44
