= Say It's Not True =

Single by Queen + Paul Rodgers

from the album The Cosmos Rocks
- Released: 1 December 2007 (download); 31 December 2007 (CD single)
- Recorded: November 2007
- Genre: Hard rock
- Length: 4:02
- Label: EMI, Parlophone
- Songwriters: Queen + Paul Rodgers (Roger Taylor)
- Producers: Queen + Paul Rodgers; Josh Macrae; Justin Shirley Smith; Kris Fredriksson

Queen + Paul Rodgers singles chronology
"Reaching Out" (2005)	"Say It's Not True" (2007)	"C-lebrity" (2008)

Original Cover

Music video
- "Say It's Not True" on YouTube

"Say It's Not True" is a song by Queen + Paul Rodgers, released on World AIDS Day, 1 December 2007 as the lead single from the supergroup's sole album, The Cosmos Rocks. The song was written by drummer Roger Taylor and features all three members on vocals. It was available as a free download from QueenOnline.com. The song was performed live on the Queen + Paul Rodgers 2005/06 world tour, however the live rendition was acoustic and only featured Taylor on vocals. When played on the Rock the Cosmos Tour, the song was sung by Taylor, May and Rodgers as on the single.

The song was written for Nelson Mandela's AIDS foundation 46664, hence being performed live by Queen at the first 46664 concert on 29 November 2003. Roger Taylor on vocals was additionally supported by David A. Stewart playing guitar.

On 31 December 2007, the song was released as a CD single, with all proceeds going to 46664.

== Live recordings ==
- Return of the Champions CD/LP/DVD (2005)
- Super Live in Japan DVD (2006) (Japan only)
- Live in Ukraine CD/DVD/DOWNLOAD (2009)

== Chart positions ==
Due to the single's availability to download for free, chart positions were severely affected particularly in Germany, France, the Netherlands and the UK where the sale of downloads account for much of a song's chart positioning.

- Number 5 (Italy, airplay/download)
- Number 34 Netherlands (Dutch Top 40
- Number 62 (Netherlands (Single Top 100)
- Number 68 (Romania)
- Number 75 (France)
- Number 82 (Germany)
- Number 90 (UK)
