= Queen + Paul Rodgers =

British band (2004–2009)

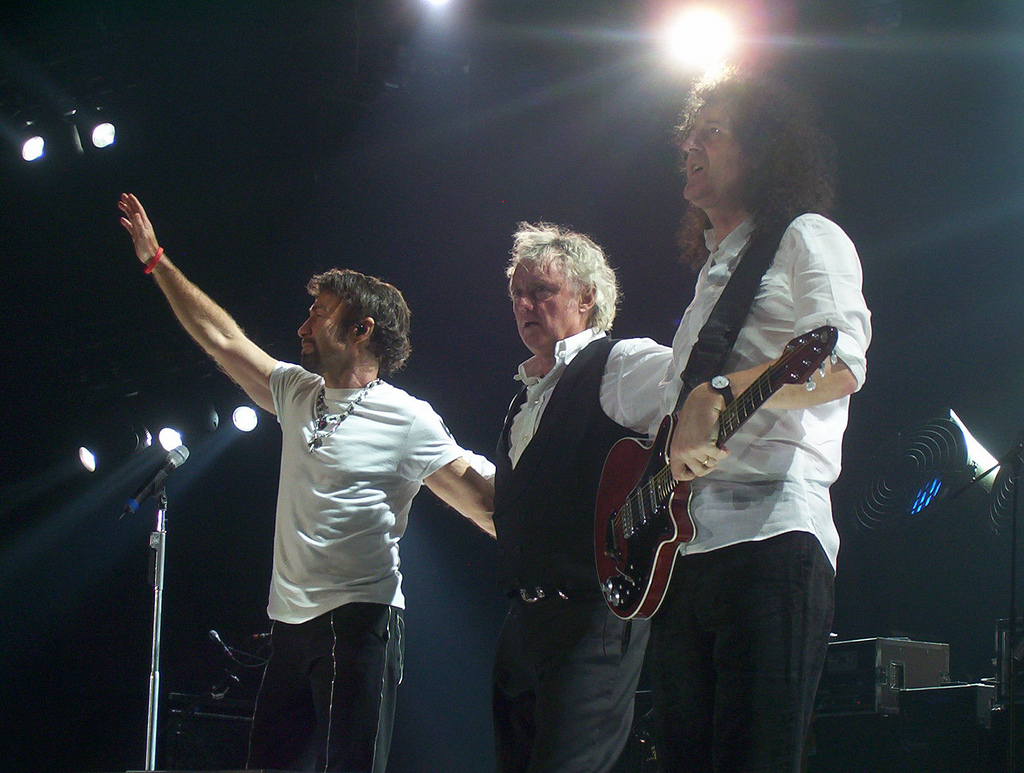
- L–R: Paul Rodgers, Roger Taylor and Brian May in 2005

Background information
- Origin: England
- Genres: Rock, pop, hard rock, heavy metal, pop rock
- Years active: 2004–2009
- Labels: Hollywood; Parlophone
- Spinoff of: Queen; Bad Company
- Past members: Brian May; Roger Taylor; Paul Rodgers

Queen + Paul Rodgers (sometimes referred to as Q+PR or QPR) was a collaboration between Queen (Brian May and Roger Taylor) and Paul Rodgers, formerly of Bad Company, Free, The Firm, and The Law. Guitarist May had previously performed with Rodgers on several occasions, including a performance at the Royal Albert Hall.

After they first performed together at the 10 October 2004 induction of Queen to the UK Music Hall of Fame, it was made clear that Rodgers would not be replacing Queen's former lead singer, Freddie Mercury, who died on 24 November 1991, and instead would simply be "featured with" past Queen members. Former Queen bass guitarist John Deacon declined to participate in the collaboration after having retired in 1997. The group's three principal members, May, Taylor, and Rodgers, were supplemented on tour by Queen's former touring keyboard player Spike Edney, rhythm guitarist Jamie Moses, and bass guitarist Danny Miranda, who had previously worked with Blue Öyster Cult. The collaboration spanned two world tours, the studio album The Cosmos Rocks, two live albums, and three live DVDs.

Rodgers announced in May 2009 that the Queen + Paul Rodgers collaboration had come to an end, saying, "it was never meant to be a permanent arrangement." He did, however, leave open the possibility for future collaborations, later realized as Queen + Adam Lambert.

== Beginnings (2004) ==
The origins of the collaboration came when May played at the Fender Strat Pack concert in 2004. As he had done multiple times before (but beforehand nothing really happened as far as Queen were concerned), he joined Rodgers for a rendition of Free's classic, "All Right Now". After this, May spoke of a chemistry between the two of them. Following this, May invited Rodgers to play with Queen at their 10 October 2004 induction to the UK Music Hall of Fame where they played "We Will Rock You", "We Are the Champions" and "All Right Now". Again citing a new excitement with Rodgers, the three announced their world tour in 2005.

== Return of the Champions Tour (2005–2006) ==
The group's first public performance was at a concert in South Africa in March 2005 in support of Nelson Mandela's 46664 AIDS awareness campaign. The tour began properly with a concert at the Brixton Academy venue in London, with tickets sold primarily to members of the official Queen fan club. An arena tour of Europe followed in spring 2005, with dates at venues such as Wembley Pavilion, Cardiff International Arena and Le Zénith in France. Four outdoor stadium dates were scheduled for the first time in Portugal at Estadio do Restelo (Att: 30,000), at Rhein-Energie Stadion in Cologne, Germany (Att:27,500), Gelredome in Arnhem, the Netherlands (Att:25,000) and at Hyde Park in the UK (Att:65,000) in the summer of 2005.

The Estadio do Restelo concert took place on 2 July 2005. The Queen + Paul Rodgers concert was planned to be one of the stages for Live 8 but only a message was sent before "'39". Two songs were dedicated to Live 8. "Say It's Not True", a song by Taylor for Nelson Mandela's fight against HIV/AIDS in Africa, was introduced by Taylor in Lisbon: "This is a song from Nelson Mandela and for HIV/AIDS Africa, especially today on Live 8-day. This is a song to Lisbon." After this song, May dedicated "'39" to Bob Geldof and introduced the song: "Olá Lisboa! I would like to make a salute to all our comrades and friends who are doing such a wonderful job and trying that children throughout the world are no longer hungry; let's make a big noise for Bob Geldof and Live 8".

The Hyde Park concert took place on 15 July 2005. The band and management gave away thousands of free tickets to emergency services people for helping in the aftermath of the 7 July 2005 London bombings, which caused the concert to be postponed by a week. British comedian Peter Kay, who had also appeared during the encore at their Manchester gig in May that year, warmed up the crowd, with the band Razorlight as the support act. The concert was attended by some 65,000 people, and Queen + Paul Rodgers performed for over 2 hours.

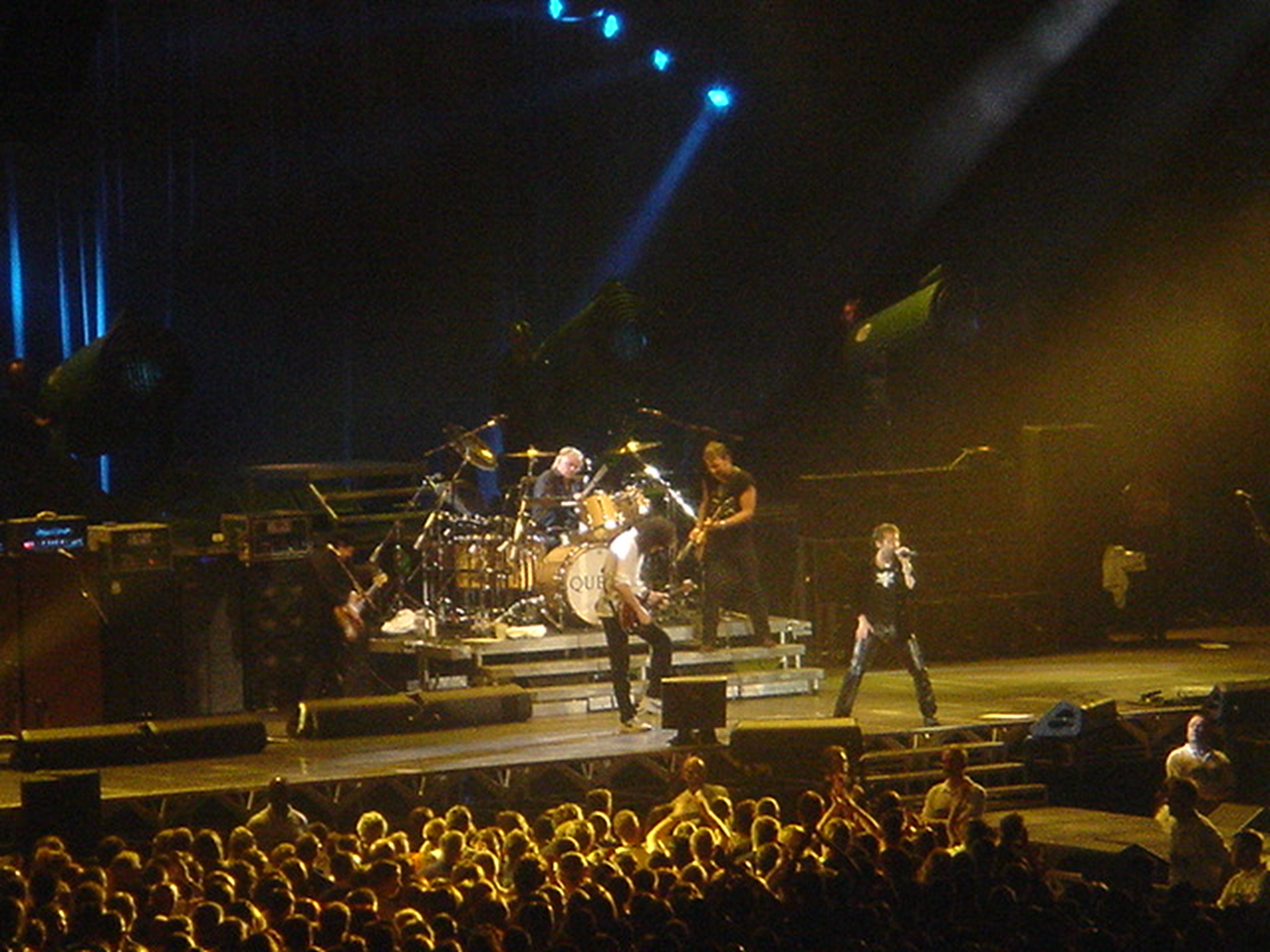
From the 2005 Queen + Paul Rodgers Tour

A typical set list mainly focused on Queen's best-known hits, with songs such as "Crazy Little Thing Called Love", "We Will Rock You", "We Are the Champions", and "Bohemian Rhapsody". In an interview published in the San Jose Mercury News, Rodgers said that the one song they would not be able play while on tour was "Killer Queen", due to the fact that "the melodies are just too on the spot". The typical set also included some songs from the back catalogues of Free and Bad Company, such as "All Right Now", "Wishing Well", "Feel Like Making Love", and "Bad Company". May and Taylor sang lead on some songs. May: "Hammer to Fall" (the first part only), "Love of My Life", "'39" (on which he sang lead on the studio version originally). Taylor: "Radio Ga Ga" (both verses and first two choruses), "These Are the Days of Our Lives", "Say It's Not True" (a new song), and "I'm in Love with My Car" (on which he sang lead on the studio version originally as well). Taylor often left the drum kit (the exception being "I'm in Love with My Car") while a drum machine played on "Radio Ga Ga" and "These Are the Days of Our Lives". For "Say It's Not True", he would be accompanied by auxiliary band members Miranda and Moses, who both played acoustic guitars (except for the 46664 concert, in which Taylor was accompanied by May and Moses – which was the only time May played guitar on this song during the tour).

In addition to well known favourites and hits, there were a number of occasional "surprise" additions to the setlist, including: "I Was Born to Love You" (Japan only), "Imagine" (John Lennon cover, Hyde Park only), "Teo Torriatte" (Japan only), "Too Much Love Will Kill You" (feat. Katie Melua, South Africa only), '"Long Away" (selected shows only), "Tavaszi Szel" (Budapest only) and "Let There Be Drums" (Sandy Nelson cover performed at most gigs). "Sunshine of Your Love" was played in Newcastle as testament to the Cream reunion gig in London going on at the same time (3 May). May had been present at the Cream show on 2 May, which possibly inspired him to do it. The band also added "Dragon Attack" to a number of shows on the 2006 North American tour.

Queen + Paul Rodgers followed the European tour with a series of performances in fall 2005, in such diverse locations as Aruba, Japan and the United States of America. Slash, lead guitarist of the band Guns N' Roses and formerly Velvet Revolver, joined the band for "Can't Get Enough" during their show at the legendary Hollywood Bowl, the second of their two-show trial run in North America (22 October 2005).

In early 2006, Queen + Paul Rodgers played a 23-date tour of North America. The tour started at the American Airlines Arena in Miami (first Florida date since 1978, first official USA tour since 1982) and ended with a sold-out performance in Vancouver, Canada (where they also covered the Jimi Hendrix song "Red House" – the only performance of this song on the tour).

== The Cosmos Rocks (2006–2008) ==
On 15 August 2006, May confirmed through his website and fan club that Queen + Paul Rodgers would begin producing their first studio album in October, to be recorded at a "secret location". The album, titled The Cosmos Rocks, was released in the European Union on 15 September 2008 and in the United States on 28 October 2008. It was Queen's sixteenth studio album and the first since 1995's Made in Heaven.

May later recalled: "We spent a huge amount of time making that album with Paul Rodgers, going through quite a lot of pain, and I don't think it made the slightest dent on public consciousness. So I would be cautious about being in a recording group called Queen without Freddie."

== Rock the Cosmos Tour (2008) ==
On 27 June 2008, Queen + Paul Rodgers performed at Hyde Park in London for Nelson Mandela's 90th birthday celebration. The performance included a portion of "One Vision", "Tie Your Mother Down", "Show Must Go On", "We Will Rock You", "We Are the Champions", and "All Right Now". Following this, the group embarked on the Rock the Cosmos Tour, opening on 12 September with an AIDS-benefit concert to an audience of over 350,000 people in Kharkiv, Ukraine. The tour then moved to Russia, before continuing around Europe. The concert in Ukraine was later made into a film for world AIDS day and subsequently DVD Live in Ukraine. On November 19, as part of their Latin American tour, they performed at the Estadio San Carlos de Apoquindo, Santiago, Chile. This tour did include a rare performance of "Las Palabras de Amor" and the first ever live performance of "Bijou".

== Split (2009) ==
In May 2009, with a summer reunion tour with Bad Company looming, the singer told Billboard.com that the Queen + Paul Rodgers collaboration is, in effect, over, and without animosity. "At this point we're gonna sit back from this," Rodgers says. "My arrangement with (Queen's Brian May and Roger Taylor) was similar to my arrangement with Jimmy (Page) in The Firm in that it was never meant to be a permanent arrangement. I think we made a huge success of it, actually. We did two world tours and a couple of live recordings, and...made a studio album [...] which was pretty historical for (Queen's Brian May and Roger Taylor) because they hadn't really gone in the studio with anybody and recorded something like that for a very long time. So it was quite an achievement, I think."

Rodgers does not rule out the possibility of working together again, however. "It's kind of an open book, really. If they approach me to do something for charity, for instance, or something like that...I'd be very much into doing that, for sure."

== Possible reunion ==
In May 2011, Jane's Addiction vocalist Perry Farrell noted that Queen are currently scouting his once former and current live bassist Chris Chaney to join the band. Farrell stated: "I have to keep Chris away from Queen, who want him and they're not gonna get him unless we're not doing anything. Then they can have him."

In the same month, Rodgers stated he may tour with Queen again in the near future, stating that he enjoyed the collaboration and may work with them again soon. However, on 3 June, Brian May denied rumours of a reunion, saying: "There is no talk of that happening."

In April 2012, Paul Rodgers suggested that they will do some concerts in the future. Though over the following decade, nothing materialised, with Paul Rodgers developing recent health issues.

== Other performances ==
Queen + Paul Rodgers performed at the VH1 Rock Honors Show in 2006 performing "The Show Must Go On", "We Will Rock You" (with Dave Grohl and Taylor Hawkins on drums), "We Are the Champions" and "Under Pressure". Queen + Paul Rodgers appeared on Al Murray's Happy Hour in April (2008) performing "C-lebrity" for the first time from their debut album The Cosmos Rocks.

Queen + Paul Rodgers appear on Eminem's 2009 album Relapse. The song "Beautiful" samples "Reaching Out" which was used as Queen + Paul Rodgers's live show opener on the 2005–06 tour. "Reaching Out" was originally released as a charity single by Rock Therapy, a band which contained both Rodgers and May.

== Media releases ==
Queen + Paul Rodgers released a single for World AIDS Day (1 December) in 2007. The track, "Say It's Not True", written by Roger Taylor became first available for free download on 30 November, and was subsequently released as a proper CD single on 31 December.

Previously, Queen + Paul Rodgers have released a live CD called Return of the Champions and a DVD of the same name. Both featured recordings from their Sheffield Hallam FM Arena concert on 9 May 2005. The DVD also features a cover of John Lennon's "Imagine" from Hyde Park. A single featuring "Reaching Out"/"Tie Your Mother Down"/"Fat Bottomed Girls" was also released. In addition, an American promo featuring two tracks taken from the Italian leg of the European tour was available with some copies of Return of the Champions.

Soundboard recordings exist of all European shows, except those in Ireland and Sweden. Sheffield, Lisbon, Hyde Park and possibly Budapest concerts were professionally filmed. The Tokyo show on 26 October 2005 was also professionally filmed and televised, and later released on DVD exclusively in Japan in April 2006, entitled "Super Live in Japan". Multiple soundboard recordings of tracks were released for download on the Queen official website, with blank Q+PR CD-Rs to burn these tracks available for purchase.

There are also a number of bootlegs from nearly every show of the 2005/2006 tour in audio, and some video.

== Band members ==
- Paul Rodgers – lead vocals, piano, rhythm guitar, harmonica
- Brian May – lead guitars, vocals
- Roger Taylor – drums, percussions, vocals

Touring musicians

- Spike Edney – keyboards, piano, backing vocals
- Jamie Moses – guitar, bass, backing vocals
- Danny Miranda – bass, acoustic guitar, backing vocals
- Neil Murray – bass (for only two shows)

== Discography ==
=== Studio albums ===
Year	Album details	Peak chart positions										Certifications (sales thresholds)
Year	Album details	UK	AUS	AUT	FRA	GER	NL	NZ	SWE	SWI	US	Certifications (sales thresholds)
2008	The Cosmos Rocks: Released: September 2008; Label: EMI	5	49	11	28	4	8	—	24	5	47	UK: Silver
"—" denotes the album chart unknown or wasn't released in that country

=== Live albums ===
Year	Album details	Peak chart positions								Certifications
Year	Album details	UK	AUS	AUT	FRA	GER	NL	SWI	US	Certifications
2005	Return of the Champions: Released: October 2005; Label: Parlophone	12	107	19	80	13	19	42	84	
2009	Live in Ukraine: Released: 15 June 2009 (CD+DVD); Label: Parlophone	—	—	65	171	43	49	—	111	

=== Singles ===
Year	Single	Peak chart positions							Album
Year	Single	UK	AUT	FRA	GER	NL	SWI	US	Album
2005	"Reaching Out / Tie Your Mother Down"	—	—	—	—	27	22	—	Return of the Champions
2007	Say It's Not True	90	—	75	82	62	—	—	The Cosmos Rocks
2008	"C-lebrity"	33	—	96	67	50	—	17	The Cosmos Rocks

Promo singles

Year	Single	Album
2005	"Live from Italy"	Non-album single
2005	"We Will Rock You / We Are the Champions"	Return of the Champion
2008	"We Believe"	The Cosmos Rocks
2008	"Call Me"	The Cosmos Rocks

=== Videography ===
Year	Album details	Peak chart positions		Certifications
Year	Album details	US	UK	Certifications
2005	Return of the Champions: Released: October 2005; Label: Parlophone	13	1	
2006	Super Live in Japan: Released: June 2006 (Japan Only); Label: EMI	—	N/A	
2009	Live in Ukraine: Released: 15 June 2009 (CD & DVD); Label: Parlophone	—	2	

== See also ==
- Queen + Adam Lambert
