= The Cosmos Rocks =

Studio album by Queen + Paul Rodgers
- Released: 15 September 2008
- Recorded: October 2006 – August 2008
- Studio: The Priory (Surrey, England)
- Genre: Hard rock, blues rock
- Length: 58:46
- Label: Parlophone; Hollywood
- Producer: Brian May; Roger Taylor; Paul Rodgers

Queen + Paul Rodgers chronology
Return of the Champions (2005)	The Cosmos Rocks (2008)	Live in Ukraine (2009)

Singles from The Cosmos Rocks
- 1. "Say It's Not True" Released: 1 December 2007; 2. "C-lebrity" Released: 8 September 2008

The Cosmos Rocks is the only studio album by Queen + Paul Rodgers (and Queen's sixteenth studio album overall), released on 15 September 2008. It contains 14 new tracks written by Brian May, Roger Taylor, and Paul Rodgers. This is the first studio album of new material from the two remaining members of Queen since 1995's Made in Heaven, and thus the first album not to feature Freddie Mercury or John Deacon.

== History ==
The band entered Roger Taylor's Priory studio in late 2006, having completed the American leg of a world tour. Sessions were initially scheduled around Rodgers' other touring commitments. On tour, the band had debuted a new song, "Take Love", although it did not make the album (Rodgers would later record his own version of the song for his 2023 solo album Midnight Rose). On his solo tour, Rodgers debuted songs such as "Warboys" and "Voodoo".

John Deacon's retirement meant that bass duties were shared between Rodgers and May.

The first single, "Say It's Not True" was released nine months before the album. The second, "C-lebrity" was previewed on Al Murray's Happy Hour in April, five months before the album.

The album's release came 17 years after the death in 1991 of former Queen singer Freddie Mercury.

"It had some great stuff on it," Taylor recalled. "I just think that Paul's more blues and soul – one of our favourite singers, ever, but, when it boils down to it, he wasn't the perfect frontman for us. I felt the album was badly promoted by EMI, who were falling to bits at the time. We were on tour in Europe, and I went into record stores and we weren't in them. And I remember being furious, thinking, 'Why did we make this fucking record?'"

May later recalled: "We spent a huge amount of time making that album with Paul Rodgers, going through quite a lot of pain, and I don't think it made the slightest dent on public consciousness. So I would be cautious about being in a recording group called Queen without Freddie."

== Singles ==
Three singles were released from the album:

- "Say It's Not True" was the lead single from the album, released in the UK on 31 December 2007; it reached #90 in the British charts although had been available as free download for some time. Its video features many clips of the suffering in South Africa as well as clips from Nelson Mandela's 46664 concerts. The single was released for the 46664 charity, with all proceeds being donated there.
- "C-lebrity" was released as the album's second single on 8 September 2008, reaching number 33 on the UK Singles Chart. Its B-side was a recording of "Fire and Water" live in Japan.
- "We Believe" was released as a promo single in Italy, and reached number 4 in the Virgin radio charts. It was edited down from its original 6-minute album version to less than 4 minutes.

== Critical reaction ==
Professional ratings
Aggregate scores
Source	Rating
Metacritic	42/100
Review scores
Source	Rating
AllMusic	2/5 stars
Blender	1/5 stars
Evening Standard	3/5 stars
The Guardian	2/5 stars
Mojo	3/5 stars
The Observer	1/5 stars
PopMatters	7/10
Rolling Stone	2/5 stars
The Skinny	1/5 stars
Uncut	2/5 stars

The Cosmos Rocks received mixed reviews. According to critic review aggregator Metacritic, the album received an average review score of 42/100, indicating "Mixed or average reviews". Alexis Petridis of The Guardian gave it two out of five stars, stating, "the lyrics were stupid, trite, a bit offensive and bound to have an undermining effect on whatever musical efforts they put behind it". Conversely, PopMatters gave it a 7/10 review, stating, "Paul Rodgers breathes new life into Queen, while still keeping the band's tremendous legacy intact as they soldier forth with new material into the 21st century". Mojo gave it three stars, stating, "Occasionally they stumble, as on the clunky 'Warboys.' But with Rodgers imperious, Queen's second coming is vindicated".

== Tour ==
The "Rock the Cosmos Tour" began in September 2008 to promote the release of this album. The opening date was recorded for a DVD release, and was broadcast across digital video theatres across the United States on 6 November 2008 under the title "Let the Cosmos Rock". The tour included one of the largest open-air concerts in Kharkiv, Ukraine, which garnered 350,000 people. Over the course of the tour, Queen played to just short of a million viewers.

== Track listing ==
=== Original release ===
All regular tracks credited to Queen + Paul Rodgers.

No.	Title	Writer(s)	Length
1.	"Cosmos Rockin'"	Roger Taylor	4:10
2.	"Time to Shine"	Paul Rodgers	4:23
3.	"Still Burnin'"	Brian May	4:04
4.	"Small"	Taylor	4:39
5.	"Warboys"	Rodgers	3:18
6.	"We Believe"	May	6:08
7.	"Call Me"	Rodgers	2:59
8.	"Voodoo"	Rodgers	4:27
9.	"Some Things That Glitter"	May	4:03
10.	"C-lebrity"	Taylor	3:38
11.	"Through the Night"	Rodgers	4:54
12.	"Say It's Not True"	Taylor	4:00
13.	"Surf's Up... School's Out!"	Taylor	5:56
14.	"Small Reprise"	Taylor	2:03

iTunes exclusive bonus track
No.	Title	Writer(s)	Length
15.	"Runaway"	Del Shannon, Max Crook	5:28
16.	"The Show Must Go On" (Queen + Paul Rodgers, Live in Japan 2005)	May	4:35

Amazon.com bonus track
No.	Title	Writer(s)	Length
15.	"Fire and Water (Live from Japan)" (B-side to "C-lebrity" single)	Rodgers, Andy Fraser	2:51

=== Limited edition bonus DVD (Super Live in Japan – Highlights) ===
1. "Reaching Out" (Hill, Black)
2. "Tie Your Mother Down" (May)
3. "Fat Bottomed Girls" (May)
4. "Another One Bites the Dust" (Deacon)
5. "Fire and Water" (Rodgers, Andy Fraser)
6. "Crazy Little Thing Called Love" (Mercury)
7. "Teo Torriatte (Let Us Cling Together)" (May)
8. "These Are the Days of Our Lives" (Queen)
9. "Radio Ga Ga" (Taylor)
10. "Can’t Get Enough" (Mick Ralphs)
11. "I Was Born to Love You" (Mercury)
12. "All Right Now" (Rodgers, Fraser)
13. "We Will Rock You" (May)
14. "We Are the Champions" (Mercury)
15. "God Save the Queen" (Traditional; arranged by May)

Note: The Japanese edition includes a CD audio version instead of the DVD.

== Personnel ==
- Brian May – guitar, backing and lead vocals, bass, keyboards, piano
- Roger Taylor – drums, backing and lead vocals, percussion, keyboards
- Paul Rodgers – lead vocals, guitar, bass, keyboards, piano, harmonica
- Taylor Hawkins – backing vocals on "C-lebrity"

== Charts ==
Chart (2008)	Peak position
Australian Albums (ARIA)	49
Austrian Albums (Ö3 Austria)	11
Belgian Albums (Ultratop Flanders)	18
Belgian Albums (Ultratop Wallonia)	16
Croatian International Albums (HDU)	22
Czech Albums (ČNS IFPI)	4
Danish Albums (Hitlisten)	24
Dutch Albums (Album Top 100)	8
Finnish Albums (Suomen virallinen lista)	15
French Albums (SNEP)	28
German Albums (Offizielle Top 100)	4
Hungarian Albums (MAHASZ)	15
Irish Albums (IRMA)	47
Italian Albums (FIMI)	6
Norwegian Albums (VG-lista)	31
Polish Albums (ZPAV)	22
Portuguese Albums (AFP)	25
Spanish Albums (Promusicae)	20
Swedish Albums (Sverigetopplistan)	24
Swiss Albums (Schweizer Hitparade)	5
UK Albums (OCC)	5
US Billboard 200	47
US Top Rock Albums (Billboard)	16

== Certifications ==
Region	Certification	Certified units/sales
Russia (NFPF)	Gold	10,000^{*}
United Kingdom (BPI)	Silver	60,000^{^}
^{*} Sales figures based on certification alone.^{^} Shipments figures based on certification alone.

== Formats ==
- Standard CD
- Special edition CD and DVD
- Tour edition (Queen Online only)
- Gatefold vinyl
- iTunes Music Store edition
