= C-lebrity =

Single by Queen + Paul Rodgers

from the album The Cosmos Rocks
- B-side: "Fire and Water" (Live in Japan)
- Released: 8 September 2008
- Recorded: 2007
- Genre: Hard rock
- Length: 3:38
- Label: EMI, Parlophone
- Songwriter(s): Roger Taylor
- Producer(s): Queen + Paul Rodgers; Joshua J Macrae; Justin Shirley Smith; Kris Fredriksson

Queen + Paul Rodgers singles chronology
"Say It's Not True" (2007)	"C-lebrity" (2008)

"C-lebrity" is a song by Queen + Paul Rodgers, released as the second single from the album The Cosmos Rocks. The song reached No. 1 on the UK Rock Singles Chart.

== Overview ==
The song was released on September 8, 2008 and was available on CD, 7" vinyl and digital downloadable formats.

On August 4, 2008 the track was premiered for the first time on Ken Bruce's radio show on BBC Radio 2.

It received its live debut on the series finale of ITV's Al Murray's Happy Hour.

Taylor Hawkins of Foo Fighters sang backing vocals. Brian May plays bass guitar on the track.

The song was released as downloadable content as part of a Queen Track Pack for Guitar Hero: World Tour on March 26, 2009.

== Composition ==
The song tells the story from the point of view of an aspiring celebrity, who does not let their apparent lack of talent hold them back.

The song's main riff bears a strong resemblance to that of the 1990 Judas Priest song "A Touch of Evil".

== Queen + Paul Rodgers on the single ==
C-lebrity was born of a great lyrical idea from Roger—a theme very relevant right now—the current obsession with fame, the cult of Celebrity. I threw in some riffs to hang it on, and some arrangement ideas, and Paul tore in and tore it up! It was Paul’s idea to present things from the point of the view of the aspiring Talent Show contestant, in a positive way. We chose this track as a first taster from the album, performing it live on Al Murray’s TV show. It got a great reaction, so we went back in, roughed up the studio version a bit… and there it is. I think it gives a fair idea of the kind of energy on the album—our first studio creation together. I think we sound like a group ! These things have to happen organically.

— Brian May

C-lebrity is really a comment on the current concept of fame, success, and all that goes with it. Getting your face on TV is enough—talent doesn’t really enter into the equation. "Celebrity" is an overused and devalued word today.

— Roger Taylor

I see the song as Roger's take on the increasing emphasis on fame for its own sake. It’s quite ironic that Andy Warhol's statement that everyone will have fifteen minutes of fame is becoming something of a reality, although it may be down to fifteen seconds in today’s world of instant communication.

— Paul Rodgers

== Track listing ==
All songs written by Queen + Paul Rodgers except where noted

7"

1. "C-lebrity" – 3:38
2. "Fire and Water (Live in Japan)" (Rodgers, Andy Fraser) – 3:46

CD

1. "C-lebrity" – 3:38
2. "C-lebrity" (Video)

Maxi CD

1. "C-lebrity" – 3:38
2. "Say It's Not True" – 4:01
3. "Tie Your Mother Down (Live in Sheffield)" (Brian May) – 4:30
4. "C-lebrity" (Video)
5. "Say It's Not True" (Video)

== Chart positions ==
Chart (2008)	Position
France (SNEP)	96
Germany (GfK)	67
Netherlands (Single Top 100)	50
Scotland (OCC)	4
UK Rock & Metal (OCC)	1
UK Singles (OCC)	33
