= Last Horizon =

Single by Brian May

from the album Back to the Light
- B-side: "'39" / "Let Your Heart Rule Your Head" (live)
- Released: 6 December 1993
- Recorded: Sarm
- Genre: Instrumental rock
- Length: 4:10
- Label: Parlophone
- Songwriter: Brian May
- Producers: Brian May, Justin Shirley-Smith

Brian May singles chronology
"Resurrection" (1993)	"Last Horizon" (1993)	"The Man from Manhattan" (1994)

"Last Horizon" is a guitar solo written by Queen's guitarist Brian May. It is a slow, poignant solo, with a sad tone.

== Overview ==
The record was released on December 6, 1993 as a single from its parent album, Back to the Light, and remained on the UK charts for two weeks, peaking at number 51. The b-sides of the single included live tracks that were later released on the album Live at the Brixton Academy.

May plays the composition at every one of his concerts since then (including the Queen + Paul Rodgers and Queen + Adam Lambert tours). "Last Horizon" was included on the live albums Return of the Champions (2005) and Live in Ukraine (2009), and also on Starmus - Sonic Universe (2011) by Tangerine Dream and May.

== Track listing ==
7-inch single

1. "Last Horizon" (album version) – 4:10
2. "'39" / "Let Your Heart Rule Your Head" (live version) – 4:22

CD single

1. "Last Horizon" (radio edit) – 3:06
2. "Last Horizon" (live version) – 3:14
3. "We Will Rock You" (live version) – 4:46
4. 'Last Horizon" (album version) – 4:10

== Personnel ==
- Co-producer, engineer – Justin Shirley-Smith
- Design – Richard Gray
- Producer, cover, concept – Brian May
