= Return of the Champions =

Live album by Queen + Paul Rodgers
- Released: 13 September 2005
- Recorded: 9 May 2005
- Venues: Hallam FM Arena, Sheffield, England
- Genres: Rock, hard rock
- Length: 101:00
- Labels: Parlophone (Europe); Hollywood (US)
- Producers: Joshua J. Macrae, Justin Shirley-Smith, Peter Brandt

Queen + Paul Rodgers chronology
| Return of the Champions (2005) | The Cosmos Rocks (2008) |

Singles from Return of the Champions
- 1. "Reaching Out (Live)"/"Tie Your Mother Down (Live)" Released: 29 August 2005 (Europe)

Return of the Champions is a double live album by English rock band Queen + Paul Rodgers. All of the tracks, apart from "Imagine", were recorded in May 2005 during the Queen + Paul Rodgers Tour at the Hallam FM Arena in Sheffield, England. "Imagine" was performed in Hyde Park, London on 15 July 2005. The performance was meant to take place on 8 July, but was postponed due to the London bombings that occurred the previous day. The album was released on 19 September 2005. A companion DVD was released in October, directed by David Mallet.

Professional ratings
Review scores
| Source | Rating |
|---|---|
| Allmusic | link |
| Robert Christgau | D+ link |
| The Rolling Stone Album Guide | 1/5 stars |

== Track listing ==
All lead vocals performed by Paul Rodgers, except where noted.

=== Disc 1 ===
Track List
| No. | Title | Writer(s) | Original Album | Length |
|---|---|---|---|---|
| 1. | "Reaching Out" | Don Black, Andy Hill |
| 2. | "Tie Your Mother Down" | Brian May | A Day at the Races (1976 / Queen) |
| 3. | "I Want to Break Free" | John Deacon | The Works (1984 / Queen) |
| 4. | "Fat Bottomed Girls" | May | Jazz (1978 / Queen) |
| 5. | "Wishing Well" | Free | Heartbreaker (1973 / Free Album) |
| 6. | "Another One Bites the Dust" | Deacon | The Game (1980 / Queen) |
| 7. | "Crazy Little Thing Called Love" | Freddie Mercury | The Game |
| 8. | "Say It's Not True" (Lead Vocals by Taylor) | Roger Taylor | The Cosmos Rocks (2008) |
| 9. | "'39" (Lead Vocals by May) | May | A Night at the Opera (1975 / Queen) |
| 10. | "Love of My Life" (Lead Vocals by May) | Mercury | A Night at the Opera |
| 11. | "Hammer to Fall" (Lead Vocals by May & Rodgers) | May | The Works |
| 12. | "Feel Like Makin' Love" | Paul Rodgers, Mick Ralphs | Straight Shooter (1975 / Bad Company) |
| 13. | "Let There Be Drums" | Sandy Nelson, Richard Podolor |
| 14. | "I'm in Love With My Car" (Lead Vocals by Taylor) | Taylor | A Night at the Opera |
| 15. | "Guitar Solo" (Brighton Rock) |
| 16. | "Last Horizon" | May | Back to the Light (1992 / Brian May) |

=== Disc 2 ===
Track List
| No. | Title | Writer(s) | Original Album | Length |
|---|---|---|---|---|
| 1. | "These Are the Days of Our Lives" (Lead Vocals by Taylor) | Taylor | Innuendo (1991 / Queen) |
| 2. | "Radio Ga Ga" (Lead Vocals by Taylor & Rodgers) | Taylor | The Works |
| 3. | "Can't Get Enough" | Ralphs | Bad Company (1974 / Bad Company) |
| 4. | "A Kind of Magic" | Taylor | A Kind of Magic (1986 / Queen) |
| 5. | "I Want It All" (Lead Vocals by Rodgers & May) | May | The Miracle (1989 / Queen) |
| 6. | "Bohemian Rhapsody" (Pre-Recorded Vocals by Mercury, With Lead Vocals by Rodgers) | Mercury | A Night at the Opera |
| 7. | "The Show Must Go On" | May | Innuendo |
| 8. | "All Right Now" | Andy Fraser, Rodgers | Fire and Water (1970 / Free) |
| 9. | "We Will Rock You" | May | News of the World (1977 / Queen) |
| 10. | "We Are the Champions" | Mercury | News of the World |
| 11. | "God Save the Queen" | Traditional, Arr. May | A Night at the Opera |

DVD Tracks
| No. | Title | Writer(s) | Original Album | Length |
|---|---|---|---|---|
| 12. | "It's a Beautiful Day" (Remix / Pre-Recorded Vocals by Mercury) | Mercury | Made in Heaven (1995 / Queen) |
| 13. | "Imagine" (Live at Hyde Park / Lead Vocals by May, Taylor & Rodgers) | John Lennon |

NOTES: Tracks 12–13 are bonus songs from the DVD

== Personnel ==
- Paul Rodgers – lead vocals, guitars
- Brian May – guitars, arrangements, vocals
- Roger Taylor – drums, percussion, vocals
- Spike Edney – keyboards, percussion, vocals
- Jamie Moses – guitars, vocals
- Danny Miranda – bass guitar, acoustic guitar, vocals
- Freddie Mercury – pre-recorded vocals ("Bohemian Rhapsody", "Beautiful Day"), pre-recorded piano ("Bohemian Rhapsody")

== Charts ==
=== Album ===
| Chart (2005) | Peak position |
|---|---|
| Australian Albums (ARIA) | 107 |
| Austrian Albums (Ö3 Austria) | 19 |
| Belgian Albums (Ultratop Flanders) | 52 |
| Belgian Albums (Ultratop Wallonia) | 39 |
| Dutch Albums (Album Top 100) | 19 |
| French Albums (SNEP) | 80 |
| German Albums (Offizielle Top 100) | 13 |
| Irish Albums (IRMA) | 47 |
| Italian Albums (FIMI) | 19 |
| Portuguese Albums (AFP) | 28 |
| Scottish Albums (Official Charts) | 10 |
| Spanish Albums (Promusicae) | 44 |
| Swiss Albums (Schweizer Hitparade) | 42 |
| UK Albums (Official Charts) | 12 |
| UK Rock & Metal Albums (Official Charts) | 2 |
| US Billboard 200 | 84 |

=== DVD ===
| Chart (2005) | Peak position |
|---|---|
| Australian Music DVDs Chart | 16 |
| Austrian Music DVDs Chart | 2 |
| Belgian (Flanders) Music DVDs Chart | 7 |
| Belgian (Wallonia) Music DVDs Chart | 6 |
| Danish Music DVDs Chart | 10 |
| Dutch Music DVDs Chart | 2 |
| Greek Music DVDs Chart | 3 |
| Italian Music DVDs Chart | 4 |
| Spanish Music DVDs Chart | 6 |
| US Music Videos Chart | 13 |

== Certifications ==
| Region | Certification | Certified units/sales |
|---|---|---|
| Australia (ARIA) | Gold | 7,500^{^} |
| France (SNEP) | Gold | 10,000^{*} |
| Germany (BVMI) | Gold | 25,000^{^} |
^{*} Sales figures based on certification alone.^{^} Shipments figures based on certification alone.
