= Radio Ga Ga =

- UK single picture sleeve

Single by Queen

from the album The Works
- A-side: "Radio Ga Ga" (extended)
- B-side: "Radio Ga Ga" (instrumental): "I Go Crazy"
- Released: 23 January 1984
- Recorded: 1983
- Studio: The Record Plant, Los Angeles
- Genre: Synth-pop; synth-rock; new wave; stadium rock; pop rock
- Length: 5:48 (7" album version); 4:23 (radio edit); 6:53 (12" extended version); 6:01 (12" instrumental version)
- Label: EMI (UK); Capitol (US)
- Songwriter: Roger Taylor
- Producers: Queen; Reinhold Mack

Queen singles chronology
"Back Chat" (1982)	"Radio Ga Ga" (1984)	"I Want to Break Free" (1984)

Music video
- "Radio Ga Ga" on YouTube

"Radio Ga Ga" is a 1984 song by the British rock band Queen, written by their drummer Roger Taylor. It was released as a single with "I Go Crazy" by Brian May as the B-side. It was included as the opening track on the album The Works and is also featured on the band's compilation albums Greatest Hits II and Classic Queen.

Although Queen had long had individual songwriting contributions from all members, this marked the first time a song individually credited to Taylor was chosen as the A-side of a single in their home country ("Calling All Girls" had been a minor hit in the US and Canada in 1982).

The song, which makes a nostalgic defence of the radio format, was a worldwide success for the band, reaching number one in 19 countries, number two on the UK singles chart and the Australian Kent Music Report and number 16 on the US Billboard Hot 100, becoming the band's final original single to reach the US top 40 in Freddie Mercury's lifetime on that chart (whereas their follow-up singles would give them frequent top 40 appearances on the Mainstream Rock chart). The band performed the song at every concert from 1984 to their last concert with lead singer Freddie Mercury in 1986, including their performance at Live Aid in 1985.

The music video for the song uses footage from the 1927 silent science fiction film Metropolis. It received heavy rotation on music channels and was nominated for an MTV Video Music Award in 1984.

== Background ==
The inspiration for the song came when Taylor heard his son utter the phrase "radio ca-ca" while they were driving in Los Angeles, reacting to a song playing on the radio that he disliked.

A nostalgic defence of radio, the lyrics are a commentary on television overtaking radio's popularity and how one would listen to radio in the past for a favourite comedy, drama, or science fiction programme. It also addressed the advent of the music video and MTV, which was then competing with radio as an important medium for promoting records. Taylor was quoted:

That's part of what the song's about, really. The fact that they [music videos] seem to be taking over almost from the aural side, the visual side seems to be almost more important.

The song refers to two important radio events of the 20th century: Orson Welles' 1938 broadcast of H. G. Wells's The War of the Worlds in the lyric "through wars of worlds/invaded by Mars", and Winston Churchill's 18 June 1940 "This was their finest hour" speech from the House of Commons, in the lyric "You've yet to have your finest hour".

== Recording ==
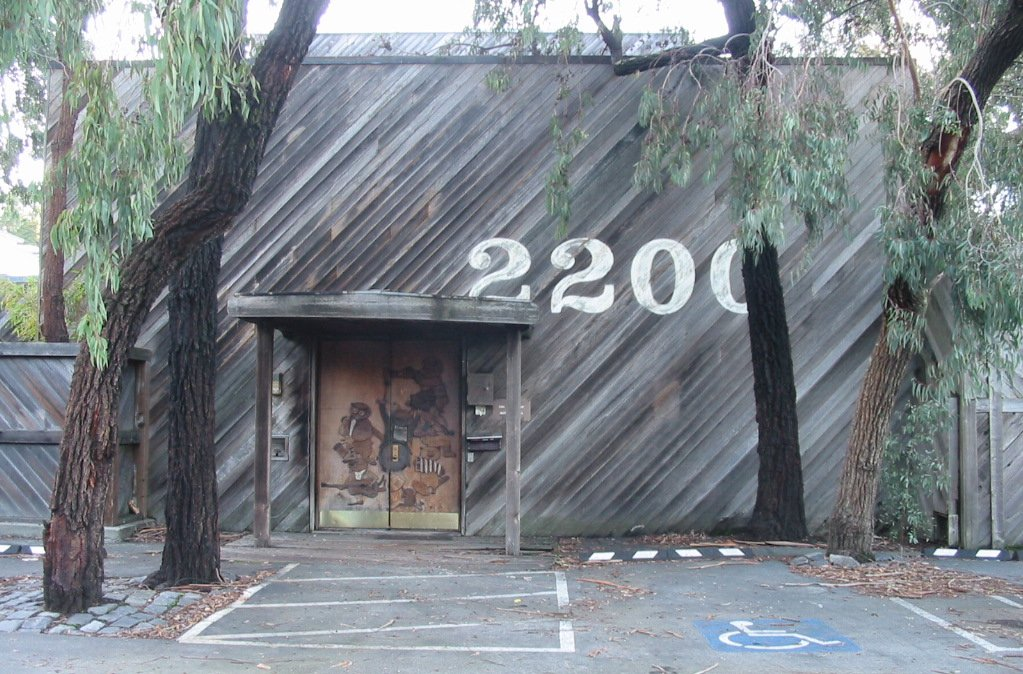
Queen and producer Mack recorded the song at Record Plant Studios, Los Angeles through August and early September 1983

After hearing his son's phrase, Taylor began writing and developing the song when he locked himself in a studio for three days with a synthesizer and a LinnDrum drum machine. He initially thought the track would fit his solo album, but when the band heard it, John Deacon wrote a bassline and Freddie Mercury reconstructed the track, thinking it could be a big hit. Taylor then took a skiing holiday and let Mercury polish the song's lyrics, harmony, and arrangements. Recording sessions began at Record Plant Studios in Los Angeles in August 1983, the band's first and only time recording in North America. The recording features prominent use of the Roland VP330+ vocoder. Canadian session keyboardist Fred Mandel, who had played with Queen during the Hot Space Tour, programmed the Roland Jupiter-8's arpeggiated synth-bass parts.

== Commercial performance ==
"Radio Ga Ga" reached number one in Belgium, Denmark, Finland, Ireland, Italy, Netherlands, Portugal, and Sweden. In the United Kingdom, the track entered the UK Singles Chart on 4 February 1984 and peaked at number two for two consecutive weeks starting on 11 February, unable to dislodge "Relax" by Frankie Goes To Hollywood from the top spot. In the United States, it entered Billboard Hot 100 on 18 February 1984 and reached a peak of number 16 on 7 April.

== Music video ==
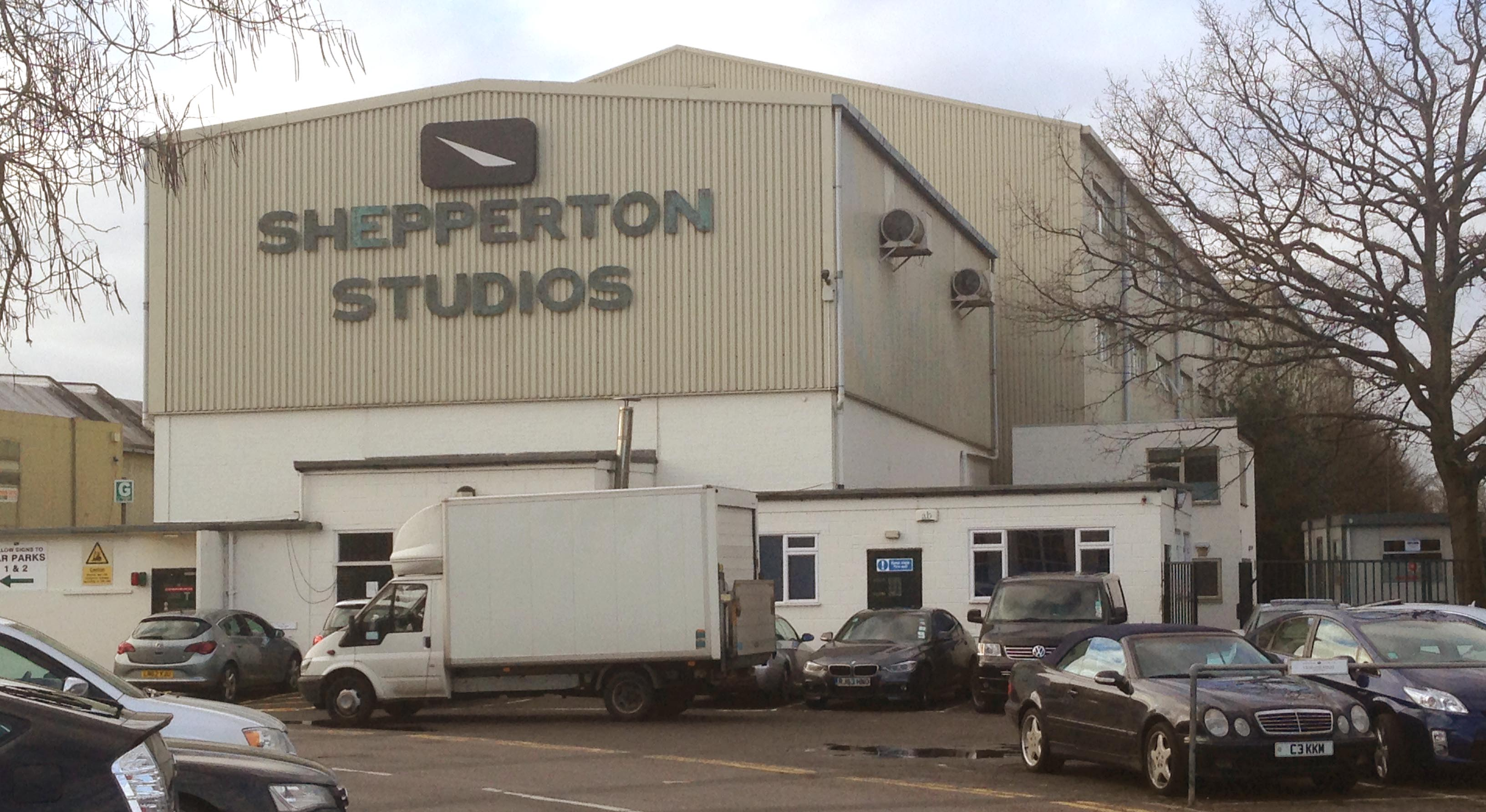
Shepperton Studios, Surrey, where the video was shot by David Mallet in November 1983

David Mallet's music video for the song features scenes from Fritz Lang's 1927 German expressionist science fiction film Metropolis and also includes footage of the band traveling through Metropolis and singing the song in a stylized re-creation of its underground machine rooms, which is interconnected with people donning gas masks and taking shelter in their homes during wartime and of one such family passing the time in various ways that include listening to the radio. The video also features footage from earlier Queen promo videos. At the end of the music video, the words "Thanks To Metropolis" appear.

The video was filmed at Carlton TV Studios and Shepperton Studios, London, between 23–24 November 1983 and January 1984. It led to a 1984 re-release of the film with a rock soundtrack. Mercury's solo song "Love Kills" was used in Giorgio Moroder's restored version of the film, and in exchange, Queen was granted the rights to use footage from it in their "Radio Ga Ga" video. However, Queen had to buy performance rights to the film from the communist East German government, the copyright holder at the time (the film entered the public domain in 2023). At the 1984 MTV Video Music Awards, the video received a Best Art Direction nomination.

== Critical reception ==
Upon its release as a single, Phil McNeill of Number One believed that "Radio Ga Ga" would be a hit (and accurately predicted it reaching number two in the UK) as "no DJ can resist a record with 'radio' in the title" and the music video "pulls out enough expensive stops to push [it] to the top". However, in a later issue, dated 14 April, guest writer Thomas Dolby called the song "banal", and stated that "it's terrible when such a talented band spend so much time making awful records".

The Police drummer Stewart Copeland reviewed the song for Record Mirror. He wrote that Queen had adopted the current "synthesizer sound" rather than remain "true to their form". He remarked that "it's hard to know whether this is a Duran Duran clone group or a Japan clone group" and added that Mercury's singing "sounds like Bryan Ferry". Charles Shaar Murray, writing for NME, believed that the song "just sounds like a lot of old noises borrowed from newer groups".

OMD frontman Andy McCluskey praised "Radio Ga Ga" in a retrospective commentary, calling it Queen's best song and "a victory for the righteous side of electronic music".

== Live performances ==
Queen finished their sets before the encores on The Works Tour with "Radio Ga Ga" and Mercury would normally sing "you had your time" in a lower octave and modify the deliveries of "you had the power, you've yet to have your finest hour" while Roger Taylor sang the pre-chorus in the high octave. Live versions from the 1984/85 tour were recorded and filmed for the concert films Queen Rock in Rio 1985 and Final Live in Japan 1985. As heard on bootleg recordings, Deacon can be heard providing backing vocals to the song; it is one of the very few occasions he sang in concert.

"I remember thinking 'oh great, they've picked it up' and then I thought 'this is not a Queen audience'. This is a general audience who've bought tickets before they even knew we were on the bill. And they all did it. How did they know? Nobody told them to do it."

— Brian May on the audience participation in clapping to "Radio Ga Ga" at Live Aid.

Queen played a shorter, up-tempo version of "Radio Ga Ga" during the Live Aid concert on 13 July 1985 at Wembley Stadium, where Queen's "show-stealing performance" had 72,000 people clapping in unison. It was the second song the band performed at Live Aid after opening with "Bohemian Rhapsody". "Radio Ga Ga" became a live favourite thanks largely to the audience participation potential of the clapping sequence prompted by the rhythm of the chorus (copied from the video). Mercury sang all high notes in this version. The song was played for the Magic Tour a year later, including twice more at Wembley Stadium; it was recorded for the live album Live at Wembley '86, VHS Video and DVD on 12 July 1986, the second night in the venue.

Paul Young performed the song with Queen at the Freddie Mercury Tribute Concert again at Wembley Stadium on 20 April 1992. At the "Party at the Palace" concert, celebrating Queen Elizabeth II's Golden Jubilee in 2002, "Radio Ga Ga" opened up Queen's set with Roger Taylor on vocals and Phil Collins on the drums.

This song was played on the Queen + Paul Rodgers Tour in 2005–2006 and sung by Roger Taylor and Paul Rodgers. It was recorded officially at the Hallam FM Arena in Sheffield on 5 May 2005. The result, Return of the Champions, was released on CD and DVD on 19 September 2005 and 17 October 2005. It was also played on the Rock the Cosmos Tour during late 2008, this time with only Rodgers on lead vocals. The concert album Live in Ukraine resulted from this tour, yet the song is not available on the CD or DVD versions released on 15 June 2009. This "Radio Ga Ga" performance is only available as a digital download from iTunes. It was again played on the Queen + Adam Lambert Tour with Lambert on lead vocals, and again during the Rhapsody Tour of 2019–2024.

== Track listings ==
7" single

- A-side. "Radio Ga Ga" (Album Version)
- B-side. "I Go Crazy" (Single Version)

12" single

- A-side. "Radio Ga Ga" (Extended Version)
- B1. "Radio Ga Ga" (Instrumental Version)
- B2. "I Go Crazy" (Single Version)

== Personnel ==
=== Queen ===
- Freddie Mercury – lead vocals, synthesizer, sampler
- Brian May – guitars, backing vocals
- Roger Taylor – acoustic and electronic drums, Linndrum drum machine, vocoder, backing vocals, sampler, synthesizer
- John Deacon – bass guitar

=== Additional personnel ===
- Fred Mandel – synthesizer arrangement, synthesizer programming, synthesizer
- Reinhold Mack – recording engineer
- Mike Beiriger – additional recording engineer
- Eddie DeLena – additional recording engineer
- Stefan Wissnet – additional recording engineer

== Charts ==
=== Weekly charts ===
Initial chart performance for "Radio Ga Ga"
Chart (1984)	Peak position
Australia (Kent Music Report)	2
Austria (Ö3 Austria Top 40)	2
Belgium (Ultratop 50 Flanders)	1
Brazil (ABPD)	4
Canada Top Singles (RPM)	11
Denmark (Årets Singlehitliste)	1
Europe (Eurochart Hot 100)	1
Finland (Suomen virallinen lista)	1
France (IFOP)	28
Ireland (IRMA)	1
Italy (Musica e Dischi)	1
Netherlands (Dutch Top 40)	1
Netherlands (Single Top 100)	2
New Zealand (Recorded Music NZ)	4
Norway (VG-lista)	2
Paraguay (UPI)	4
Portugal (AFP)	1
South Africa (Springbok Radio)	4
Spain (AFYVE)	6
Sweden (Sverigetopplistan)	1
Switzerland (Schweizer Hitparade)	3
UK Singles (Official Charts)	2
US Dance Club Songs (Billboard)	28
US Billboard Hot 100	16
US Cash Box	14
US Mainstream Rock Airplay (Billboard)	22
Venezuela (UPI)	3
West Germany (GfK)	2

Chart performance for "Radio Ga Ga" upon release of the film Bohemian Rhapsody
Chart (2018)	Peak position
Canada (Hot Canadian Digital Songs)	25
France (SNEP)	164
Italy (FIMI)	80
Japan Hot 100 (Billboard)	37
US Hot Rock Songs (Billboard)	17

Weekly chart performance for Live Aid version of "Radio Ga Ga"
Chart (2019)	Peak position
US Hot Rock Songs (Billboard)	23

=== Year-end charts ===
1984 year-end chart performance of "Radio Ga Ga"
Chart (1984)	Position
Australia (Kent Music Report)	32
Austria (Ö3 Austria Top 40)	22
Belgium (Ultratop 50 Flanders)	34
Canada Top Singles (RPM)	78
Netherlands (Dutch Top 40)	32
Netherlands (Single Top 100)	23
Switzerland (Schweizer Hitparade)	25
UK Singles (OCC)	26
US Cash Box	100
West Germany (Official German Charts)	25

2019 year-end chart performance of "Radio Ga Ga"
Chart (2019)	Position
US Hot Rock Songs (Billboard)	55

2019 year-end chart performance of Live Aid version of "Radio Ga Ga"
Chart (2019)	Position
US Hot Rock Songs (Billboard)	53

== Certifications ==
Certifications and sales for "Radio Ga Ga"
Region	Certification	Certified units/sales
Denmark (IFPI Danmark)	Platinum	90,000^{‡}
Italy (FIMI)	Platinum	50,000^{‡}
New Zealand (RMNZ)	2× Platinum	60,000^{‡}
United Kingdom (BPI)	2× Platinum	1,200,000^{‡}
United States (RIAA)	Platinum	1,000,000^{‡}
^{‡} Sales+streaming figures based on certification alone.

== Legacy ==
Electric Six performed a cover version of "Radio Ga Ga" on their 2005 second album Señor Smoke. Brian May was reportedly a fan of their version.

American pop singer Lady Gaga credits her stage name to this song. She stated that she "adored" Queen, and that they had a hit called "Radio Ga Ga". "That's why I love the name".

In Slovenia, the song was used for the opening and ending of a radio show with the same name – a satirical show with host Sašo Hribar – from the first broadcast in 1989 until the final broadcast on 8 September 2023 before Hribar's sudden death.

In January 2023, singer Che Lingo sampled "Radio Ga Ga" for his single "My Radio". The song credits Queen and Roger Taylor as co-lead artists on the single.

== See also ==
- List of Dutch Top 40 number-one singles of 1984
- List of European number-one hits of 1984
- List of number-one singles of 1984 (Ireland)
- List of number-one singles and albums in Sweden
