= Love of My Life (Queen song) =

1975 song by Queen

Song by Queen

from the album A Night at the Opera
- Published: Queen Music Ltd.
- Released: 28 November 1975
- Recorded: 1975
- Studio: Rockfield (Rockfield, Wales)
- Genre: Soft rock
- Length: 3:39 (album version); 3:33 (Queen Forever version)
- Label: EMI; Elektra
- Songwriter: Freddie Mercury
- Producers: Queen; Roy Thomas Baker

"Love of My Life" is a song by the British rock band Queen from their 1975 album A Night at the Opera. The song is a sentimental ballad, notably featuring a harp played by Brian May.

After Queen performed the song in South America in 1981, the version from their live album Live Killers reached number 1 in the singles chart in Argentina and Brazil, and stayed in the charts in both countries for an entire year.

Mercury wrote it on the piano and guitar first, and May rearranged the song for acoustic 12-string guitar for live performances, also lowering the key by a minor third. May contributed occasional guitar phrases to the original recording and played the swooping harp glissandos by pasting together multiple takes of single chords.

== Background ==
Queen spent a month during the summer of 1975 rehearsing in a barn at what would become Ridge Farm Studio in Surrey. The group then had a three-week writing and rehearsing session in July in a rented house near Kington, Herefordshire before recording began. From August to September 1975 they began to record the song at Rockfield Studios in Monmouthshire.

== Live performances ==
One special song stole the show: "Love of My Life". The fans knew the song by heart. Their English was word-perfect. The throng was suddenly transformed into a sea of swaying flames as thousands pulled their lighters out.

— Lesley-Ann Jones on the crowds in South America responding to Mercury in singing "Love of My Life.

Introduced during the News of the World Tour in 1977, "Love of My Life" was such a concert favourite that Mercury would stop singing and would conduct the audience as they took over. It was especially well received during concerts in South America, and as a result, the band released the Live Killers version of the song as a single there.

I think it’s the moment when we first realised that they knew "Love of My Life". Not only knew it but would sing it. And not only would they sing it but would sing it with a passion that brought tears to our eyes.

— Brian May on the 1981 South American concerts.

A live performance of the song appears in Queen at Wembley from 1986 where again Mercury conducts the audience as they sing the song. After Mercury's death, Brian May has frequently dedicated the song to him in his own live performances. A notable exception is the Sheffield show which yielded the Return of the Champions CD and DVD. At that show, May announced that Mercury's mother was at the show and he dedicated the song to her instead. In the Queen + Paul Rodgers Tour, May would sing a few lines of the song, then let the audience take over for every verse, as Mercury did. When played at the Glasgow SECC in the 2008 Cosmos Rocks tour, May dedicated the song to his own mother, who had recently died.

During Rock in Rio 6 in 2015, Queen + Adam Lambert was one of the artists to celebrate the festival's 30th anniversary. "Love of My Life" had both May singing a few lines and archive footage of Mercury performing the song during the inaugural Wembley concert in 1986.

== 1979 live single release ==
"Love of My Life (Live at Festhalle Frankfurt, 2 Feb '79)"
- German single picture sleeve

Single by Queen

from the album Live Killers
- B-side: "Now I'm Here" (live at Palais des Sports de Gerland, Lyon, 17 Feb '79)
- Released: 29 June 1979
- Recorded: 2 February 1979
- Venue: Festhalle, Frankfurt
- Genre: Soft rock, Acoustic rock
- Length: 3:43
- Label: EMI
- Songwriter: Freddie Mercury

Queen singles chronology
| "Mustapha" (1979) | "Love of My Life (Live at Festhalle Frankfurt, 2 Feb '79)" (1979) | "Crazy Little Thing Called Love" (1979) |

Music video
- "Love of My Life " on YouTube

The acoustic version of the song featured on the band's 1979 album Live Killers was recorded at their concert at Festhalle, Frankfurt on 2 February of that year. A shortened version was released as a single in the UK and other territories, which did not include the spoken intros and outros from the album. The liner notes for the DVD release Greatest Video Hits 1 state that although the live audio is from Frankfurt, the accompanying music video that was edited to the track consisted of footage from a 1979 Tokyo concert. In fact, the footage was filmed before one of three Tokyo concerts the band played between 23 and 25 April. Some bits of footage from two concerts in Paris from earlier in the year are woven in. After performing the song in South America in 1981, it was this version that reached number 1 in the singles chart in Argentina and Brazil, and stayed in the charts in both nations for an entire year.

== Personnel ==
Original studio version

- Freddie Mercury – lead and backing vocals, piano
- Brian May – acoustic and electric guitars, harp
- Roger Taylor – drums, cymbals
- John Deacon – bass guitar

1979 live version

- Freddie Mercury – vocals
- Brian May – acoustic guitar

== Charts ==
| Chart (1979) | Peak position |
|---|---|
| UK Singles (Official Charts) | 63 |

| Chart (2018–19) | Peak position |
|---|---|
| Italy (FIMI) | 72 |
| Netherlands (Single Top 100) | 93 |
| Portugal (AFP) | 75 |
| US Hot Rock & Alternative Songs (Billboard) | 23 |

=== Year-end charts ===
| Chart (2018) | Position |
|---|---|
| Portugal Full Track Downloads (AFP) | 195 |

== Certifications ==
| Region | Certification | Certified units/sales |
|---|---|---|
| Brazil (Pro-Música Brasil) | 2× Platinum | 120,000^{‡} |
| Brazil | — | 100,000 |
| Denmark (IFPI Danmark) | Gold | 45,000^{‡} |
| Italy (FIMI) | Platinum | 70,000^{‡} |
| New Zealand (RMNZ) | Platinum | 30,000^{‡} |
| United Kingdom (BPI) | Platinum | 600,000^{‡} |
| United States (RIAA) | Gold | 500,000^{‡} |
^{‡} Sales+streaming figures based on certification alone.
