= Tie Your Mother Down =

Song written and composed by Brian May

- The Netherlands single picture sleeve

Single by Queen

from the album A Day at the Races
- B-side: "You and I"
- Released: 4 March 1977 (UK); 8 March 1977 (US)
- Recorded: 1976
- Genre: Hard rock; heavy metal; blues rock
- Length: 4:48 (album version); 3:45 (single version); 4:00 (air guitar version)
- Label: EMI (UK); Elektra (US)
- Songwriter: Brian May
- Producer: Queen

Queen singles chronology
"Somebody to Love" (1976)	"Tie Your Mother Down" (1977)	"Teo Torriatte (Let Us Cling Together)" (1977)

Music video
- "Tie Your Mother Down" on YouTube

"Tie Your Mother Down" is a song by the British rock band Queen, written by lead guitarist Brian May. It is the opening track and the second single from their 1976 album A Day at the Races. On its original release as a single in 1977 the song peaked at 31 in the UK Singles Chart. More than 20 years later, it was released as a double a-side to "No-One but You (Only the Good Die Young)" where it reached 13 in UK Singles Chart. On the album the song is preceded by a one-minute instrumental intro featuring a Shepard tone melody, performed by Brian May, which is reprised in the ending of "Teo Torriatte": this was intended to create a "circle" within the album.

After its release in 1976, it was played by Queen on every subsequent tour. At the 1992 The Freddie Mercury Tribute Concert, the song was co-performed by Queen and guests Joe Elliott and Slash. On several occasions in recent years, Brian May and Roger Taylor have played the song live with the Foo Fighters, including performances at Queen's Rock and Roll Hall of Fame induction ceremony in 2001, and the VH1 Rock Honors in 2006.

== History ==
Brian May started writing the song in Tenerife, while he was working for his PhD as an astrophysicist. He composed the riff on a Spanish guitar, and woke up one morning and played it while singing "tie your mother down," a line he considered a joke. Vocalist Freddie Mercury encouraged him to keep the line. "Tie Your Mother Down" opens with an ultra-heavy, stripped down guitar riff.

A promotional film was made for the song, directed by Bruce Gowers, based on a performance clip shot at Nassau Coliseum in Long Island, New York in February 1977 during the band's US arena headlining tour.

Though it was a long-time live favourite and a US FM rock radio favourite, the song had limited chart success, making #31 in the UK and #49 in the US. Therefore, it was included on the band's first Greatest Hits compilation in certain markets only; however, the song is featured on the Queen Rocks compilation album, together with some of the band's heaviest songs.

In a BBC Radio 4 tribute program to Rory Gallagher, May stated that a key inspiration for the riff of this song came from Taste's "Morning Sun" from their On the Boards (1970) album.

== Queen comments on the song ==
Well this one in fact is a track written by Brian actually, I dunno why. Maybe he was in one of his vicious moods. I think he's trying to outdo me after "Death on Two Legs" actually.

— Freddie Mercury

I'll tell you the truth, I know what happened. Sometimes you get a little riff, and you just put some words with it, and then you don't even think about what they mean. Now I'm remember thinking, now this isn't a good enough title for this song, but everyone said: 'Well actually, it sounds okay,' and so we kind of lyrically built it around that. That's the truth, folks.

— Brian May

== Reception ==
Cash Box said that it "explodes with thunder bolts of electric guitar that few other groups can equal." Record World called it "a no holds barred rocker" in which "the harmonies remain ever present."

== Charts ==
Chart (1977)	Peak position
Belgium (Ultratop 50 Flanders)	18
Belgium (Ultratop 50 Wallonia)	42
Canada Top Singles (RPM)	68
Netherlands (Dutch Top 40)	14
Netherlands (Single Top 100)	10
UK Singles (Official Charts)	31
US Billboard Hot 100	49

Chart (1998)	Peak position
UK Singles (Official Charts); Released with "No One But You"	13

== Personnel ==
- Freddie Mercury – lead and backing vocals
- Brian May – guitars, backing vocals, slide guitar, harmonium (album version only)
- Roger Taylor – drums, backing vocals, gong (album version only)
- John Deacon – bass guitar

== Live performances ==
After its release in 1976, "Tie Your Mother Down" would go on to become a concert staple for the remainder of the band's long career, as well as their most frequent opening number. At the 1992 Freddie Mercury Tribute Concert, the song was co-performed by Queen and guests; Def Leppard lead singer Joe Elliott and Guns N' Roses guitarist Slash. May sang the first verse and chorus before handing over the vocal part to Elliot. On several occasions in the recent years, May and Taylor have played this song live with the Foo Fighters, including performances at Queen's Rock and Roll Hall of Fame induction ceremony in 2001, VH1 Rock Honors 2006, and in Foo Fighters London Hyde Park concert for the encore of the show. On 5 September 2011, Jeff Beck performed the song with May and Taylor in celebration of what would have been Freddie Mercury's 65th birthday at an event titled 'Freddie for a Day' held at the Savoy Hotel in London.

== Live recordings ==
- Live Killers (1979)
- We Will Rock You/Queen Rock Montreal (1981)
- Queen on Fire – Live at the Bowl (1982)
- Live at Wembley '86/Live at Wembley Stadium (1986)
- Live Magic (1986)
- Seville Expo 92 Concert (1992)
- The Freddie Mercury Tribute Concert (1992)
- Live at the Brixton Academy (Brian May album) (1993)
- Return of the Champions (2005)
- Super Live in Japan (2005)
- Skin and Bones (Foo Fighters album/DVD, on the Hyde Park DVD) (2006)
- Live in Ukraine (2008)
