= Fat Bottomed Girls =

1978 single by Queen

- UK single picture sleeve

Single by Queen

from the album Jazz
- A-side: "Bicycle Race" (double A-side)
- Released: 13 October 1978 (UK); 24 October 1978 (US)
- Recorded: 1978
- Genre: Hard rock; blues rock; glam rock
- Length: 4:16 (album version); 3:22 (single version)
- Label: EMI (UK); Elektra (US)
- Songwriter: Brian May
- Producers: Queen; Roy Thomas Baker

Queen singles chronology
"It's Late" (1978)	"Bicycle Race" / "Fat Bottomed Girls" (1978)	"Don't Stop Me Now" (1979)

Music video
- "Fat Bottomed Girls" on YouTube

"Fat Bottomed Girls" is a song by the British rock band Queen. Written by guitarist Brian May, the song appears on the band's seventh studio album Jazz (1978) and later on their compilation album Greatest Hits. When released as a single with "Bicycle Race", the song reached number 11 in the UK Singles Chart and number 24 in the Billboard Hot 100 in the US. It is one of the band's best-known songs.

The song is formed around an open bluesy, metallic guitar tuning, and opens with its chorus. It was one of the few Queen songs played in an alternative (drop D) guitar tuning. The song's music video was filmed at the Dallas Convention Center in Texas in October 1978.

== Song and lyrical content ==
The song celebrates the narrator's attraction to curvier women. "Fat Bottomed Girls" and "Bicycle Race" were released together on a double A-sided single, and the songs refer to each other. Near the end of "Fat Bottomed Girls", Mercury shouts, "Get on your bikes and ride!" "Bicycle Race" reciprocates with the line "Fat bottomed girls, they'll be riding today".

== Reception ==
Cash Box said it has "a solid thumping beat, soaring harmonies and sonorous guitar work." Record World said that it combines "inventive lyrics and harmonies" with class.

== Live performances ==
Queen performed "Fat Bottomed Girls" in concert from 1978 to 1982. Since its release, the song has appeared in television and film, and has been covered by a number of artists.

The song was performed on the setlists of Queen + Adam Lambert's tours in 2012, 2014–2015, 2016 and 2017–2018, as well as 2023 and at the iHeartRadio Music Festival 2013 as Queen + Adam Lambert featuring Fun.

== Other versions ==
Queen's live performances of the song featured a different vocal arrangement from the studio recording. In live performances, the lead vocals during the chorus were sung by Freddie Mercury, with two harmony parts, the upper sung by Roger Taylor and the lower by Brian May. In the studio version, there is no upper harmony part; the lead vocals on the verses are sung by Mercury, while May sings the lead vocals on the chorus.

The single version (which can be found on Greatest Hits, but not the 1992 US "Red Cover" version) omits the extended guitar interludes between the verses and fades out before the ending.

== Legacy ==
During an interview with The A.V. Club, Michael McKean stated that "Fat Bottomed Girls" was an influence for the song "Big Bottom" in the 1984 mockumentary film This Is Spinal Tap.

== Personnel ==
- Freddie Mercury – lead and backing vocals
- Brian May – guitars, lead vocals on chorus, backing vocals
- Roger Taylor – drums, backing vocals
- John Deacon – bass guitar

== Live recordings ==
- Queen on Fire – Live at the Bowl
- Return of the Champions
- Super Live in Japan
- Live in Ukraine
- Bohemian Rhapsody: The Original Soundtrack

== Charts ==
=== Weekly charts ===
Chart (1978–1979)	Peak position
Austrian Singles Chart	21
British Singles Chart	11
Canada RPM Top Singles	17
Dutch Singles Chart	7
French Singles Chart	7
German Singles Chart	27
Irish Singles Chart	10
Norwegian Singles Chart	7
New Zealand	20
UK Singles (Official Charts); Double A-side with "Bicycle Race"	11
US Billboard Hot 100	24
US Cash Box Top 100	18

Chart (2018)	Peak position
US Hot Rock & Alternative Songs (Billboard)	19

=== Year-end charts ===
Chart (1979)	Position
Canada	139
US (Joel Whitburn's Pop Annual)	156

Chart (2019)	Position
US Hot Rock Songs (Billboard)	58

== Certifications ==
Certifications for "Fat Bottomed Girls"
Region	Certification	Certified units/sales
Brazil (Pro-Música Brasil)	Gold	30,000^{‡}
Italy (FIMI)	Gold	50,000^{‡}
New Zealand (RMNZ)	2× Platinum	60,000^{‡}
United Kingdom (BPI)	Platinum	600,000^{‡}
United States (RIAA)	2× Platinum	2,000,000^{‡}
^{‡} Sales+streaming figures based on certification alone.
