= Roger Taylor discography =

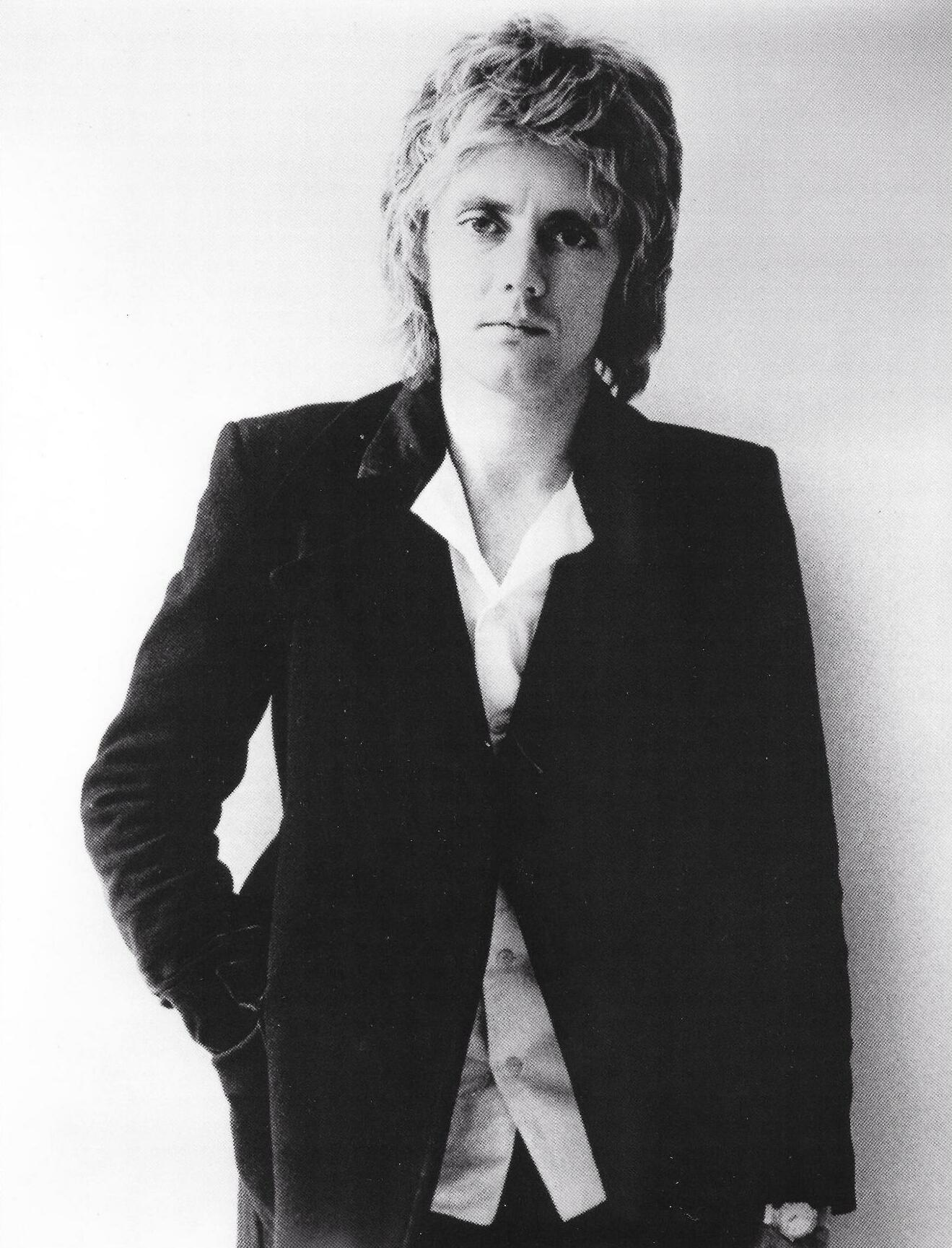
Taylor in 1977

This is the discography of British drummer Roger Taylor.

== Roger Taylor ==
=== Albums ===
- Fun in Space (1981) – No. 18 UK
- Strange Frontier (1984) – No. 30 UK
- Happiness? (1994) – No. 22 UK
- Electric Fire (1998) – No. 53 UK
- Fun on Earth (2013) – No. 69 UK
- Outsider (2021) – No. 3 UK
- Violence Insane in a Beautiful World (2026) – No. 6 UK

=== Compilations ===
- The Lot (2013)
- Roger Taylor: Best (2014)

=== Live albums ===
- The Outsider Tour Live (2022) - No. 46 UK

=== Singles ===
- 1977: "I Wanna Testify" (B-side: "Turn on the TV")
- 1981: "Future Management" – No. 49 UK
- 1981: "My Country"
- 1981: "Let's Get Crazy" (Australia, Japan, New Zealand, USA)
- 1984: "Man on Fire" – No. 66 UK, No. 11 South Africa
- 1984: "Strange Frontier" – No. 98 UK
- 1984: "Beautiful Dreams" (Portugal)
- 1994: "Nazis 1994" – No. 22 UK
- 1994: "Foreign Sand" (with Yoshiki) – No. 26 UK
- 1994: "Happiness" – No. 32 UK
- 1998: "Pressure On" – No. 45 UK
- 1999: "Surrender" – No. 38 UK
- 2009: "The Unblinking Eye (Everything Is Broken)"
- 2011: "Dear Mr. Murdoch 2011"
- 2013: "Sunny Day" (promo)
- 2017: "Journey's End"
- 2018: "Christmas in Love" (with ZoaK)
- 2019: "That's Football" (with Petr Cech)
- 2019: "Gangsters Are Running This World"
- 2020: "Isolation"
- 2021: "We're All Just Trying to Get By" (With KT Tunstall)
- 2026: "Chumps"
- 2026: "Come On Summer (It's Party Time)" (With the Ndlovu Youth Choir)

=== Video albums ===
- 1998: Live at the Cyberbarn

=== Music videos ===
- 1977: "I Wanna Testify"
- 1981: "Future Management"
- 1984: "Strange Frontier"
- 1984: "Man on Fire"
- 1994: "Nazis 1994"
- 1994: "Foreign Sand" (with Yoshiki)
- 1994: "Happiness"
- 1999: "Surrender"
- 2009: "The Unblinking Eye (Everything Is Broken)"
- 2013: "Sunny Day"
- 2018: "Journey's End"
- 2020: "Isolation"
- 2021: "We’re All Just Trying to Get By" (with KT Tunstall)

== The Cross ==
=== Albums ===
- 1988: Shove it
- 1990: Mad, Bad and Dangerous to Know
- 1991: Blue Rock

=== Compilations ===
- The Lot (2013)
- Best (2014)

=== Singles ===
- 1987: "Cowboys and Indians" - UK #74
- 1988: "Shove It" - UK #83
- 1988: "Heaven for Everyone" - UK #84
- 1988: "Manipulator"
- 1990: "Power to Love" - UK #83
- 1990: "Liar"
- 1990: "Final Destination"
- 1991: "New Dark Ages"
- 1991: "Life Changes" (Germany only, withdrawn)

=== Music videos ===
- 1987: "Cowboys and Indians"
- 1988: "Shove It"
- 1988: "Heaven for Everyone"
- 1990: "Power to Love"
- 1990: "Liar"
- 1990: "Final Destination"
- 1991: "New Dark Ages"

== Other ==
=== The Reaction ===
Year of release		Record	Songs
1966	Johnny Quale and the Reaction	Buona Sera (single)	"Buona Sera", "Just a Little Bit", "What's on Your Mind", "I'll Go Crazy"
1966	The Reaction	In the Midnight Hour (single)	"In the Midnight Hour", "I Got You (I Feel Good)"

=== Smile ===
Year of release	Record	Songs
1969	Earth/Step on Me (single, USA only)	"Earth", "Step on Me"
1982	Gettin' Smile (LP, Japan only)	"Doing Alright", "Blag", "April Lady", "Polar Bear", "Earth", "Step on Me" [all songs recorded 1969]
1997	Ghost of a Smile (CD, Netherlands only)	incl. "Earth", "Step on Me", "Doing Alright", "April Lady", "Polar Bear", "Blag" [all songs recorded 1969]

=== Larry Lurex ===
Year of release	Record	Songs	Comment
1973	I Can Hear Music (single)	"I Can Hear Music", "Goin' Back"	drums by Taylor, vocals by Freddie Mercury, guitar by Brian May

Both songs are also part of the box set Freddie Mercury - The Solo Collection (2000) and the compilation album Lover of Life, Singer of Songs - The Very Best of Freddie Mercury Solo (2006).

== Collaborations and guest appearances ==
Year of release		Song	Record	Taylor's contribution
1973	Al Stewart		Past, Present and Future (album)	drums
1975	Fox	"Survival"	Tails of Illusion (album)	backing vocals
1975	Eugene Wallace		Dangerous (album)	drums
1976	Ian Hunter	"You Nearly Did Me In"	All-American Alien Boy (album)	backing vocals by Taylor, Freddie Mercury, Brian May
1980	Hilary Hilary	"How Come You're So Dumb?", "Rich Kid Blues"	How Come You're So Dumb? (single)	songwriting, arrangement, production, guitar, drums, keyboard, bass, backing vocals
1981	Mel Smith	"Mel Smith's Greatest Hits", "Richard and Joey"	Mel Smith's Greatest Hits (single)	production, all instrumentation, backing vocals
1981	Gary Numan	"Crash", "You Are, You Are", "Moral"	Dance (album)	drums, percussion
1982	Kansas	"Right Away", "Diamonds & Pearls", "Play the Game Tonight"	Vinyl Confessions (album)	backing vocals
1982	Billy Squier	"Emotions in Motion"	Emotions in Motion (album)	backing vocals by Taylor and Freddie Mercury
1983	Brian May & Friends	"Star Fleet"	Star Fleet Project (mini album); Star Fleet (single)	backing vocals
1985	Jimmy Nail	"Love Don't Live Here Anymore"	Take It or Leave It (album); Love Don't Live Here Anymore (single)	drums, synthesizer; produced by Taylor and David Richards
1985	Camy Todorow	"Bursting at the Seams"	Bursting at the Seams (single)	drums; produced by Taylor and David Richards
1985	Elton John	"Too Young"	Ice on Fire (album)	drums (bass by John Deacon)
1985	Feargal Sharkey	"Loving You"	Loving You (7"/12" single)	additional drums and synths; produced by Taylor and David Richards
1985	Debbie Byrne	"Fools Rush In"	Persuader (album)	drums
1986	Virginia Wolf		Virginia Wolf (album)	produced by Taylor and David Richards
1986	Roger Daltrey	"Under a Raging Moon"	Under a Raging Moon (album)	drums
1986	Elton John	"Angeline"	Leather Jackets (album)	drums (bass by John Deacon)
1986	Magnum	"When the World Comes Down", "Sometime Love"	Vigilante (album)	producer; backing vocals on two tracks
1989	Sigue Sigue Sputnik	"Dancerama"		remix production
1989	Rock Aid Armenia	"Smoke on the Water"	Smoke on the Water (single)	drums (guitar by Brian May)
1989	Ian & Belinda	"Who Wants to Live Forever" (various versions)	Who Wants to Live Forever (7"/12" singles; for the British Bone Marrow Donor Appeal)	drums (production and guitar by Brian May, bass by John Deacon)
1991	Hale and Pace and the Stonkers	"The Stonk"	The Stonk (single; for Comic Relief; reached No. 1 in the UK chart)	drums (production and guitar by Brian May)
1992	Shakin' Stevens	"Radio"	The Epic Years (album)	drums
1997	SAS Band	"That's the Way God Planned It"	SAS Band (album)	drums, vocals (bass by John Deacon)
2001	Bob Geldof		Sex, Age & Death (album)	drums & background vocals
2004	Queen/David A. Stewart	"Say It's Not True"	46664 Part 1 African Prayer (album)	vocals
2003	Procol Harum	"Shadow Boxed"	The Well's on Fire (album)	backing vocals
2004	Cherie	"Say You Love Me"	Cherie (album)	drums
2010	Taylor Hawkins and the Coattail Riders	"Your Shoes"	Red Light Fever	backing vocals
2014	Band Aid 30	"Do They Know It's Christmas?"	Do They Know It's Christmas (single)	drums and keyboards
2019	Taylor Hawkins and the Coattail Riders	"Shapes of Things"	Get The Money	Backing Vocals
