= The Lot (album) =

Box set by Roger Taylor
- Released: 11 November 2013
- Genre: Rock
- Length: 641:18
- Label: Universal
- Producer: David Richards, Joshua J. Macrae, Justin Shirley-Smith, Reinhold Mack, Roger Taylor, The Cross

Roger Taylor chronology
Fun on Earth (2013)	The Lot (2013)	Roger Taylor: Best (2014)

The Lot (stylised as the lot) is a compilation box set by Queen drummer Roger Taylor, containing nearly all of his solo work outside of Queen, including material released both under his own name and with his band the Cross. The box set's release was originally scheduled for 11 October 2013, but was pushed back a month; both The Lot and Taylor's fifth solo album Fun on Earth were released on 11 November 2013.

Initial pressings featured numerous technical issues, which Taylor and his manufacturing team attempted to address by asking buyers to return affected copies in exchange for corrected copies. The album was re-released on 10 November 2014.

== Background ==
Apart from his work with Queen, Taylor recorded five solo albums, and three with the Cross. He released his first single, "(I Wanna) Testify", in 1977. He went on to record two solo albums, Fun in Space (1981) and Strange Frontier (1984). They were modestly successful when released.

In 1986, two years after the release of Strange Frontier, Taylor formed the Cross, recruiting Spike Edney, Clayton Moss, Peter Noone, and Josh Macrae. The Cross went on to record three albums: Shove It; Mad, Bad and Dangerous to Know; and Blue Rock. The band split up in 1993.

After the breakup of the Cross, Taylor released his third solo album, Happiness?. It engendered some controversy, due to the inclusion of the track "Nazis 1994". The furore likely increased sales, however. In 1998, Taylor released his fourth album, Electric Fire. He would not record another album until Fun on Earth, which was released on 11 November 2013, simultaneously with the release of The Lot.

All of Taylor's solo albums and the three albums by the Cross, as well as numerous standalone singles and alternate mixes, are included in The Lot. Discs One through Eight consist of the Taylor and Cross albums, in chronological order, while discs Nine through Twelve include alternative single edits, remixes, non-album singles, B-sides and a handful of previously unreleased rarities. Disc Thirteen is a DVD containing Taylor and the Cross' promotional music videos, along with a number of never-before-seen Taylor live performances.

Upon release, it became apparent there were several technical problems with the first pressing of the box set. These included errors in the printed lyrics, the inclusion of incorrect mixes of certain songs, and several other audio issues. Consumers who had bought the initial release were asked to return their copies to Universal Records, which would replace them with corrected copies.

Taylor assessed The Lot as a good retrospective of his career: "It's very satisfying to get it all in one place. I didn't realise how much there was: eight CDs, videos, lots of singles. I’d forgotten a lot. But it's very satisfying".

== Track listing ==
All tracks are written by Roger Taylor, except where noted.

Disc one: Fun in Space
No.	Title	Length
1.	"No Violins"	4:32
2.	"Laugh Or Cry"	3:07
3.	"Future Management"	2:58
4.	"Let's Get Crazy"	3:42
5.	"My Country I & II"	6:58
6.	"Good Times Are Now"	3:29
7.	"Magic Is Loose"	3:24
8.	"Interlude In Constantinople"	2:04
9.	"Airheads"	3:41
10.	"Fun In Space"	6:25

All tracks are written by Roger Taylor, except where noted.

Disc two: Strange Frontier
No.	Title	Length
1.	"Strange Frontier"	4:16
2.	"Beautiful Dreams"	4:24
3.	"Man on Fire"	4:05
4.	"Racing in the Street" (Bruce Springsteen)	4:27
5.	"Masters of War" (Bob Dylan)	3:49
6.	"Killing Time"	4:58
7.	"Abandonfire" (Taylor, David Richards)	4:13
8.	"Young Love"	3:23
9.	"It's an Illusion" (Taylor, Rick Parfitt)	4:02
10.	"I Cry for You (Love, Hope and Confusion)" (Taylor, Richards)	4:21

All tracks are written by Roger Taylor, except where noted.

Disc three: Shove It
No.	Title	Length
1.	"Shove It"	3:27
2.	"Cowboys and Indians"	5:54
3.	"Contact"	4:51
4.	"Heaven for Everyone"	4:54
5.	"Stand Up for Love"	4:23
6.	"Love on a Tightrope (Like an Animal)"	4:49
7.	"Love Lies Bleeding (She was a Wicked, Wily Waitress)"	4:25
8.	"Rough Justice"	3:22
9.	"The 2nd Shelf Mix"	5:48

Disc four: Mad, Bad and Dangerous to Know
No.	Title	Length
1.	"Top of the World, Ma" (Spike Edney, Josh Macrae, Clayton Moss, Peter Noone, Taylor)	3:31
2.	"Liar" (Noone)	4:28
3.	"Closer to You" (Edney)	3:12
4.	"Breakdown" (Noone)	3:53
5.	"Penetration Guru" (Moss)	3:45
6.	"Power to Love" (Macrae, Moss, Noone)	4:02
7.	"Sister Blue" (Noone)	4:15
8.	"Foxy Lady" (Jimi Hendrix)	3:27
9.	"Better Things" (Moss)	2:46
10.	"Passion for Trash" (Macrae)	2:34
11.	"Old Men (Lay Down)"	4:55
12.	"Final Destination"	3:35

Disc five: Blue Rock
No.	Title	Length
1.	"Bad Attitude" (Edney, Macrae, Moss, Noone, Taylor)	4:45
2.	"New Dark Ages"	4:57
3.	"Dirty Mind" (Edney)	3:30
4.	"Baby It's Alright" (Edney)	4:06
5.	"Ain't Put Nothin' Down" (Moss)	4:31
6.	"The Also Rans" (Edney, Macrae, Moss, Noone)	5:28
7.	"Millionaire"	3:43
8.	"Put It All Down to Love" (Edney)	3:35
9.	"Hand of Fools" (Edney, Noone)	4:34
10.	"Life Changes" (Edney, Macrae, Moss, Noone)	5:54

Disc six: Happiness?
No.	Title	Length
1.	"Nazis 1994"	2:38
2.	"Happiness"	3:26
3.	"Revelations"	3:52
4.	"Touch the Sky"	5:05
5.	"Foreign Sand" (Taylor, Yoshiki)	6:52
6.	"Freedom Train"	6:16
7.	"You Had to Be There"	2:58
8.	"The Key"	4:24
9.	"Everybody Hurts Sometime"	3:02
10.	"Loneliness..."	2:25
11.	"Dear Mr. Murdoch"	4:27
12.	"Old Friends"	3:34

Disc seven: Electric Fire
No.	Title	Length
1.	"Pressure On"	5:00
2.	"A Nation of Haircuts"	3:33
3.	"Believe in Yourself"	5:08
4.	"Surrender"	3:39
5.	"People on Streets"	4:16
6.	"No More Fun"	6:09
7.	"The Whisperers" (Nicholas Evans, Taylor)	3:28
8.	"Is It Me?"	4:22
9.	"Tonight"	3:47
10.	"Where Are You Now?"	4:51
11.	"Working Class Hero" (John Lennon)	4:43
12.	"London Town – C'mon Down"	7:02

Disc eight: Fun on Earth
No.	Title	Length
1.	"One Night Stand"	4:21
2.	"Fight Club"	3:02
3.	"Be With You" (Taylor, Rufus Taylor)	3:09
4.	"Quality Street"	4:24
5.	"I Don't Care"	3:24
6.	"Sunny Day"	3:37
7.	"Be My Gal (My Brightest Spark)"	2:44
8.	"I Am the Drummer (In a Rock N' Roll Band)"	2:46
9.	"Small"	3:50
10.	"Say It's Not True"	4:58
11.	"The Unblinking Eye [Abridged]"	4:54
12.	"Up"	3:09
13.	"Smile"	3:01
14.	"Whole House Rockin'"	3:00
15.	"Dear Mr. Murdoch (Nude Mix)"	3:16

Disc nine: Roger Taylor Solo Singles One
No.	Title	Length
1.	"I Wanna Testify"	3:47
2.	"Turn On The TV"	3:28
3.	"My Country [Single Version]"	3:52
4.	"Man On Fire [Extended Version]"	6:08
5.	"I Cry For You [Single Remix]"	4:10
6.	"Strange Frontier [Extended Remix]"	8:36
7.	"I Cry For You [Extended Remix]"	6:27
8.	"Two Sharp Pencils (Get Bad)"	3:26
9.	"Nazis 1994 [Radio Mix]"	3:27
10.	"Nazis 1994 [Kick Mix]"	4:27
11.	"Nazis 1994 [Schindlers Mix Extended]"	4:23
12.	"Nazis 1994 [Makita Mix Extended]"	3:56
13.	"Nazis 1994 [Big Science Mix]"	4:03
14.	"Foreign Sand (Single Version)"	4:35
15.	"Final Destination"	3:51
16.	"Everybody Hurts Sometimes [Live at Shepherds Bush Empire 1994]"	4:03
17.	"Old Friends [Live at Shepherds Bush Empire 1994]"	3:18

Disc ten: Roger Taylor Solo Singles 2
No.	Title	Length
1.	"Pressure On [Single Version]"	3:25
2.	"People On Streets [Mashed]"	3:33
3.	"Tonight [Dub Sangria]"	3:51
4.	"Keep A Knockin' [Man Utd CD Single]"	3:17
5.	"Surrender [Radio Mix]"	3:39
6.	"A Nation of Haircuts [Club Cut]"	3:43
7.	"London Town – C'mon Down [Single Mix]"	3:23
8.	"Surrender [Live at Cyberbarn]"	4:10
9.	"No More Fun [Live at Cyberbarn]"	4:24
10.	"Tonight [Live at Cyberbarn]"	4:22
11.	"One Night Stand"	3:53
12.	"Woman You're So Beautiful [Felix + Arty Main Mix]"	3:57
13.	"Woman You're So Beautiful [Felix + Arty Mad Mix]"	6:03
14.	"Woman You're So Beautiful [Felix + Arty Dance Hall Mix]"	5:37
15.	"The Unblinking Eye (Everything is Broken) [Single Version]"	6:13
16.	"The Unblinking Eye (Everything is Broken) [Almost Completely Nude Mix]"	6:12
17.	"Dear Mr Murdoch [2011 Version]"	3:16

Disc eleven: The Cross Solo Singles 1
No.	Title	Length
1.	"Cowboys & Indians [7" Single Edit]"	4:34
2.	"Love Lies Bleeding (She's a Wicked, Wily Waitress) [Single Remix]"	4:15
3.	"Feel the Force"	3:58
4.	"Shove It [Extended Mix]"	5:53
5.	"Shove It [Metropolix]"	3:30
6.	"Shove It [Denniz Pop Remix]"	5:04
7.	"Heaven for Everyone [7" Version] [Roger Taylor Vocal]"	5:06
8.	"Heaven for Everyone [7" Version] [Freddie Mercury Vocal]"	4:55
9.	"Manipulator [Extended Version]"	4:15
10.	"Manipulator [Single Version]"	3:58
11.	"Power to Love [Extended Version]"	5:19
12.	"Power to Love [Single Version]"	3:27
13.	"In Charge of My Heart [7" Single Version]"	2:18
14.	"Liar [12" Mix]"	6:32
15.	"In Charge of My Heart [12" Single Version]"	4:44
16.	"Liar [7" Version]"	3:18

Disc twelve: The Cross Solo Singles 2
No.	Title	Length
1.	"New Dark Ages [7" Single Version]"	3:27
2.	"Ain't Put Nothin' Down [Long Version]"	4:54
3.	"Man on Fire"	5:08
4.	"Life Changes [7" Single Version]"	3:55
5.	"Heartland"	4:47
6.	"Celebration [Jam Studios Session]"	4:38
7.	"I Can Take You Higher [Jam Studios Session]"	3:30
8.	"I Can't Get You Out of My Head [Jam Studios Session]"	3:37
9.	"Passion for Trash [Jam Studios Session]"	2:51
10.	"Top of the World Ma [Extended Remix]"	7:41
11.	"Shove It [U.S. Single Version]"	3:10

The Lot DVD
No.	Title	Length
1.	"Strange Frontier"
2.	"Man on Fire"
3.	"Happiness"
4.	"Foreign Sand"
5.	"Surrender"
6.	"Nazis 1994"
7.	"The Unblinking Eye (Everything is Broken)"
8.	"Dear Mr Murdoch"
9.	"Old Friends [Gosport Festival 1994]"
10.	"Man on Fire [Truro City Hall 1994]"
11.	"Happiness [Truro City Hall 1994]"
12.	"Everybody Hurts Sometime [Truro City Hall 1994]"
13.	"Cowboys and Indians"
14.	"Cowboys and Indians [2 Drummers]"
15.	"Shove It"
16.	"Heaven for Everyone"
17.	"Power to Love"
18.	"Liar"
19.	"New Dark Ages"
20.	"Blue Rock [EPK]"
21.	"Happiness? [EPK]"
22.	"Electric Fire [EPK]"
23.	"Interview for Parlophone"

== Personnel ==
The following personnel worked on the album:

- Roger Taylor: art conception, cover design, design, drums, executive producer, guitar, guitar feedback, instrumentation, keyboards, mixing, percussion, piano, primary artist, producer, soloist, stylophone, lead and backing vocals
- Spike Edney: composer, keyboards, mandolin, piano, backing vocals
- Clayton Moss: composer, guitar, lead and backing vocals
- Peter Noone: bass, composer, backing vocals
- Josh Macrae: drums, percussion, backing vocals, engineer, mixing, producer, programming

=== Additional musicians ===
- Keith Airey: guitar
- Gary Barnacle: saxophone (on "Cowboys and Indians", "Contact", and "Stand Up For Love")
- Steve Barnacle: bass
- Jeff Beck: guitar (on "Say It's Not True")
- Phil Chen: bass
- Jim Cregan: guitar
- Mike Crossley: keyboards, piano
- John Deacon: bass (on some tracks)
- Matthew Exelby: guitar
- Jason Falloon: bass, guitar
- Steve Hamilton: saxophone
- Kevin Jefferies: bass
- Helen Liebmann: cello
- Dick Marx: arranger, strings
- Brian May: rhythm guitar and lead guitar (on some tracks)
- Freddie Mercury: lead vocals (on "Heaven for Everyone"), backing vocals (on "Killing Time" and "Feel the Force")
- Treana Morris: lead vocals (on "Surrender")
- Jonathan Perkins: keyboards, organ, lead and backing vocals
- Catherine Porter: backing vocals
- Keith Prior: drums
- David Richards: keyboards
- Geoffrey Richardson: viola, violin
- Nicola Robins: violin
- Phil Spalding: bass
- Steve Stroud: bass
- Rufus Taylor: drums, piano
- Candy Yates: backing vocals
- Claire Yates: backing vocals
- Yoshiki: arranger, drums, piano, synthesizer (on "Foreign Sand")

=== Technical personnel ===
- Rich Breen: engineer, mixing
- John Brough: engineer
- Brad Buxer: programming
- Dean S. Crathern: assistant
- Justine Ellis: project coordinator
- Mike Ging: engineer
- Geoff Grace: programming
- Martin Groves: band coordinator
- Hiro Inoguchi: artists and repertoire
- Chris Lawson: assistant engineer
- Mack: engineer, producer
- Kevin Metcalfe: cut, mastering
- Tal Miller: assistant engineer
- David Richards: engineer, producer
- Justin Shirley-Smith: producer
- Wills Spencer: coordination, video editor
- Mike Stock: assistant engineer
- Simon Van Zwanenberg: assistant engineer
- Mark Wallis: engineer, producer
- Barry Woodward: mastering
- Yoshiki: producer (on "Foreign Sand")

=== Artistic personnel ===
- Stephen Bliss: artwork, design
- Greg Brooks: archival consultant, sleeve notes
- Simon Fowler: photography
- Bob Geldof: photography
- Richard Gray: art conception, artwork, cover design, design, photography
- George Hurrell: photography
- Mike Jackson: cover photo
- Thea Kurun: artwork
- Tim Mara: paintings
- Jim Marks: photography
- Simon Pool: design assistant
- Sarina Potgieter: photography
- Neal Preston: cover photo
- Paul Rider: photography
- Sheila Rock: photography
- Gary Taylor: archival consultant, sleeve notes
- George Taylor: photography
- Graham Temple: photo montage
- Rhys Thomas: foreword, liner notes
- Gary Wathen: design
- Ian Wright: illustrations

== Charts ==
Chart (2013)	Peak position
German Albums (Offizielle Top 100)	69
