= Happiness? (Roger Taylor album) =

Studio album by Roger Taylor
- Released: 5 September 1994
- Studio: Cosford Mill
- Genre: Rock
- Length: 48:15
- Label: Parlophone, EMI
- Producer: Roger Taylor; Josh Macrae (co-producer)

Roger Taylor chronology
Strange Frontier (1984)	Happiness? (1994)	Electric Fire (1998)

Singles from Happiness?
- 1. "Nazis 1994" Released: 25 April 1994; 2. "Foreign Sand" Released: 19 September 1994; 3. "Happiness?" Released: 14 November 1994

Professional ratings
Review scores
Source	Rating
AllMusic	2/5 stars
Music Week	3/5 stars
NME	2/10

Happiness? is the third solo album by English musician Roger Taylor, best known as the drummer for the band Queen. It was his first album outside of Queen since releasing Blue Rock with the Cross in September 1991. It reached #22 in UK album chart.

Taylor collaborated with Japanese musician Yoshiki on the song "Foreign Sand".

== Controversy ==
Although released as a single, the lyrics of the track "Nazis 1994", attacking neo-Nazism, were deemed so controversial that it was banned by UK commercial radio stations. Additionally, it was banned from being advertised and many record stores refused to stock the single. Ironically, the publicity aided in the album's success.

== Track listing ==
All songs written by Roger Taylor, except "Foreign Sand" written by Taylor and Yoshiki.

1. "Nazis 1994" – 2:35
2. "Happiness" – 3:17
3. "Revelations" – 3:44
4. "Touch the Sky" – 5:04
5. "Foreign Sand" – 6:53
6. "Freedom Train" – 6:12
7. "You Had to Be There" – 2:55
8. "The Key" – 4:25
9. "Everybody Hurts Sometimes" – 2:52
10. "Loneliness..." – 2:25
11. "Dear Mr. Murdoch" – 4:19
12. "Old Friends" – 3:33

== Personnel ==
All tracks except Foreign Sand:

- Roger Taylor: Drums, Vocals and Guitars
- Jason Falloon: Guitars (1-4, 6-12)
- Phil Spalding: Bass (3, 8, 12)
- Mike Crossley: Piano and keyboards (2, 4, 6, 8, 11-12)
- Catherine Porter: Backing Vocals (9, 12)
- Josh Macrae: Programming

Foreign Sand:

- Yoshiki: Arrangement, Drums, Piano and Synthesizer.
- Roger Taylor: Vocals
- Jim Cregan: Guitars
- Phil Chen: Bass
- Dick Marx: Strings Arrangement
- Brad Buxer and Geoff Grace: Programming
- Mastered by Chris Blair at Abbey Road
- Album Design by Roger Taylor and Richard Gray

== Singles ==
"Nazis 1994" - (UK No. 22)

"Foreign Sand"- (UK No. 26) (Japan No. 13)

"Happiness?" - (UK No. 32)

== Charts ==
Chart (1994)	Peak position
Dutch Albums (Album Top 100)	71
Scottish Albums (OCC)	47
UK Albums (OCC)	22
