= Violence Insane in a Beautiful World =

Studio album by Roger Taylor
- Released: 18 September 2026
- Length: 41:35
- Labels: Nightjar Productions; Columbia
- Producers: Joshua J. Macrae; Roger Taylor

Roger Taylor chronology
Outsider (2021)	Violence Insane in a Beautiful World (2026)

Singles from Violence Insane in a Beautiful World
- 1. "Come On Summer (It's Party Time)" Released: 10 June 2026; 2. "I See You Now" Released: 12 August 2026

Violence Insane in a Beautiful World is the seventh solo studio album from musician Roger Taylor. It was released on 18 September 2026, through Taylor's own Nightjar Productions and Columbia Records.

== Background ==
On 10 June 2026, Taylor announced the album and released the first single from the record, "Come On Summer (It's Party Time)". The single (and two other tracks on the album) feature the South African group known as the Ndlovu Youth Choir. The choir recorded a Zulu-language cover of Queen's "Bohemian Rhapsody" in 2025, which brought the attention of Taylor. He then decided to have them feature on the album.

The only song on the album not written by Taylor is a cover of John Lennon's "Jealous Guy".

== Release and tour ==
The album released on CD, vinyl, and digital on 18 September 2026. A tour to promote the album is set to start on September 21 in the United Kingdom exclusively. Touring members include Spike Edney on the keyboard and many others.

== Track listing ==
All tracks are written by Roger Taylor, except "Jealous Guy" (written by John Lennon).

No.	Title	Length
1.	"A Beautiful World" (featuring the Ndlovu Youth Choir)	4:45
2.	"Violence Insane"	3:41
3.	"What Really Matters"	3:53
4.	"Don't Photograph Food"	3:51
5.	"I See You Now"	3:16
6.	"Chump"	2:20
7.	"Spit in His Eye"	2:54
8.	"Jealous Guy"	4:09
9.	"Come On Summer (It's Party Time)" (featuring the Ndlovu Youth Choir)	6:14
10.	"A Great Big Beautiful World" (featuring the Ndlovu Youth Choir)	6:32
Total length:		41:35

== Personnel ==
Credits are adapted from Tidal.

- Roger Taylor – lead vocals, production (all tracks); drums (tracks 1–5, 7, 9, 10), piano (1, 3–7, 9, 10), keyboards (1–3, 5, 6, 8), bass guitar (1, 2, 4–7, 9, 10), percussion (1, 3, 7, 9, 10); acoustic guitar, lap steel guitar (1, 10); background vocals (2–7), electric guitar (2–5, 9)
- Joshua J. Macrae – production, engineering (all tracks); keyboards (1, 3, 5, 6, 8), electric guitar (1, 10), percussion (2, 8, 9); drums, organ (4); piano (9)
- Ndlovu Youth Choir – background vocals (1, 9, 10)
- Neil Fairclough – bass guitar (3)
- Jason Falloon – acoustic guitar (7)
- Maria-Christina Angela Hizon – piano (8)

== Charts ==
Chart performance for Violence Insane in a Beautiful World
Chart (2026)	Peak position
Australian Albums (ARIA)	100
Austrian Albums (Ö3 Austria)	18
Belgian Albums (Ultratop Flanders)	64
Belgian Albums (Ultratop Wallonia)	21
Dutch Albums (Album Top 100)	16
French Physical Albums (SNEP)	39
French Rock & Metal Albums (SNEP)	18
German Albums (Offizielle Top 100)	19
German Rock & Metal Albums (Offizielle Top 100)	8
Hungarian Physical Albums (MAHASZ)	20
Italian Physical Albums (FIMI)	12
Japanese Western Albums (Oricon)	23
Norwegian Physical Albums (IFPI Norge)	7
Scottish Albums (Official Charts)	2
Swiss Albums (Schweizer Hitparade)	23
UK Albums (Official Charts)	6
