= Queen: Budapest =

- Update image for Queen Budapest release poster

Live album by Queen
- Released: 16 February 1987
- Recorded: 27 July 1986; September 1986 (overdubs); 2012 (pitch corrections)
- Venues: Népstadion, Budapest, Hungary
- Genre: Rock
- Length: 118:47
- Label: Island
- Producers: Justin Shirley-Smith; Kris Fredrikkson; Josh Macrae; György Kovács

Queen chronology
Deep Cuts, Volume 3 (1984–1995) (2011)	Queen: Budapest (2012)	Icon (2013)

Queen: Budapest is a concert film of the performance at the Népstadion in Budapest on 27 July 1986 by the British rock band Queen. It was part of The Magic Tour, the band's final tour with their original lead singer Freddie Mercury. The 2012 release title is a play on the Hungarian Rhapsodies by Franz Liszt and one of Queen's most celebrated hits, "Bohemian Rhapsody".

The performance has been released in multiple titles including Queen – Live in Budapest (1987) and Hungarian Rhapsody: Queen Live in Budapest (2012).

== Background ==
Negotiations to perform began in 1985 when Laszlo Hegedus a local promoter, had approached Jim Beach who was Queen’s manager. The band had had success touring central and South America and therefore were interested in touring China, however they missed out to pop duo Wham! and instead looked into Eastern Europe. They performed in front of 80,000 people with tickets selling out in 24 hours with prices between 150-240 forints (£2.30-£3.60). Beach was unable to get a second concert date due to the venue being booked for a motorcycle rally and was disappointed.

Queen were one of the few bands from Western Europe to perform in the Eastern Bloc during the Cold War, and the film had a limited theatrical release in Eastern Bloc countries in 1987 and 1988 under its original title Magic – Queen in Budapest. The concert was physically released on VHS and Laserdisc in the UK and Japan on 16 February 1987 under the title Queen – Live In Budapest, and on CD, DVD and Blu-ray under the title Hungarian Rhapsody: Queen Live in Budapest for the first time on 5 November 2012 worldwide, except in the United States where it was released a day later. The Blu-ray/DVD version was restored from a 35mm interpositive; however, it was cropped from its original aspect ration (4:3) to the 1.78:1 format to accommodate 16:9 TVs.

The concert was restored in 4K Ultra HD in 2026 by a joint effort between NFI FilmLab in Budapest and Sir Peter Jackson's Park Road Post Production in New Zealand. Sony Music Vision commissioned the restoration and re-release for its 40th anniversary under the title Queen: Budapest. This time it has been restored from its original negatives stored in the NFI vaults in Budapest and its original 4:3 format has been retained. It was given a limited theatrical release in cinemas worldwide including IMAX on 7 October 2026 was followed by 2-CD, DVD, Blu-ray and 3LP vinyl releases later that year

== Physical video ==
=== VHS, Laserdisc, DVD & Blu-ray ===
No.	Title	Writer(s)	Length
1.	"One Vision"	Roger Taylor; Freddie Mercury; Brian May; John Deacon
2.	"Tie Your Mother Down"	May
3.	"In the Lap of the Gods... Revisited"	Mercury
4.	"Seven Seas of Rhye"	Mercury
5.	"Tear It Up"	May
6.	"A Kind of Magic"	Taylor
7.	"Under Pressure"	Taylor; Mercury; David Bowie; Deacon; May
8.	"Who Wants to Live Forever"	May
9.	"I Want to Break Free"	Deacon
10.	"Guitar Solo"	May
11.	"Now I'm Here"	May
12.	"Love of My Life"	Mercury
13.	"Tavaszi Szél Vizet Áraszt"	Traditional
14.	"Is This the World We Created...?"	Mercury; May
15.	"Tutti Frutti"	Richard Penniman; Dorothy LaBostrie
16.	"Bohemian Rhapsody"	Mercury
17.	"Hammer to Fall"	May
18.	"Crazy Little Thing Called Love"	Mercury
19.	"Radio Ga Ga"	Taylor
20.	"We Will Rock You"	May
21.	"Friends Will Be Friends"	Mercury; Deacon
22.	"We Are the Champions"	Mercury
23.	"God Save the Queen"	Traditional (arr. May)

=== DVD & Blu-ray Bonus ===
Bonus videos
No.	Title	Length
1.	"A Magic Year Documentary"

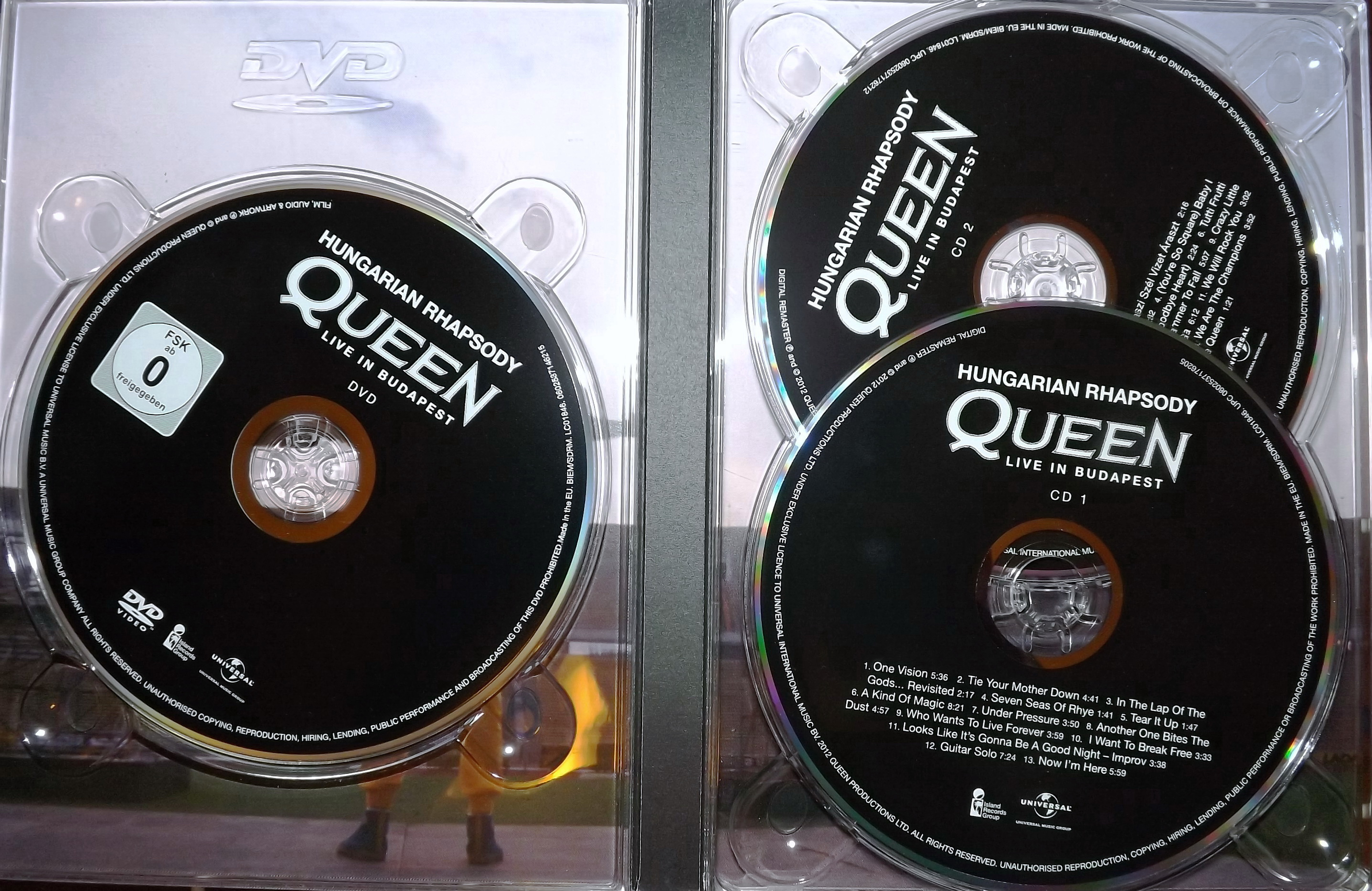
Hungarian Rhapsody DVD case

== Compact Disc ==
=== Disc one ===
No.	Title	Writer(s)	Length
1.	"One Vision"	Taylor; Mercury; May; Deacon	5:37
2.	"Tie Your Mother Down"	May	4:41
3.	"In the Lap of the Gods... Revisited"	Mercury	2:16
4.	"Seven Seas of Rhye"	Mercury	1:40
5.	"Tear It Up"	May	1:47
6.	"A Kind of Magic"	Taylor	8:21
7.	"Under Pressure"	Taylor; Mercury; David Bowie; Deacon; May	3:49
8.	"Another One Bites the Dust"	Deacon	4:56
9.	"Who Wants to Live Forever"	May	3:59
10.	"I Want to Break Free"	Deacon	3:33
11.	"Looks Like It's Gonna Be a Good Night" (Improv)	Mercury; May; Taylor; Deacon	3:38
12.	"Guitar Solo"	May	7:23
13.	"Now I'm Here"	May	6:00

=== Disc two ===
No.	Title	Writer(s)	Length
1.	"Love of My Life"	Mercury	4:37
2.	"Tavaszi Szél Vizet Áraszt"	Traditional	2:15
3.	"Is This the World We Created...?"	Mercury; May	2:31
4.	"(You're So Square) Baby I Don't Care"	Jerry Leiber; Mike Stoller	1:28
5.	"Hello Mary Lou"	Gene Pitney; Cayet Mangiaracina	2:23
6.	"Tutti Frutti"	Richard Penniman; Dorothy LaBostrie	3:35
7.	"Bohemian Rhapsody"	Mercury	5:30
8.	"Hammer to Fall"	May	5:06
9.	"Crazy Little Thing Called Love"	Mercury	4:52
10.	"Radio Ga Ga"	Taylor	6:11
11.	"We Will Rock You"	May	3:02
12.	"Friends Will Be Friends"	Mercury; Deacon	2:01
13.	"We Are the Champions"	Mercury	3:51
14.	"God Save the Queen"	Traditional (arr. May)	1:23

== Personnel ==
Queen

- Freddie Mercury – lead vocals, piano, guitar on "Crazy Little Thing Called Love"
- Brian May – acoustic and electric guitars, keyboard on "Who Wants to Live Forever", backing vocals
- Roger Taylor – drums, tambourine, co-lead vocals on "Under Pressure", backing vocals
- John Deacon – bass guitar, backing vocals

Additional musicians

- Spike Edney – keyboards, piano, rhythm guitar on "Hammer to Fall", backing vocals

== Charts ==
=== DVD ===
Chart (2012)	Peak position
Australian Music DVDs Chart	8
Austrian Music DVDs Chart	1
Belgian Music DVDs Chart	1
Danish Music DVDs Chart	6
Dutch Music DVDs Chart	10
Italian Music DVDs Chart	5
Spanish Music DVDs Chart	7
Swedish Music DVDs Chart	8
Swiss Music DVDs Chart	10

=== Album ===
Chart (2012–2019)	Peak position
Belgian Albums (Ultratop Flanders)	196
Belgian (Wallonia) Albums Chart	90
Dutch Albums Chart	44
French Albums Chart	102
German Albums Chart	23
Hungarian Albums Chart	7
Italian Albums Chart	29

Chart (2026)	Peak position
Austrian Albums (Ö3 Austria)	1
Belgian Albums (Ultratop Flanders)	20
Belgian Albums (Ultratop Wallonia)	7
Dutch Albums (Album Top 100)	20
French Albums (SNEP)	31
French Rock & Metal Albums (SNEP)	2
German Albums (Offizielle Top 100)	2
German Rock & Metal Albums (Offizielle Top 100)	2
Hungarian Albums (MAHASZ)	1
Irish Albums (IRMA)	90
Italian Albums (FIMI)	28
Japanese Albums (Oricon)	57
Polish Albums (ZPAV)	14
Portuguese Albums (AFP)	194
Scottish Albums (Official Charts)	8
Swiss Albums (Schweizer Hitparade)	3
UK Albums (Official Charts)	21

== Certifications ==
Region	Certification	Certified units/sales
Hungary (MAHASZ)	Gold	3,000^{^}
Poland (ZPAV)	Platinum	10,000^{*}
^{*} Sales figures based on certification alone.^{^} Shipments figures based on certification alone.
