= Fun on Earth =

Studio album by Roger Taylor
- Released: 11 November 2013
- Recorded: 2008–2013 at The Priory, Surrey, England
- Genre: Rock
- Length: 47:27
- Language: English
- Labels: Virgin EMI (U.K); Hollywood (US)
- Producers: Joshua J Macrae, Roger Taylor

Roger Taylor chronology
Electric Fire (1998)	Fun on Earth (2013)	Outsider (2021)

Singles from Fun on Earth
- 1. "The Unblinking Eye (Everything Is Broken)" Released: 23 November 2009; 2. "Sunny Day" Released: 11 November 2013; 3. "Up" Released: November 2013; 4. "Be with You" Released: December 2013

Fun on Earth is the fifth studio album by the English musician Roger Taylor, best known as the drummer in British rock band Queen, released on 11 November 2013 through Virgin EMI in the United Kingdom and Hollywood Records in America. It was recorded in late 2008 and throughout 2009, after the conclusion of Queen + Paul Rodgers' Rock the Cosmos Tour, and was continued after the collaboration ended. It was the first album he had worked on since 2008's The Cosmos Rocks with Queen + Paul Rodgers, and his first solo album since 1998's Electric Fire. It reached #69 in UK album chart.

== History ==
Taylor began recording his new studio album in late 2008, a few months before the breakup of Queen + Paul Rodgers. News was first published regarding the new album on Queen's website on 17 November 2009. Regarding the release of the album's lead single, Taylor said:

"What happened to the protest song? Music is now so polished, shiny and predictable, we have forgotten to try and say something with it. I am getting old and like everyone, have the right to say something about the "state of control" we live under – powerless to do anything about it. In case you hadn't noticed. The high street is full of holes. We are fighting a pointless actively negative war which is killing our young soldiers and which we simply cannot afford. This war promotes and prolongs terrorism. This is our Vietnam. Unwinnable. Pointless. We are taxed and retaxed while the nation is not only broke but utterly bankrupt, being propped up with tax payers' money and money which is simply printed. We are spied upon by 5 million cameras. We have thousands of petty rules and regulations more than ever before – no wonder people are bewildered and confused. As a nation we own almost nothing including water, electricity, gas, airspace and major manufacturers. Personal privacy is non-existent. We are directionless. I'm pissed off – you should be too."

Taylor confirmed in an interview in 2011 that The Unblinking Eye (Everything Is Broken) would be released in 2012. The album did not appear in 2012, and Taylor later announced that it would see release in 2013, with the fans choosing which songs will appear on the album in late 2012.

Taylor stated that the album is fully recorded, mixed and mastered but the release date is set in October along with his solo collection, The Lot. In a press announcement on 11 October 2013, it was announced that both Fun On Earth and The Lot would be released on 11 November 2013.

== Track listing ==
All tracks are written by Roger Taylor, except where noted.

No.	Title	Length
1.	"One Night Stand!"	4:22
2.	"Fight Club"	3:02
3.	"Be with You" (Taylor, Rufus Taylor)	3:10
4.	"Quality Street"	4:25
5.	"I Don't Care"	3:24
6.	"Sunny Day"	3:38
7.	"Be My Gal (My Brightest Spark)"	2:45
8.	"I Am the Drummer (In a Rock n' Roll Band)"	2:47
9.	"Small"	3:51
10.	"Say It's Not True" (feat. Jeff Beck)	4:58
11.	"The Unblinking Eye" (abridged version)	4:54
12.	"Up"	3:10
13.	"Smile"	3:01

The Lot Version (bonus tracks)
No.	Title	Length
14.	"Dear Mr. Murdoch (Nude Mix)"	3:14
15.	"Whole House Rockin'"	3:00

== Personnel ==
Musicians

- Roger Taylor – vocals (tracks 1–13), drums (tracks 1, 3–5, 8, 12–13), percussion (tracks 4–6, 11–13), keyboards (tracks 6, 9, 11–13), piano (tracks 2, 4–5, 12–13), bass guitar (tracks 4–5, 11–13), guitar (tracks 1–2, 4–9, 11–13), stylophone (tracks 11–13)
- Jeff Beck – guitar (track 10)
- Spike Edney – keyboards (tracks 6, 7, 10)
- Jason Falloon – guitar (tracks 2, 5, 7–9)
- Steve Hamilton – saxophone (tracks 2, 4, 5)
- Kevin Jefferies – bass (tracks 2, 3, 6–9)
- Jonathan Perkins – organ, backing vocals (track 6)
- Nicola Robins – violin (track 6)
- Steve Stroud – bass (track 10)
- Rufus Taylor – drums (track 10), piano (track 3)

Technical personnel

- Roger Taylor – production
- Josh Macrae – production, engineering

== Charts ==
Chart (2013)	Peak position
Dutch Albums (Album Top 100)	72
Scottish Albums (Official Charts)	76
UK Albums (Official Charts)	69
