= Outsider (Roger Taylor album) =

Studio album by Roger Taylor
- Released: 1 October 2021
- Genre: Rock
- Length: 47:02
- Label: Nightjar; EMI
- Producer: Roger Taylor; Joshua J. Macrae

Roger Taylor chronology
Fun on Earth (2013)	Outsider (2021)	Violence Insane in a Beautiful World (2026)

Singles from Outsider
- 1. "Gangsters Are Running This World" Released: 8 April 2019; 2. "Isolation" Released: 22 June 2020; 3. "We're All Just Trying to Get By" Released: 27 August 2021

Professional ratings
Aggregate scores
Source	Rating
Metacritic	64/100
Review scores
Source	Rating
Clash	6/10
Classic Rock	4/5 stars

Outsider is the sixth studio album by English musician Roger Taylor, best known as the drummer of British rock band Queen, which was released on 1 October 2021. A homonymous solo tour ran from 2 October to 22 October 2021. The album was inspired by COVID-19 lockdowns.

== Content ==
Some of the tracks on the album are re-recordings of Taylor's previous tracks. "Absolutely Anything" is another version of Taylor's theme for the 2015 film of the same name, while "Foreign Sand" is presented as a new acoustic "English mix" of Taylor's 1994 single composed with Yoshiki. "Journey's End" was originally released as a single in 2017, and is presented in a "2021 mix" on the album. Taylor's 2019 single "Gangsters Are Running This World", written about Russian president Vladimir Putin and Brazilian president Jair Bolsonaro, is presented in two versions, with the "purple version" a more "aggressive" take on the track.

== Tour ==
In October 2021 Taylor embarked on a fourteen date tour across the UK. It started on the 2nd October 2021 at the O2 Academy Newcastle before wrapping up on the 22nd October 2021 at the O2 Shepherds Bush Empire London. Prior to the tour Taylor said “For some time now, we’ve all just been trying to get by. Now, it’s back to the basics, myself and some great musical pals getting back out there to play some rock. Obviously we’ll include some of the Queen classic catalogue, and some of my earlier solo work, but we’ll also be introducing them to some of the new stuff. So we hope folks are going to come on down.” Taylor also announced a live album to be released on the 30th September 2022 featuring live recordings of the Outsider tour.

== Track listing ==
Outsider track listing
No.	Title	Length
1.	"Tides"	3:39
2.	"I Know, I Know, I Know"	3:51
3.	"More Kicks (Long Day's Journey into Night... Life)"	4:56
4.	"Absolutely Anything"	5:04
5.	"Gangsters Are Running This World"	4:04
6.	"We're All Just Trying to Get By" (featuring KT Tunstall)	2:52
7.	"Gangsters Are Running This World" (purple version)	2:37
8.	"Isolation"	3:24
9.	"The Clapping Song"	2:55
10.	"Outsider"	3:41
11.	"Foreign Sand" (English mix)	3:01
12.	"Journey's End" (2021 mix)	6:58
Total length:		47:02

== Charts ==
Chart performance for Outsider
Chart (2021)	Peak position
Austrian Albums (Ö3 Austria)	46
Belgian Albums (Ultratop Flanders)	165
Belgian Albums (Ultratop Wallonia)	98
Dutch Albums (Album Top 100)	64
German Albums (Offizielle Top 100)	24
Irish Albums (IRMA)	81
Japan Hot Albums (Billboard Japan)	70
Japanese Albums (Oricon)	59
Scottish Albums (OCC)	3
Spain (PROMUSICAE)	90
Swiss Albums (Schweizer Hitparade)	30
UK Albums (OCC)	3
