= Electric Fire =

Studio album by Roger Taylor
- Released: 28 September 1998
- Recorded: Cosford Mill Studios (Surrey)
- Genre: Rock
- Length: 55:22
- Labels: EMI, Parlophone
- Producers: Josh Macrae, Roger Taylor

Roger Taylor chronology
| Happiness? (1994) | Electric Fire (1998) | Fun on Earth (2013) |

Professional ratings
Review scores
| Source | Rating |
|---|---|
| Allmusic | 4/5 stars |
| Kerrang! | 3/5 stars |

Electric Fire is the fourth solo album by Roger Taylor (of the band Queen), released in 1998. It features a cover of John Lennon's song "Working Class Hero". The album came not long before Taylor's performance at Cyber Barn in the same year. Following the gloomy album Happiness?, Electric Fire also included gloomy elements but was, on the whole, a bit more bright.

Two singles from the album, "Pressure On" and "Surrender" charted on the UK Singles Chart, peaking at number 45 and 38 respectively.

== Track listing ==
All tracks by Roger Taylor, except where noted.

1. "Pressure On" – 4:56
2. "A Nation of Haircuts" – 3:32
3. "Believe in Yourself" – 5:00
4. "Surrender" – 3:36
5. "People on Streets" – 4:11
6. "The Whisperers" (Taylor, Nicholas Evans) – 6:05
7. "Is It Me?" – 3:23
8. "No More Fun" – 4:13
9. "Tonight" – 3:44
10. "Where Are You Now?" – 4:48
11. "Working Class Hero" (John Lennon) – 4:41
12. "London Town – C'mon Down" – 7:13

== Personnel ==
- Roger Taylor – vocals, drums, percussion, keyboards, bass, guitars
- Keith Prior – drums
- Steve Barnacle – bass
- Mike Crossley – keyboards
- Jason Falloon – guitars, bass
- Keith Airey – guitars
- Matthew Exelby – guitars
- Jonathan Perkins – keyboards, vocals
- Treana Morris – vocals

== Charts ==
| Chart (1998) | Peak position |
|---|---|
| Scottish Albums (Official Charts) | 95 |
| UK Albums (Official Charts) | 53 |
| UK Rock & Metal Albums (Official Charts) | 1 |
