= Heaven for Everyone =

1988 single by the Cross

- Artwork for German release

Single by the Cross

from the album Shove It
- B-side: "Love on a Tightrope"; "Contact"
- Released: 28 March 1988
- Recorded: 1987–1988
- Genre: Rock
- Length: 5:08
- Label: Parlophone
- Songwriter: Roger Taylor
- Producers: Roger Taylor; David Richards

The Cross singles chronology
"Shove It" (1988)	"Heaven for Everyone" (1988)	"Manipulator" (1989)

Music video
- "Heaven for Everyone" on YouTube

"Heaven for Everyone" is a song written by the British rock band Queen drummer Roger Taylor. It originally appeared on his side project the Cross's album Shove It, with Freddie Mercury as a guest vocalist. It was reworked in Queen style and appeared in their fifteenth and final studio album, Made in Heaven (1995), and was released as the first single by Parlophone—four years after Mercury's death—to become a chart hit. In 1999, Queen's version was included on their compilation album Greatest Hits III.

== Background and writing ==
Some reports have Taylor writing the song in 1986 as part of Queen's A Kind of Magic album sessions, after their work on Highlander was complete. If he did, the song was not used, or was incomplete when the album was finished.

When Taylor started working on the album Shove It, he recruited Freddie Mercury to record backing vocals. Two versions were recorded, one with Mercury doing backing to Taylor's lead vocals, and another with Mercury singing lead. The backing track of each was rerecorded as well, instead of the two lead vocals being recorded over the same instrumental backing. The Taylor-vocal version is about twenty seconds longer than the Mercury-vocal version.

The Cross versions also feature a spoken word intro, as well as a spoken refrain in the middle. The refrain in the Taylor-vocal version has an extra lyric not sung in the Mercury-vocal version (though it appears in the printed lyrics). Both versions by The Cross end with a spoken, "And that. Is the end. Of this section."

The UK edition of the album Shove It featured Mercury's vocal version, while the UK single featured Taylor's vocal version. In the US, the album featured Taylor's vocal version and neither were released as a single.

The song, Taylor noted, "had some good stuff about love and dignity; the usual antiwar thing."

== Music video ==
The music video was directed by Diebel/Myers in a former gasworks (location of the London O2 Arena), filmed in early 1988. For the Cross version it involved Taylor singing the song on a beach-like setting, while elderly people walked past the band and climbed up ladders to reach heaven.

== Track listings ==
Track listings are sourced from ultimatequeen.co.uk.

UK 7-inch single

1. "Heaven for Everyone" (Roger Taylor vocals)
2. "Love on a Tightrope"

UK 12-inch single

1. "Heaven for Everyone" (Roger Taylor vocals)
2. "Love on a Tightrope"
3. "Contact"

== Personnel ==
- Roger Taylor – vocals, most instruments
- Spike Edney – keyboards, vocals
- Freddie Mercury – guest vocals and backing vocals

== Queen version ==
"Heaven for Everyone"
- Artwork for UK release

Single by Queen

from the album Made in Heaven
- B-side: "It's a Beautiful Day"
- Released: 23 October 1995
- Recorded: 1987, 1993–1995
- Genre: Rock
- Length: 5:36 (album version); 4:37 (single version)
- Label: Parlophone (Europe); Hollywood (North America)
- Songwriter: Roger Taylor
- Producer: Queen

Queen singles chronology
"These Are the Days of Our Lives" (1992)	"Heaven for Everyone" (1995)	"A Winter's Tale" (1995)

Music video
- "Heaven for Everyone" on YouTube

After Freddie Mercury's death, as Queen prepared to complete their posthumous album, Made in Heaven, this song was selected to be re-done by the band as a Queen song. The lead vocal Mercury recorded in 1987 was given a new backing track and new backing vocals. A significant difference between the Cross versions and the Queen version is that there's no spoken introduction, refrain or "end" as done by Taylor on the original. Queen's version reached number two on the UK Singles Chart while peaking at number one in Hungary and becoming a top-10 hit in several other European nations.

=== Critical reception ===
A reviewer from Music Week rated Queen's version of the song four out of five, adding, "Four years in the making, Freddie Mercury's final work has resurfaced with the long-awaited album Made in Heaven due in November, from which comes this emotional ballad with all the signs of a big hit." John Robinson from NME wrote, "Brought back to life for you by the miracles of modern financial practice, this has the air of a single whose video will comprise either slow motion footage of Sir Fred playing 'Hammer to Fall' at Live Aid, or by slow motion footage of children playing happily on the facilities — swings, possibly a roundabout — thoughtfully provided by the borough in a municipal park. There is also, however, an awful undercurrent of 'Christmas single that won't die, but will be sung by rugby footballers forever' about this, as well as an awful guitar solo from Poodle May.'" Mark Frith from Smash Hits gave it a top score of five out of five, saying, "During the last year of his life only his voice remained unaffected — and, blimey, it's good. Completed after his death this record is a fairly average song elevated into brilliance by a chorus the entire pop world would give their left arm for. Just great."

=== Music video ===
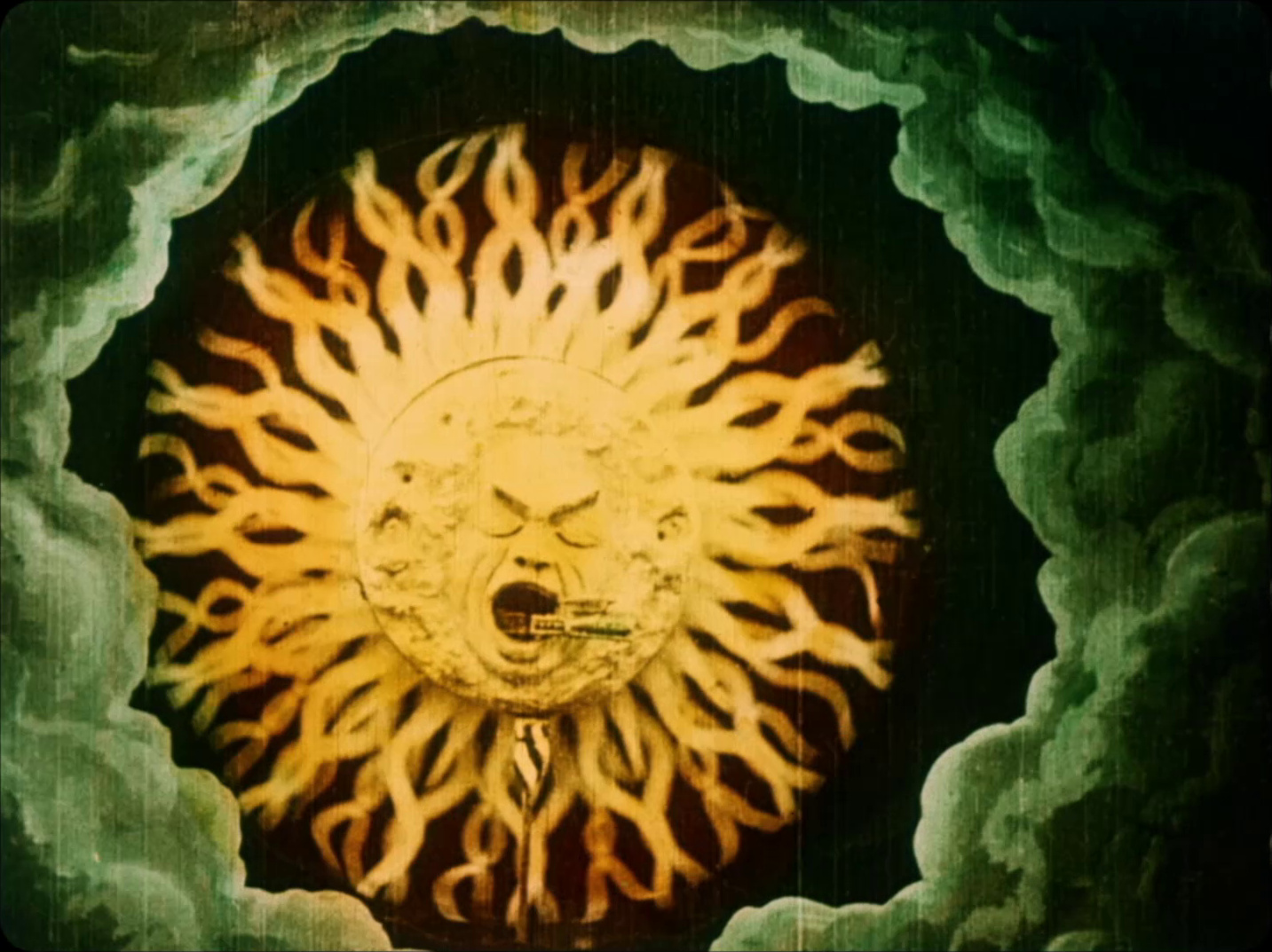
This image from the 1904 film The Impossible Voyage appears in Queen's 1995 music video for the song.

Queen's music video for the song commemorates Mercury. It was directed by British director David Mallet and released in 1995. The video opens with images of the graffiti covered walls of Mercury's home, Garden Lodge, Kensington, before showing footage from the films A Trip to the Moon (Le Voyage dans la Lune, 1902), The Impossible Voyage (Le Voyage à travers l'impossible, 1904) and The Eclipse, or the Courtship of the Sun and Moon (L'éclipse du soleil en pleine lune, 1907) by Georges Méliès.

A second music video for the song, directed by Simon Pummell was included on the Made in Heaven: The Films VHS and features Cypriot-Australian performance artist Stelarc operating a robotic "third hand" to symbolise a new era of man and machine.

=== Track listings ===
Track listings are sourced from ultimatequeen.co.uk.

UK CD 1

1. "Heaven for Everyone" (single version) – 4:37
2. "It's a Beautiful Day" (single version) – 3:57
3. "Heaven for Everyone" (album version) – 5:36

UK CD 2

1. "Heaven for Everyone" (single version) – 4:37
2. "Keep Yourself Alive" – 3:46
3. "Seven Seas of Rhye" – 2:46
4. "Killer Queen" – 2:59

UK 7-inch

A. "Heaven for Everyone" (single version) – 4:37
B. "Heaven for Everyone" (album version) – 5:36

UK cassette

1. "Heaven for Everyone" (single version) – 4:37
2. "It's a Beautiful Day" (single version) – 3:57

US CD single

1. "Heaven for Everyone" (single version) – 4:37
2. "Soul Brother" (recorded in 1981) – 3:36

=== Personnel ===
Personnel are sourced from AllMusic.

- Freddie Mercury – lead and backing vocals
- Brian May – guitars, backing vocals
- Roger Taylor – drums, keyboards, backing vocals
- John Deacon – bass guitar

=== Charts ===
==== Weekly charts ====
Chart (1995)	Peak position
Australia (ARIA)	15
Austria (Ö3 Austria Top 40)	4
Belgium (Ultratop 50 Flanders)	8
Belgium (Ultratop 50 Wallonia)	4
Brazil (UPI)	6
Europe (Eurochart Hot 100)	5
Europe (European Hit Radio)	1
Finland (Suomen virallinen lista)	5
France (SNEP)	8
Germany (GfK)	15
Hungary (Mahasz)	1
Iceland (Íslenski Listinn Topp 40)	3
Ireland (IRMA)	7
Israel (Israeli Singles Chart)	5
Italy (Musica e dischi)	4
Italy Airplay (Music & Media)	3
Netherlands (Dutch Top 40)	3
Netherlands (Single Top 100)	2
New Zealand (Recorded Music NZ)	25
Norway (VG-lista)	18
Scottish Singles Sales (Official Charts)	2
Sweden (Sverigetopplistan)	29
Switzerland (Schweizer Hitparade)	9
UK Singles (Official Charts)	2

==== Year-end charts ====
Chart (1995)	Position
Australia (ARIA)	100
Belgium (Ultratop 50 Flanders)	69
Belgium (Ultratop 50 Wallonia)	52
Europe (Eurochart Hot 100)	43
France (SNEP)	67
Iceland (Íslenski Listinn Topp 40)	36
Netherlands (Dutch Top 40)	73
Netherlands (Single Top 100)	32
UK Singles (OCC)	41

=== Certifications ===
Region	Certification	Certified units/sales
France (SNEP)	Gold	250,000^{*}
United Kingdom (BPI)	Silver	200,000^{^}
^{*} Sales figures based on certification alone.^{^} Shipments figures based on certification alone.

=== Release history ===
Region	Date	Format(s)	Label(s)	Ref.
United Kingdom	23 October 1995	CD; cassette	Parlophone	
Japan	13 December 1995	CD	EMI	
