= Shove It =

Shove it

Studio album by the Cross
- Released: 13 April 1988
- Recorded: August–December 1987 at Mountain Studios (Montreux), Townhouse, Air, Manor, Maison Rouge (England) and Mediterraneo (Ibiza)
- Genre: Rock
- Length: 41:57
- Label: Virgin
- Producer: Roger Taylor, David Richards, John "Teddy Bear" Brough

The Cross chronology
Shove it (1988)	Mad, Bad and Dangerous to Know (1990)

Singles from Shove It
- 1. "Cowboys and Indians" Released: 21 September 1987; 2. "Shove It" Released: 3 January 1988; 3. "Heaven for Everyone" Released: 28 March 1988; 4. "Manipulator" Released: 4 July 1988

Shove It is the debut album by British rock band the Cross, released on 13 April 1988 by Virgin Records. The group was founded and led by Roger Taylor, best known as the drummer for Queen, though he was the rhythm guitarist and lead vocalist for the Cross.

The album features a mix of dance and rock, and can be considered Taylor's third album after 1984's Strange Frontier.

== History ==
Taylor had originally started recording the album with the intention of releasing it as a solo artist. However, he decided to recruit a band and called them the Cross. Most of the album had been completed prior to recruiting the band members, with Taylor playing much of the instrumentation.

The album features Queen members Freddie Mercury (singing lead vocals on the English release of "Heaven for Everyone" and backing vocals on the US version), Brian May (playing lead guitar on "Love Lies Bleeding") and John Deacon (playing bass guitar on a few tracks), who collaborated with Taylor on the album.

== Reception ==
Professional ratings
Review scores
Source	Rating
AllMusic	2/5 stars

The album was poorly received by fans and critics and reached only the bottom of the charts, peaking at No. 58 on the UK Albums Chart. After two weeks, it dropped off the chart. In the US, it failed to chart at all.

== Track listing ==
All songs written by Roger Taylor.

=== UK version ===
Side 1

1. "Shove It" – 3:28
2. "Cowboys and Indians" – 5:53
3. "Contact" – 4:54
4. "Heaven for Everyone" (Freddie Mercury on lead vocals) – 4:54

Side 2

1. "Stand Up for Love" – 4:22
2. "Love on a Tightrope (Like an Animal)" - 4:49
3. "Love Lies Bleeding (She Was a Wicked, Wily Waitress)" – 4:25
4. "Rough Justice" – 3:22

CD bonus track

1. "The 2nd Shelf Mix" – 5:50
2. Hidden track - 4:58 (track ends outro of "Rough Justice", starts at 0:45)

Note: "The 2nd Shelf Mix" is an extended remix of the track "Shove It". On UK CD pressings, it also includes the hidden outro of "Rough Justice".

=== US version ===
1. "Love Lies Bleeding (She Was a Wicked, Wily Waitress)" – 4:25
2. "Shove It" – 3:28
3. "Cowboys and Indians" – 5:53
4. "Contact" – 4:54
5. "Heaven for Everyone" – 4:54 (Roger Taylor on lead vocals, Freddie Mercury on backing vocals (uncredited))
6. "Feel the Force"* – 3:44
7. "Stand Up for Love" – 4:22
8. "Love on a Tightrope (Like an Animal)"
9. "Rough Justice" – 3:22

=== Non-album track ===
1. "Manipulator" (Taylor, Edney, Steve Strange) – 3:58

== Personnel ==
- Roger Taylor - vocals, guitar, keyboards, bass, drums (most instruments on album)
- Spike Edney - keyboards, vocals
- Clayton Moss - guitar (on some tracks)
- Peter Noone - bass guitar (on some tracks)
- Josh Macrae - drums (on some tracks)

Additional personnel

- Brian May - lead guitar on "Love Lies Bleeding (She Was a Wicked, Wily Waitress)", harmonies on "Bohemian Rhapsody" sampling, and guitar on "Flash" sampling (uncredited)
- Freddie Mercury - lead vocals on "Heaven for Everyone" (UK/European version, B-side of "Heaven for Everyone" single Europe), backing vocals on "Heaven for Everyone" (US version), and harmonies for "Bohemian Rhapsody"/"Fat Bottomed Girls" sampling (uncredited)
- Gary Barnacle - tenor, alto & baritone saxophone on "Cowboys and Indians", "Contact" and "Stand Up for Love"
