= The Cross (band) =

British rock band

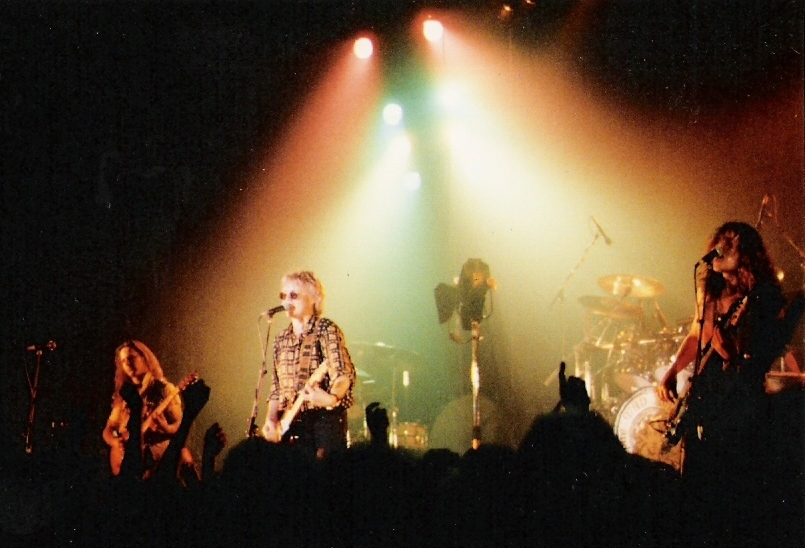
- The Cross on stage in Germany, 1990. L-R: Clayton Moss, Roger Taylor and Peter Noone.

Background information
- Origin: England
- Genres: Pop rock, dance-rock, hard rock
- Years active: 1987–1993, 2013
- Labels: Virgin, Parlophone, EMI Electrola
- Members: Roger Taylor; Clayton Moss; Peter Noone; Josh Macrae; Spike Edney
- Website: rogertaylorofficial.com

The Cross were an English rock band formed in 1987 by Queen drummer Roger Taylor.

They released three studio albums before splitting up in 1993. In contrast to Queen and other outside projects, Taylor fronted the band and played rhythm guitar instead of drums. On their debut album, which was mostly recorded by Taylor before recruiting the rest of the band, they incorporated dance influences (similar to Queen's 1982 album Hot Space) which were dropped on subsequent albums.

== History ==
Taylor formed the Cross while Queen were on break after the Magic Tour in mid 1987. He recruited Queen's tour keyboardist, Spike Edney, but advertised for the remaining musicians who were, when the band was formed, guitarist Clayton Moss, bassist Peter Noone, and drummer Josh Macrae.

The band's albums and singles were not commercially successful, although they did manage to reach the UK Albums Chart with several and they enjoyed moderate success in Germany. The first album, Shove It, was released on Virgin Records in 1987. Largely a solo project for Taylor, who had written the songs prior to forming the band, the album and the three singles it spawned did reach the charts in the UK, where it also received some positive press. The band toured in support of the album before Taylor took a short break for the 1989 Queen album The Miracle, for which there was no tour.

=== First album: Shove It ===
After Queen's 1986 Magic Tour, the band members went their separate ways to do various solo work. Taylor decided to form a new band with which he could tour. He had already written and recorded the album himself before finding a band to play the songs with. He eventually placed an advertisement for band members in a national newspaper, hinting he was a famous rock musician. The position of keyboard player was filled by Spike Edney, who had worked with Taylor on two tours with Queen. When the auditions were over, the line-up was completed by Peter Noone on bass, Clayton Moss on guitar, and Josh Macrae on drums.

The first album, Shove It, was released in 1988. Two tracks featured fellow Queen band members: the track "Heaven for Everyone" featured vocals by Freddie Mercury (backing vocals on the American version of the album, lead vocals on the European edition), while "Love Lies Bleeding (She Was A Wicked, Wily Waitress)" featured Brian May on guitar. The European CD contained an extra track (compared to cassette and LP) in The 2nd Shelf Mix, the US version having "Feel The Force" as its extra track. The band promoted hard in Germany especially, with many TV performances of singles including an appearance at the Montreux Golden Rose festival in 1988. The tour took in dates in the UK and Germany. Three singles were released from the album: "Cowboys and Indians", "Heaven for Everyone" and "Shove It". Another single, "Manipulator," was released in 1988, but it was not included on any album. It was also the only song from the time that had joint writing credits, Taylor sharing them with Spike Edney and Steve Strange.

The second single from Shove It, "Heaven for Everyone", was re-released by the remaining members of Queen, using Freddie Mercury's lead vocal take from the Shove It sessions. It was released as the lead single from the 1995 album Made in Heaven and went on to become a major hit in several countries.

=== Second album: Mad, Bad and Dangerous to Know ===
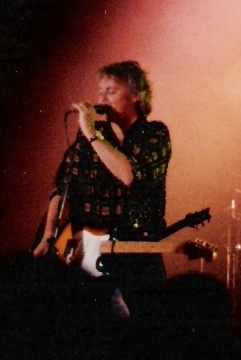
Taylor performing with The Cross in 1990.

After finishing Queen's 1989 album The Miracle, Taylor went into the studio with the rest of the Cross for the first time to record Mad, Bad and Dangerous to Know. The band composed the opening track "Top Of The World Ma". The rest of the album consisted mainly of individually written songs, except for "Power To Love" which was a joint venture by Macrae, Noone and Moss. Clayton Moss sang lead vocals on his own track "Better Things", and Spike Edney played mandolin on "Final Destination", which was written by Taylor. "Final Destination" was released as a single, as were "Liar" and "Power To Love", the latter being the last single to be released in the UK by the group. "Final Destination" came with a live rendition of Taylor's song "Man On Fire" as a B-side, and "Liar" (Noone) had a brand new track, "In Charge Of My Heart", which was also penned by Taylor. The 12" single and CD of "Liar" also included extended remixes of both "Liar" and "In Charge Of My Heart". The instrumental section at the beginning of "In Charge Of My Heart" was used as the opening to concerts on the accompanying tour. "Closer To You" (Edney) had been planned to be released in America, but the idea was never discussed again. The group having seemingly given up on the UK market, the accompanying tour only included dates in Germany, Austria, Switzerland and Ibiza. Unusual for such tours, every song from the new album was played live.

=== Third album: Blue Rock ===
Made at a time when Taylor's efforts were concentrated on Queen, Blue Rock gave the other members of the band a chance to take control of the upcoming album. It was largely written by Edney, who contributed three of his own tracks and contributed to four more. Once again, the opening track was penned by the entire band, "Bad Attitude" was written (although not complete) by the Christmas fan club party of 1990. Blue Rock was only released in Germany (although promo copies were released in Italy and Japan). "New Dark Ages" (Taylor) was released in Germany with another live version of "Man On Fire", whilst "Life Changes" was released with the B-side "Heartland". It was however immediately withdrawn, due to the death of Freddie Mercury. The tour was in support of Magnum, so the concert lengths were short (45 mins.) and very few bootlegs survived. The tour was rapid, covering 20 dates in one month.

EMI Records refused to release a third album by the band. However, as the band had enjoyed moderate success in Germany, EMI's German branch EMI Electrola still released their third effort, Blue Rock (1991), in that country.

=== Break up ===
The band broke up in 1993 after performing a final show. Taylor continued working with Queen and produced solo albums. Drummer Macrae accompanied Taylor on his solo tours and also played percussion at The Freddie Mercury Tribute Concert. Both Taylor and keyboardist Edney participated in the Queen + Paul Rodgers tours, while Macrae worked behind the scenes as a sound engineer and Pro Tools engineer for them. In the late 1990s, Edney formed the SAS Band ("Spike's All Stars"), a group with an ever-changing line-up of 1980s rock stars.

=== 2013 reunion concert ===
It was announced on Spike Edney's Facebook page on 23 July 2013 that The Cross would reunite for one night only at G Live, Guildford, on 7 December, some 20 years after their official break-up.

== Members ==
- Roger Taylor – lead vocals, rhythm guitar
- Spike Edney – keyboards, backing vocals, mandolin
- Clayton Moss – lead guitar, backing vocals (lead vocals on "Better Things")
- Peter Noone – bass guitar, backing vocals (lead vocals on "Heartland")
- Josh Macrae – drums, percussion, backing vocals

=== Touring members ===
- Suzie O'List – backing vocals
- Gillian O'Donovan – backing vocals

== Tours ==
=== Shove It: 1988 ===
Date	City	Country	Venue
19 February 1988	Leeds	England	University of Leeds
20 February 1988	Glasgow	Scotland	University of Glasgow
21 February 1988	Leicester	England	Leicester Polytechnic
23 February 1988	Sheffield	England	Sheffield Polytechnic
24 February 1988	Nottingham	England	Rock City
26 February 1988	Manchester	England	University of Manchester
27 February 1988	Bradford	England	University of Bradford
28 February 1988	Newcastle	England	The Mayfair
1 March 1988	Southampton	England	The Mayfair Suite
2 March 1988	Cardiff	Wales	Cardiff University
4 March 1988	Norwich	England	University of East Anglia
5 March 1988	Birmingham	England	The Hummingbird
6 March 1988	Leeds	England	University of Leeds
7 March 1988	Bristol	England	Bristol Studio
9 March 1988	Guildford	England	Guildford Civic
10 March 1988	London	England	The Town & Country Club
11 April 1988	Bremen	Germany	Modernes
12 April 1988	Hamburg	Germany	Markthalle Hamburg
13 April 1988	Berlin	Germany	Metropol
14 April 1988	Munich	Germany	Theaterfabrik
16 April 1988	Erlangen	Germany	E-Werk
17 April 1988	Frankfurt	Germany	Music-Hall Frankfurt
18 April 1988	Hanover	Germany	Capitol
19 April 1988	Esslingen	Germany	Club Music & Action
20 April 1988	Mannheim	Germany	Capitol
21 April 1988	Düsseldorf	Germany	Tor 3
23 April 1988	Dortmund	Germany	Westfallenhalle II
24 April 1988	Bonn	Germany	Biskuithalle

=== Mad, Bad & Dangerous To Know: 1990 ===
- 01/04/90: Festival For Life (Geneva, Switzerland)
- 21/05/90: Capitol (Hannover, Germany)
- 22/05/90: Biskuithallen (Bonn, Germany)
- 23/05/90: Blickpunktstudios (Dortmund, Germany)
- 24/05/90: Outpost (Göttingen, Germany)
- 26/05/90: Docks (Hamburg, Germany)
- 27/05/90: Max Music Hall (Kiel, Germany)
- 28/05/90: Metropol (Berlin, Germany)
- 29/05/90: De Melkweg (Amsterdam, Netherlands)
- 30/05/90: Hugennottenhalle (Neu-Isenburg, Germany)
- 01/06/90: Ku Club (Ibiza, Spain)
- 02/06/90: Ku Club (Ibiza, Spain)
- 03/06/90: Bosenbachstadion (St. Wendel, Germany)
- 04/06/90: Serenadenhof (Nuremberg, Germany)
- 05/06/90: Akantz (Tuttlingen, Germany)
- 06/06/90: Alte Feuerwache (Mannheim, Germany)
- 07/06/90: PC69 (Bielefeld, Germany)
- 08/06/90: Theaterhaus Wangen (Stuttgart, Germany)
- 15/06/90: Donauinsel (Vienna, Austria)

=== Blue Rock: 1991 ===
- 03/10/91: Tavastia Club (Helsinki, Finland)
- 05/10/91: Hagadal (Hultsfred, Sweden)
- 07/10/91: Konserthuset (Gothenburg, Sweden)
- 09/10/91: Music Hall (Hannover, Germany)
- 10/10/91: Rock Heaven (Herford, Germany)
- 11/10/91: Docks (Hamburg, Germany)
- 12/10/91: Astoria (Bremen, Germany)
- 13/10/91: Tempodrom (Berlin, Germany)
- 14/10/91: Freiheitshalle (Hof, Germany)
- 15/10/91: Circus Krone (Munich, Germany)
- 16/10/91: Stadthalle (Memmingen, Germany)
- 18/10/91: Volkshaus (Zurich, Switzerland)
- 20/10/91: Schwarzwaldhalle (Appenweiher, Germany)
- 21/10/91: Maintauberhalle (Wertheim, Germany)
- 22/10/91: Stadthalle (Offenbach, Germany)
- 23/10/91: Philipshalle (Düsseldorf, Germany)
- 24/10/91: Stadthalle (Erlengen, Germany)
- 25/10/91: Festhalle (Dietenheim, Germany)
- 26/10/91: Sporthalle Birkelbach (Erntebrück, Germany)
- 27/10/91: Forum (Ludwigsburg, Germany)

=== Christmas Crackers: 1992 ===
- 21/12/92: The Marquee (London, UK)
- 22/12/92: The Marquee (London, UK) special guests Brian May and Tim Staffell

== Discography ==
=== Studio albums ===
Year	Title	UK	DE
1988	Shove It	58	-
1990	Mad, Bad and Dangerous to Know	-	48
1991	Blue Rock	-	-

=== Singles ===
Year	Title	UK	DE	Album
1987	"Cowboys and Indians"	74	-	Shove It
1988	"Shove It"	83	-	Shove It
1988	"Heaven for Everyone"	84	68	Shove It
1988	"Manipulator"	-	-	Non-album single
1990	"Power to Love"	83	-	Mad, Bad and Dangerous to Know
1990	"Liar"	-	-	Mad, Bad and Dangerous to Know
1990	"Final Destination"	-	-	Mad, Bad and Dangerous to Know
1991	"New Dark Ages"	-	-	Blue Rock
1991	"Life Changes"			Blue Rock
