= Roger Taylor (Queen drummer) =

English musician, songwriter, and record producer (born 1949)

Roger Taylor OBE
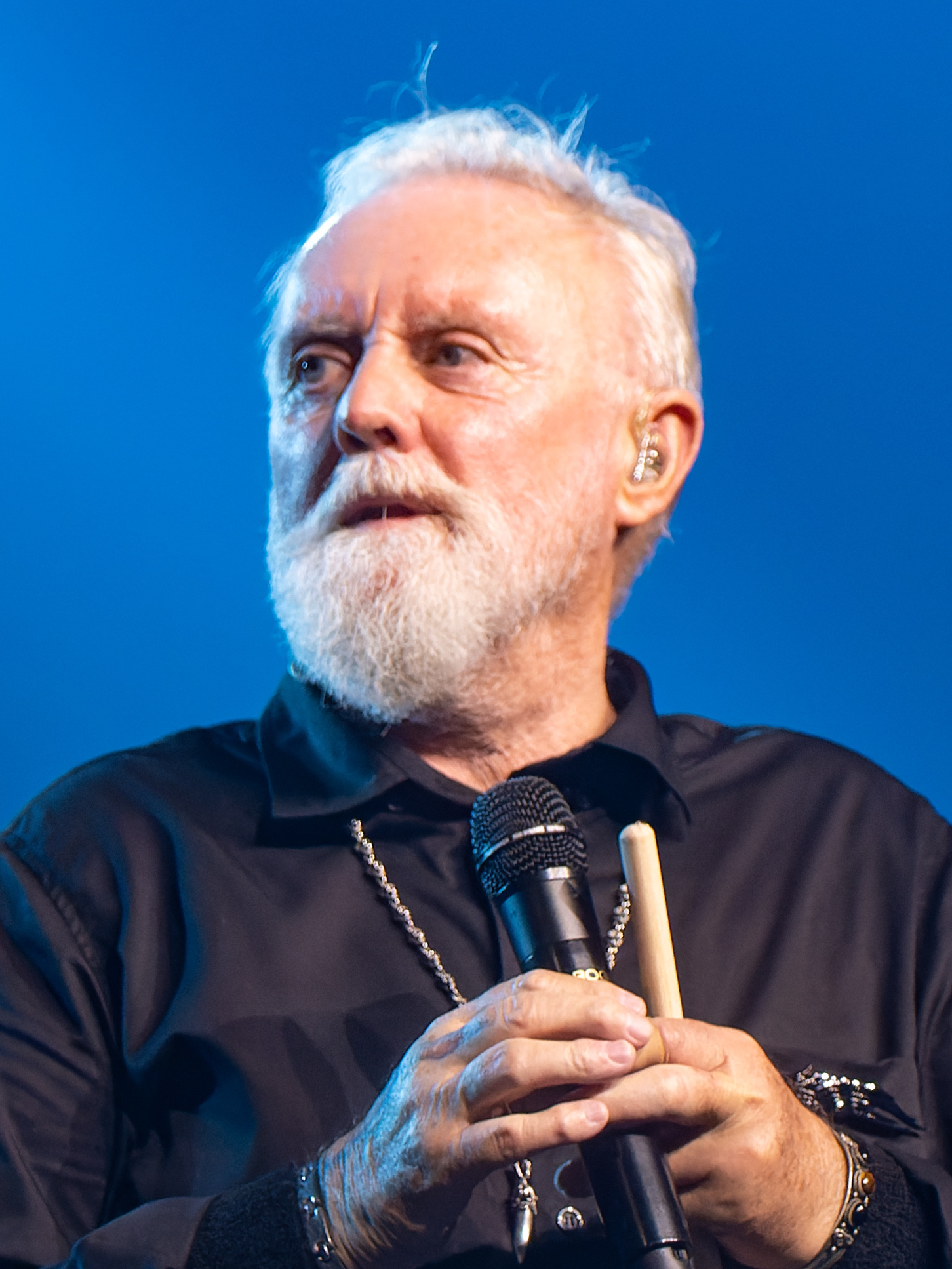
- Taylor with Queen + Adam Lambert in 2022
- Born: Roger Meddows Taylor; 26 July 1949 (age 77); King's Lynn, Norfolk, England
- Education: East London Polytechnic (BSc)
- Occupations: Musician; songwriter; singer
- Years active: 1964–present
- Spouse: Sarina Potgieter (m. 2010)
- Children: 5, including Rufus Taylor
- Musical career
- Genre: Rock
- Instruments: Drums; vocals; guitar
- Labels: EMI; Elektra; Capitol; Parlophone; Hollywood; Virgin EMI; Columbia
- Member of: Queen; Queen + Adam Lambert
- Formerly of: The Reaction; Queen + Paul Rodgers; The Cross; Smile
- Website: rogertaylorofficial.com

Roger Meddows Taylor (born 26 July 1949) is an English musician, songwriter and record producer. He achieved international fame as the drummer and backing vocalist for the rock band Queen. As a drummer, Taylor was recognised early in his career for his unique sound and was voted the eighth-greatest drummer in classic rock music history in a listener poll conducted by Planet Rock in 2005. He was inducted into the Rock and Roll Hall of Fame in 2001 as a member of Queen.

As a songwriter, Taylor composed at least one track on every Queen album, and often sang lead vocals on his own compositions. He wrote or co-wrote three UK number ones ("These Are the Days of Our Lives", "Innuendo" and "Under Pressure") and wrote a further five major hits ("Radio Ga Ga", "A Kind of Magic", "Heaven for Everyone", "Breakthru" and "The Invisible Man"). He has collaborated with such artists as Eric Clapton, Roger Waters, Roger Daltrey, Robert Plant, Phil Collins, Genesis, Jimmy Nail, Kansas, Elton John, Gary Numan, Shakin' Stevens, Foo Fighters, Al Stewart, Steve Vai, Yoshiki, Cyndi Almouzni and Bon Jovi. As a producer, he has produced albums by Virginia Wolf, Jimmy Nail and Magnum.

As a singer, Taylor possesses a countertenor vocal range. During the 1980s, in addition to his work with Queen, he formed a parallel band known as the Cross, in which he was the lead singer and rhythm guitarist. During the early 1980s, Taylor was also a panellist on the UK quiz show Pop Quiz, hosted by Mike Read. In 2014, he appeared in Brian Pern as himself.

He is the father of The Darkness' drummer Rufus Tiger Taylor.

== Early life ==
Roger Meddows Taylor was born on 26 July 1949 at West Norfolk and Lynn Hospital in King's Lynn, Norfolk. The new maternity ward was opened by Princess Elizabeth, the future queen Elizabeth II. During her visit she was introduced to 16 new mothers including Winifred Taylor, his mother. Taylor first lived at 87 High Street in King's Lynn and later moved to Beulah Street in the town. Taylor's first school was Rosebery Avenue school. Taylor moved to Truro, Cornwall, in south west England, with his mother Winifred, father Michael and younger sister Clare. When he was seven years old, he and some friends formed his first band, the Bubblingover Boys, in which he played the ukulele. He attended Bosvigo School and Truro Cathedral School; at the age of 13, he joined Truro School as a day boy.

At the age of 15, Taylor became a member of Johnny Quale and the Reactions, a semi-professional rock band made up mainly of boys from Truro School. Taylor had originally learned guitar, but became a drummer when he realised he had a more natural aptitude for it. Taylor taught himself to tune his drums, inspired by Keith Moon of the Who because of the "great drum sounds" on the early Who records. Another key influence on Taylor was Mitch Mitchell of the Jimi Hendrix Experience, who Taylor stated was his early role model.

In 1967, Taylor went to London to study dentistry at the London Hospital Medical College, but he became bored with it and switched to biology, obtaining a Bachelor of Science degree at East London Polytechnic.

== Career ==
=== 1968–1970: Smile ===
Taylor met Brian May and Tim Staffell in 1968 after a friend saw an advert for a drummer on a noticeboard at Imperial College. Smile included May on lead guitar, Staffell on lead vocals and bass, and later Taylor on drums. The band lasted for two years before Staffell departed to join Humpy Bong, leaving the band with a catalogue of nine songs.

Smile reunited for several songs on 22 December 1992. Taylor's band the Cross were headliners and he brought May and Staffell on to play "Earth" and "If I Were a Carpenter".

=== 1970s–present: Queen ===
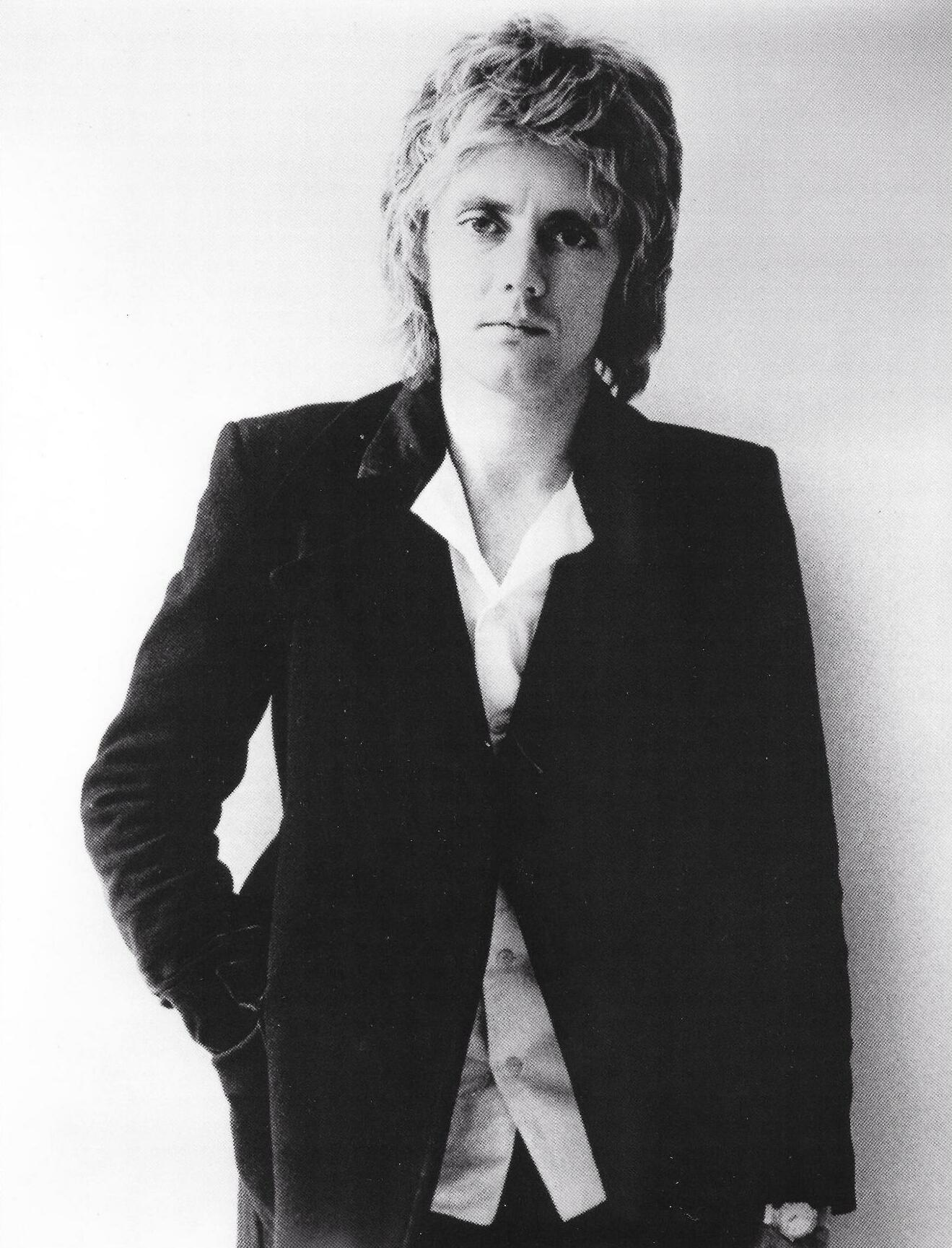
Taylor in 1977

In 1969, Taylor was working with Freddie Mercury at Kensington Market in London (they were sharing a flat at around the same time). Around 18 September 1970, Taylor and Mercury closed their market stall to honor the death of Jimi Hendrix. Mercury, then known as Farrokh "Freddie" Bulsara, was a fan of Smile. The band split up in 1970. In the same year, Taylor turned down the chance to become drummer for Genesis, which led to Phil Collins joining instead. Bulsara convinced the remaining two members of Smile to continue and he eventually joined the band, which he renamed Queen. In 1971, they recruited bassist John Deacon, before going on to release their self-titled debut album in 1973. Taylor is the third most credited songwriter for the band, usually contributing one or two tracks per album.

=== 1977–1987 ===
Taylor has had a productive solo career, releasing six albums. His first single was "(I Wanna) Testify" in 1977, recorded during Queen's sessions for the News of the World album. The A-side, although a cover of the Parliaments song of the same name, was completely different from the original. The B-side was a self-penned song "Turn on the TV".

Taylor's first solo album, released in 1981, was Fun in Space, on which he performed all vocals and played all instruments aside from about half of the keyboards, which were contributed by engineer David Richards. With Queen still touring heavily and recording at the time of release, Taylor was unable to promote the album to its fullest extent, only appearing on some European TV shows to promote the single, "Future Management", including Top of the Pops. A second single from the album was titled "My Country". The only US single released from the album was "Let's Get Crazy".

Taylor's next solo venture, Strange Frontier, came in June 1984. The three singles from the album were the title track, "Beautiful Dreams" (in Portugal only) and "Man on Fire", the latter becoming a live favourite for him in later years. No attempts to promote the singles were made since Queen was touring to promote The Works, with Taylor not even performing on any TV shows. Strange Frontier included guest appearances by bandmates Freddie Mercury, Brian May and John Deacon. Mercury sang backing vocals on "Killing Time", Deacon remixed the B-side "I Cry For You" and Rick Parfitt co-wrote and played on "It's An Illusion". David Richards, Queen's engineer and producer at the time, also co-wrote two of the tracks. The album includes covers of Bruce Springsteen's "Racing in the Street" and Bob Dylan's "Masters of War".

In 1986, Taylor co-produced Vigilante, the sixth studio album by rock band Magnum. After Queen finished their 1986 Magic Tour, Taylor started a new band, the Cross, which released three albums over their six years of existence. In 1993, the band split up, after performing one final gig at the Gosport Festival.

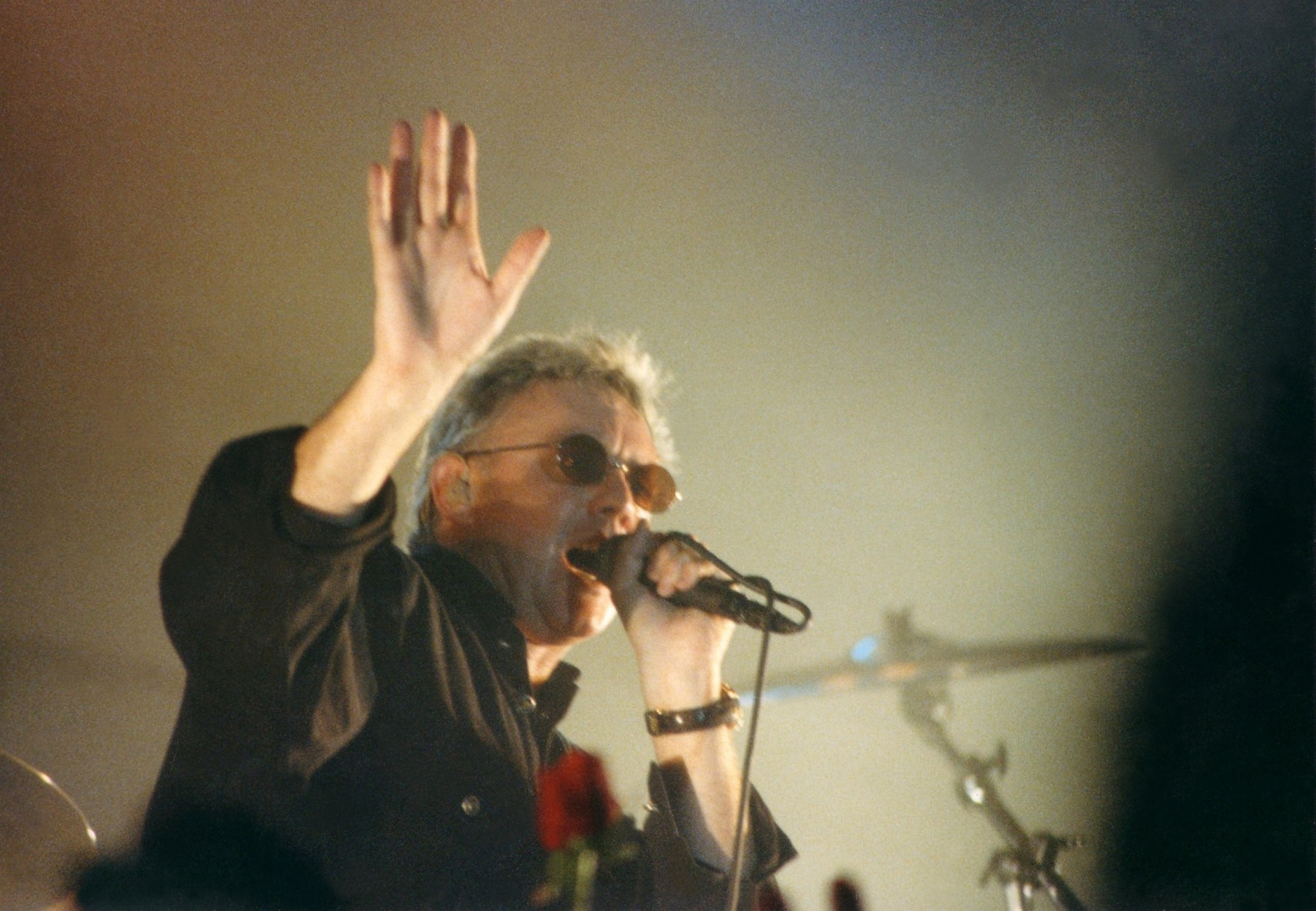
Taylor onstage in Palermo, Italy, January 1995

In 1994, Taylor worked with Yoshiki, drummer and pianist of X Japan and released the song "Foreign Sand" and a reworking of the Cross's "Final Destination". The album Happiness? was "Dedicated to the tasmanian tiger – thylacinus cynocephalus, but most especially... for Freddie". "Nazis 1994" from this album became Taylor's first hit single in England and was followed by two other top 40 UK hits, "Happiness" and "Foreign Sand".

In 1998, Taylor released his fourth solo album Electric Fire. Taylor also performed one of the first Internet-gigs – for which he got a mention in the Guinness Book of World Records. On 11 November 2013, Taylor released the album Fun on Earth, On the same day, Taylor released his compilation album The Lot, which includes all of his work outside of Queen.

=== 1987–1993: The Cross ===
The Cross were a side project of Taylor's that existed from 1987 to 1993 and released three albums. While still the drummer for Queen, Taylor fronted the Cross as rhythm guitarist and lead vocalist. On their debut release, the Cross incorporated dance influences, which they dropped on their remaining two albums.

=== 2001–2011 ===
Taylor has appeared along with May for various other events and promotions, including Queen's induction into the Rock and Roll Hall of Fame in 2001 and the "Party at the Palace" in 2002, celebrating the golden jubilee of Queen Elizabeth II. In 2004, Taylor, May, and Mike Dixon received the Helpmann Award in Australia for Best Music Direction for the musical We Will Rock You. At the Live Earth concert held at Wembley Stadium in 2007, Taylor opened the show with Taylor Hawkins of Foo Fighters and Chad Smith of Red Hot Chili Peppers.

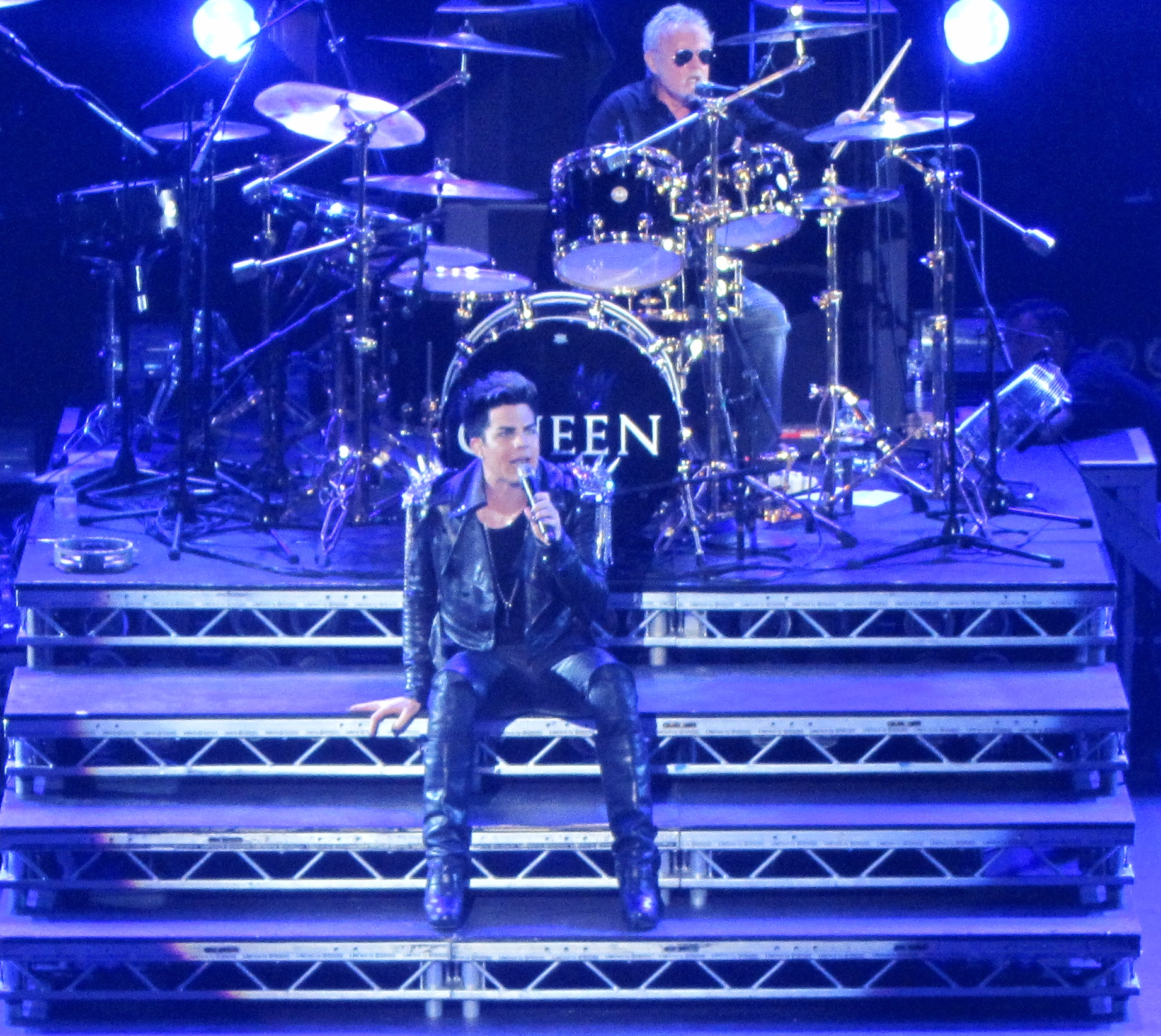
Taylor on drums with vocalist Adam Lambert in 2012

Taylor and May, performing as Queen, also appeared three times on the American singing contest television show American Idol. The first appearance was on 11 April 2006, during which that week's contestants were required to sing a Queen song. Songs performed included "Bohemian Rhapsody", "Fat Bottomed Girls", "The Show Must Go On", "Who Wants to Live Forever", and "Innuendo". The second time Queen appeared was on the show's season 8 finale in May 2009, performing "We Are the Champions" with finalists Adam Lambert and Kris Allen. The third appearance was during the eleventh season on 25 and 26 April 2012, performing a Queen medley with the six finalists on the first show. The following day, they performed "Somebody to Love" with the Queen Extravaganza band. In April 2010, Taylor appeared on the Taylor Hawkins & The Coattail Riders song "Your Shoes" for their album Red Light Fever.

In November 2009, Taylor appeared on the reality television show The X Factor with May as Queen mentoring the contestants and performing "Bohemian Rhapsody". That month Taylor confirmed he was planning to tour with Taylor Hawkins, which Taylor described as a "quick tour". At the 2011 MTV Europe Music Awards on 6 November, Queen received the Global Icon Award, and Taylor and May closed the awards ceremony, with Adam Lambert on vocals, performing "The Show Must Go On", "We Will Rock You", and "We Are the Champions". In 2011, Taylor, along with Steven Tyler and Roger Daltrey, joined the advisory board of Edge Music Network. Taylor performed in the 2012 Summer Olympics closing ceremony in London on 12 August.

=== 2013–present ===
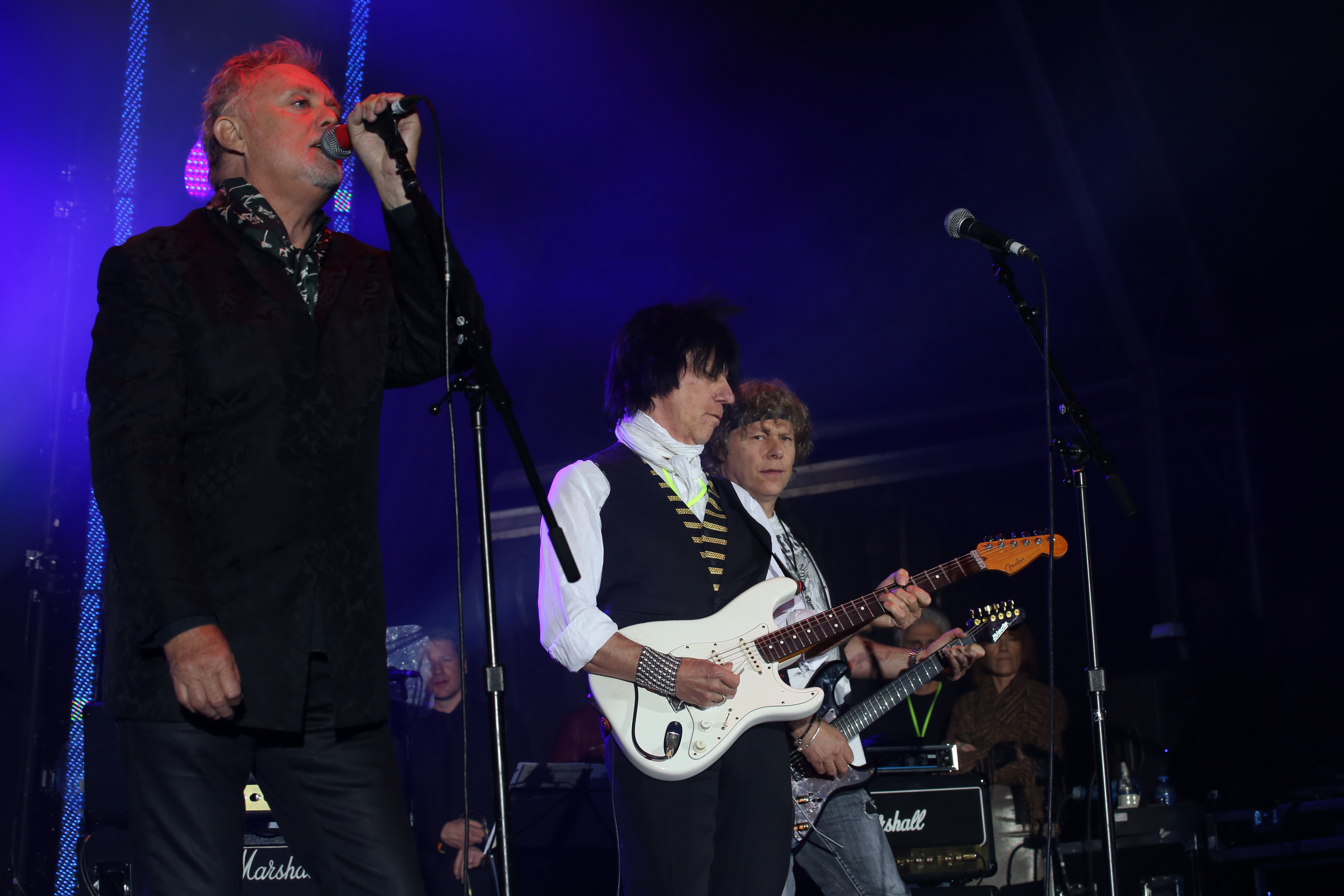
Taylor (left) in concert with Jeff Beck in May 2013

In 2013 and 2014, Taylor served as an executive producer of the film Solitary, directed by Sasha Krane. In addition to those duties, he provided original music, including the song "When We Were Young" and three instrumental songs which serve as incidental/background music in the film and during the closing credits. Taylor also appeared as a special guest for Welsh Rock artist Jayce Lewis providing drums for the track "Wrath" which were recorded at Taylor's personal studio in Surrey, the song was released as a single from the Welshman's album Nemesis. On 15 November 2014, Taylor joined the charity group Band Aid 30, playing drums alongside current British and Irish pop acts on the latest version of the track "Do They Know It's Christmas?" at Sarm West Studios in Notting Hill, London, to raise money for the 2014 Ebola crisis in Western Africa.

On 5 and 6 September 2015, Taylor, along with Led Zeppelin's John Paul Jones, joined Foo Fighters on stage in Milton Keynes to perform a cover of the Queen and David Bowie song "Under Pressure". Taylor released a new single called "Gangsters Are Running This World" on 1 April 2019, and on 8 April released a more rocking version of this song called "Gangsters Are Running This World-Purple Version". Both versions became available for streaming on 8 April 2019. On 10 May 2019 he and Czech Arsenal goalkeeper Petr Čech released a song called "That's Football" which Čech wrote for his retiring football career. In 2019, Taylor again joined Foo Fighters drummer Taylor Hawkins and his band The Coattail Riders to play on the song "Shapes of Things" from the album Get the Money.

In response to the global COVID-19 pandemic, Taylor released a new single "Isolation" on 21 June 2020. The song debuted on the top of the UK iTunes Rock chart. On 7 May 2021, Taylor announced his new solo album, Outsider, which was released on 1 October 2021, and debuted at number three on the UK Albums Chart.

In October 2021, Taylor embarked on a 14-date solo tour (Outsider Tour) in the UK, from 2 to 22 October. In January 2023, Queen single "Radio Ga Ga" was sampled on singer Che Lingo's single "My Radio"; Taylor and Queen were credited as co-lead artists on the song. In November 2023, Taylor's bar The Wild, a collaboration with his wife Sarina Taylor, Adam Lambert, Bryan Patrick Franklin, and Michael Solis, opened in West Hollywood, California.

On 13 September 2025 Taylor performed, alongside Brian May, at the Last Night of the Proms, joining the BBC Symphony Orchestra and Chorus, BBC Singers and National Youth Choir for a new orchestral arrangement of "Bohemian Rhapsody", by Stuart Morley, marking the 50th anniversary of the song.

In June 2026, Taylor released "Come On Summer (It's Party Time)" as the lead single for his solo album Violence Insane in a Beautiful World. The album released on 18 September 2026 (and debuted at #6 on the UK Album Chart) and a short tour is planned of the UK.

== Influences and favourite drummers ==
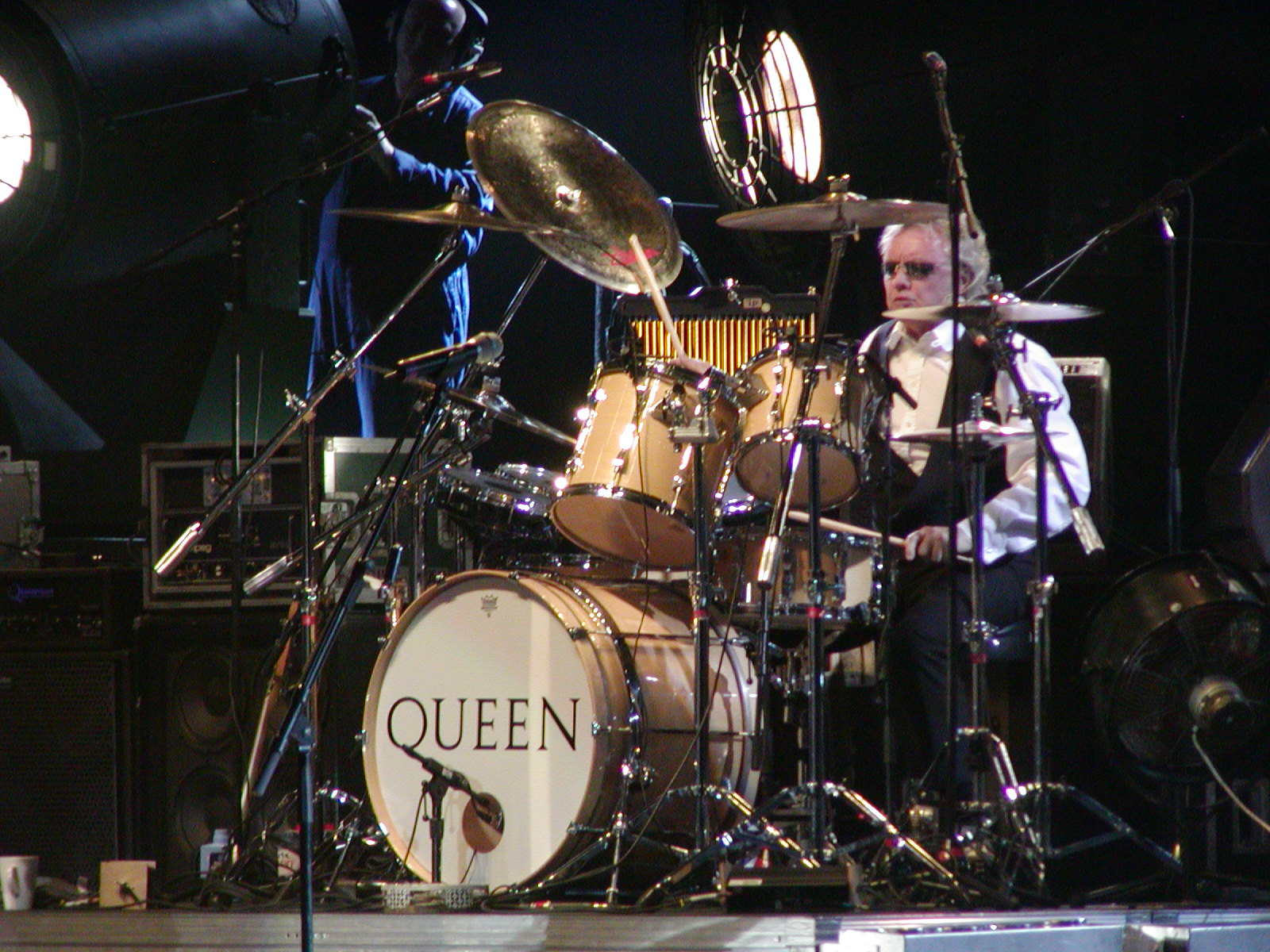
Taylor in 2005

Taylor has stated that his early role model as a drummer was Mitch Mitchell of the Jimi Hendrix Experience. He said: "I still think listening to Mitch Mitchell, especially the early stuff with Hendrix, is just fantastic. This fusion of jazz technique and wonderful riffs but with this rolling ferocious attack on the whole kit, it had lots of jazz influences I think. In fact for me he played the kit like a song, it was just wonderful. Total integration into the song. Not just marking time".

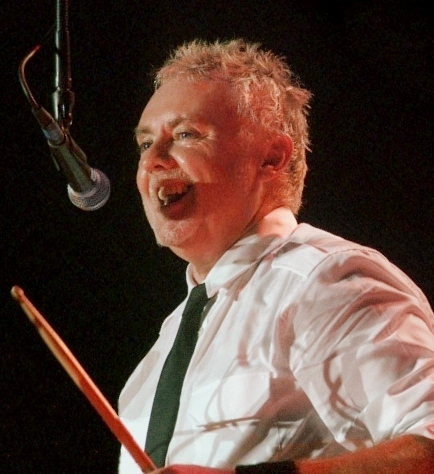
Taylor with Queen and Paul Rodgers in 2008

Taylor has also expressed great admiration for John Bonham of Led Zeppelin. Speaking of Bonham, Taylor said, "The greatest rock and roll drummer of all time was John Bonham, who did things that nobody had ever even thought possible before with the drum kit. And also the greatest sound out of his drums – they sounded enormous, and just one bass drum. So fast on it that he did more with one bass drum than most people could do with three, if they could manage them. And he had technique to burn and fantastic power and tremendous feel for rock and roll". For sheer technique, Taylor described the jazz and big band drummer Buddy Rich as "the best I've ever seen".

Speaking to Modern Drummer in 1984, Taylor described Keith Moon, the drummer of the Who, as "absolutely brilliant...he had a total unique style; he didn't owe anyone anything."

== Tributes ==
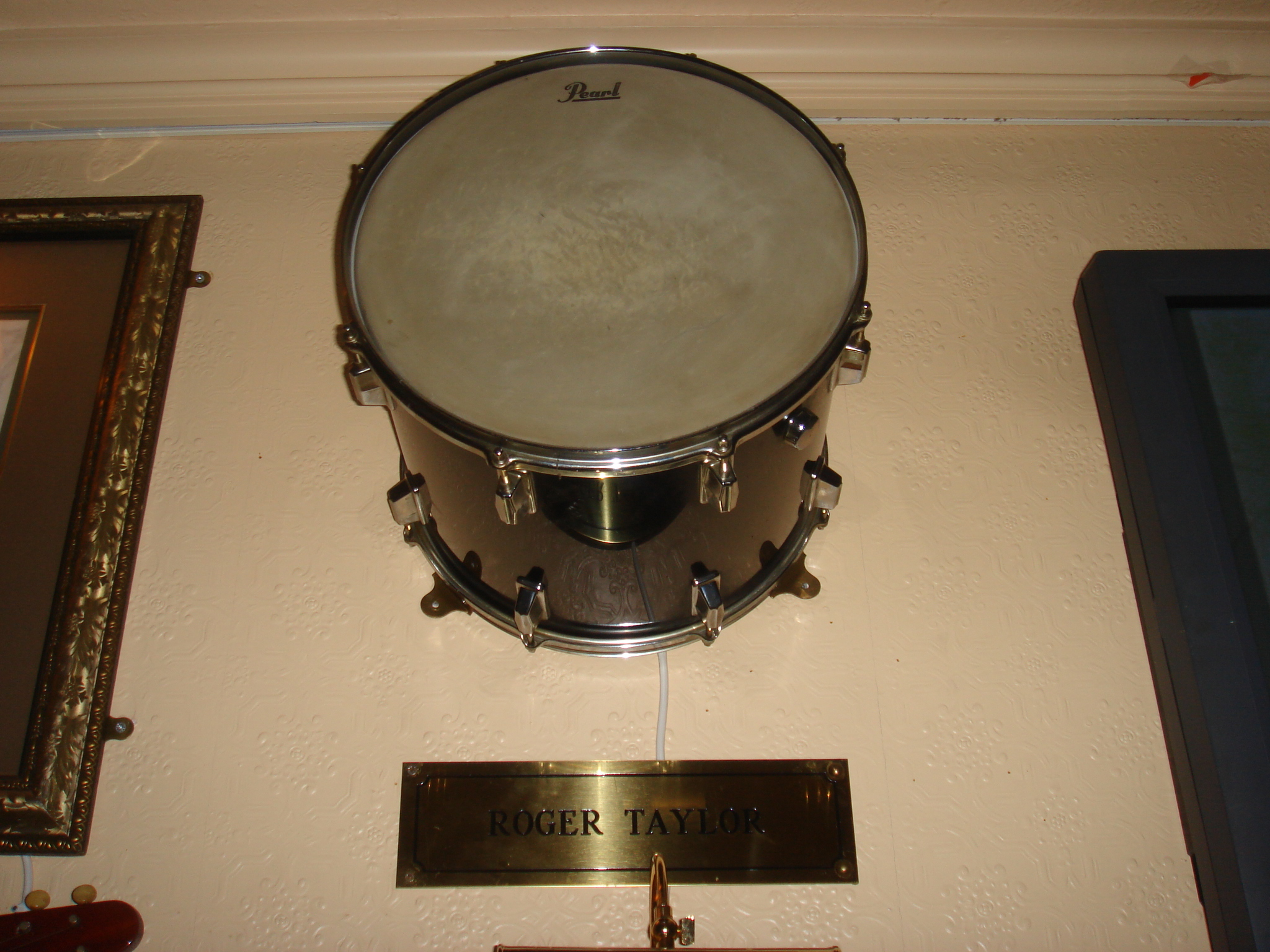
Taylor drum displayed at the Hard Rock Cafe in Madrid

In 2013, a newly discovered species of the genus Heteragrion (Odonata: Zygoptera) from Brazil was named Heteragrion rogertaylori after Taylor, in honour of his "powerful sound, wonderful lyrics and raspy voice "; one of four Heteragrion flatwing damselflies named after the bandmates, paying tribute to the 40th anniversary of Queen's founding.

In 1999, Taylor became the second living person, other than members of the British Royal Family and Francis Chichester in 1967, to appear on a Royal Mail stamp, being seen behind Freddie Mercury as part of a "Great Britons" issue. This caused controversy as it was an understood rule that the only living people allowed to appear on British stamps could be members of the Royal Family.

In 2002, Taylor appeared on the "Twelve Drummers Drumming" Christmas card in the "Twelve Days of Christmas" set sold at Woolworths to raise money for the National Society for the Prevention of Cruelty to Children, alongside Duran Duran's drummer of the same name.

Taylor was appointed Officer of the Order of the British Empire (OBE) in the 2020 New Year Honours for services to music. At his investiture ceremony at Windsor Castle in March 2022, Taylor dedicated his OBE to the recently deceased Foo Fighters drummer Taylor Hawkins, adding that Hawkins had been a mentor to his son Rufus.

== Discography ==
=== Solo albums ===
- Fun in Space (1981)
- Strange Frontier (1984)
- Happiness? (1994)
- Electric Fire (1998)
- Fun on Earth (2013)
- Outsider (2021)
- Violence Insane in a Beautiful World (2026)

=== Solo live albums ===
- Outsider Tour Live (2022)

=== Albums made with the Cross ===
Year	Title	UK	DE
1988	Shove It	58	–
1990	Mad, Bad and Dangerous to Know	–	48
1991	Blue Rock	–	–

== Portrayal in film ==
Taylor was portrayed by Ben Hardy in the 2018 film Bohemian Rhapsody.
