= Mad, Bad and Dangerous to Know (The Cross album) =

Studio album by The Cross
- Released: 26 March 1990
- Recorded: September–November 1989 at Mountain Studios, Montreux, Switzerland
- Genre: Rock
- Length: 44:26 (CD version)
- Label: EMI Electrola
- Producer: The Cross and Justin Shirley Smith

The Cross chronology
Shove It (1988)	Mad, Bad and Dangerous to Know (1990)	Blue Rock (1991)

Professional ratings
Review scores
Source	Rating
Allmusic	4/5 stars

Mad, Bad and Dangerous to Know is the second studio album by The Cross, released in 1990.

In contrast to debut Shove It, the album is a rock album and is a more collaborate effort with each band member contributing to the songwriting. Guitarist Clayton Moss sings lead vocals on "Better Things". It has been suggested that Roger Taylor contributed less to this album as he was busy promoting the Queen album The Miracle.

Following poor sales in the UK, the band were dropped by EMI.

== Track listing ==
1. "Top of the World, Ma" (Clayton Moss, Roger Taylor, Spike Edney, Peter Noone, Josh Macrae) – 3:31
2. "Liar" (Noone) – 4:32
3. "Closer to You" (Edney) – 3:15
4. "Breakdown" (Noone) – 3:53
5. "Penetration Guru" (Moss) – 3:45
6. "Power to Love" (Macrae/Noone/Moss) – 4:03
7. "Sister Blue" (Noone) – 4:13
8. "Foxy Lady" (Jimi Hendrix) – 3:26 (CD version only)
9. "Better Things" (Moss) – 2:45
10. "Passion for Trash" (Macrae) – 2:35
11. "Old Men (Lay Down)" (Taylor) – 4:52
12. "Final Destination" (Taylor) – 3:36

=== Non-album track ===
1. "In Charge of My Heart" (Taylor) 2:18

== Personnel ==
- Roger Taylor - lead & backing vocals, guitar
- Spike Edney - keyboards, mandolin, backing vocals
- Clayton Moss- lead guitar, backing vocals (lead vocals on "Better Things")
- Peter Noone- bass guitar, backing vocals
- Josh Macrae - drums, percussion, backing vocals
