= Strange Frontier =

Studio album by Roger Taylor
- Released: 25 June 1984
- Recorded: 1983–84
- Studio: Musicland (Munich); Mountain Studios (Montreux)
- Genre: Rock
- Length: 41:55
- Label: Parlophone, EMI, Capitol
- Producer: Roger Taylor, David Richards, Reinhold Mack

Roger Taylor chronology
Fun in Space (1981)	Strange Frontier (1984)	Happiness? (1994)

Singles from Strange Frontier
- 1. "Man on Fire" Released: 4 June 1984; 2. "Strange Frontier" Released: 30 July 1984; 3. "Beautiful Dreams" Released: August 1984 (Portugal)

Professional ratings
Review scores
Source	Rating
Allmusic	link
MusicHound Rock	3/5 stars

Strange Frontier is the second album by the English musician Roger Taylor, released in 1984. This album includes two covers as well as a heavier sound than the previous album. Although Taylor again played most of the instruments himself (drums, guitars, bass and keyboards) and did most of the vocals, there were some occasional cameos from producer David Richards (on synths and piano), Status Quo member Rick Parfitt (on rhythm guitar) and Queen bandmates John Deacon (on bass and mixing), Brian May (rhythm guitar on "Man on Fire") and Freddie Mercury (who provided backing vocals on "Killing Time"). The US edition has the track order rearranged.

Many of the songs here were previously worked by Queen during The Works sessions in 1983, and many of the arrangement were reused, hence the similarity of sounds and styles between this album and the album that Queen had released in 1984.

== Track listing ==
All tracks are written by Roger Taylor, except where noted.

Side one
No.	Title	Length
1.	"Strange Frontier"	4:16
2.	"Beautiful Dreams"	4:23
3.	"Man on Fire"	4:05
4.	"Racing in the Street" (Bruce Springsteen)	4:28
5.	"Masters of War" (Bob Dylan)	3:51

Side two
No.	Title	Length
1.	"Killing Time"	4:58
2.	"Abandonfire" (Taylor, David Richards)	4:12
3.	"Young Love"	3:22
4.	"It's an Illusion" (Taylor, Rick Parfitt)	4:03
5.	"I Cry for You (Love, Hope and Confusion)" (Taylor, Richards)	4:16

== Personnel ==
- Roger Taylor - vocals, drums, keyboards, bass guitar, guitars
- David Richards - keyboards
- Freddie Mercury - backing vocals on "Killing Time"
- Rick Parfitt - guitar & backing vocals on "It's an Illusion"
- John Deacon - bass guitar on "It's an Illusion"
- Brian May - rhythm guitar on "Man On Fire"

== Singles ==
- "Man On Fire"

A-Side: "Man On Fire"
B-Side: "Killing Time"
Released on 4 June 1984.
Reached #66 in the UK Singles Chart.
Released in the UK, Japan, USA, Canada, Germany, France, Spain, Portugal, Australia and South Africa.

- "Strange Frontier"

A-Side: "Strange Frontier"
B-Side: "I Cry For You"
Released on 30 July 1984.
Reached #98 in the UK Singles Chart.
Released in the UK, USA, Canada and The Netherlands.

- "Beautiful Dreams"

A-Side: "Beautiful Dreams"
B-Side: "Young Love"
Released in August 1984.
Only released in Portugal.

== Charts ==
Chart (1984)	Peak position
German Albums (Offizielle Top 100)	53
UK Albums (OCC)	30
