= Blue Rock (album) =

Studio album by The Cross
- Released: 9 September 1991
- Recorded: February–August 1991
- Studio: Real World Studios
- Genre: Rock
- Length: 45:00
- Label: EMI Electrola
- Producer: Mark Wallis

The Cross chronology
| Mad, Bad and Dangerous to Know (1990) | Blue Rock (1991) |

Professional ratings
Review scores
| Source | Rating |
|---|---|
| Allmusic | 3/5 stars |

Blue Rock is the third and final album released by The Cross. Like Mad, Bad and Dangerous to Know, Blue Rock is a straight rock album which is currently out of print and has become a hard-to-find item. Spike Edney contributed a lot more to the record, writing or co-writing seven of the ten tracks of the album.

Because of the failure of their previous albums, Blue Rock was only released in Germany, Japan, Italy (vinyl only) and France (cassette only). Blue Rock, too, failed to sell many copies. This contributed to the disbanding of The Cross two years later.

== Track listing ==
1. "Bad Attitude" (Peter Noone, Clayton Moss, Spike Edney, Josh Macrae, Roger Taylor) – 4:45
2. "New Dark Ages" (Taylor) – 4:58
3. "Dirty Mind" (Edney) – 3:30
4. "Baby It's Alright" (Edney) – 4:06
5. "Ain't Put Nothin' Down" (Moss) – 4:30
6. "The Also Rans" (Taylor) – 5:27
7. "Millionaire" (Moss, Edney, Noone, Macrae) – 3:43
8. "Put it All Down to Love" (Edney) – 3:34
9. "Hand of Fools" (Noone, Edney) – 4:31
10. "Life Changes" (Moss, Noone, Edney, Macrae) – 5:56

=== Non-Album Track ===
1. "Heartland" (Noone) 4:45

== Personnel ==
- Roger Taylor – lead vocals
- Spike Edney – keyboards, backing vocals
- Clayton Moss- guitars, backing vocals
- Peter Noone – bass guitar, backing vocals, lead vocals on "Heartland"
- Josh Macrae – drums, backing vocals
- Geoffrey Richardson - viola, violin
- Helen Liebman - cello
- Candy Yates - backing vocals
- Clare Yates - backing vocals
