= Spike Edney =

English musician (born 1951)

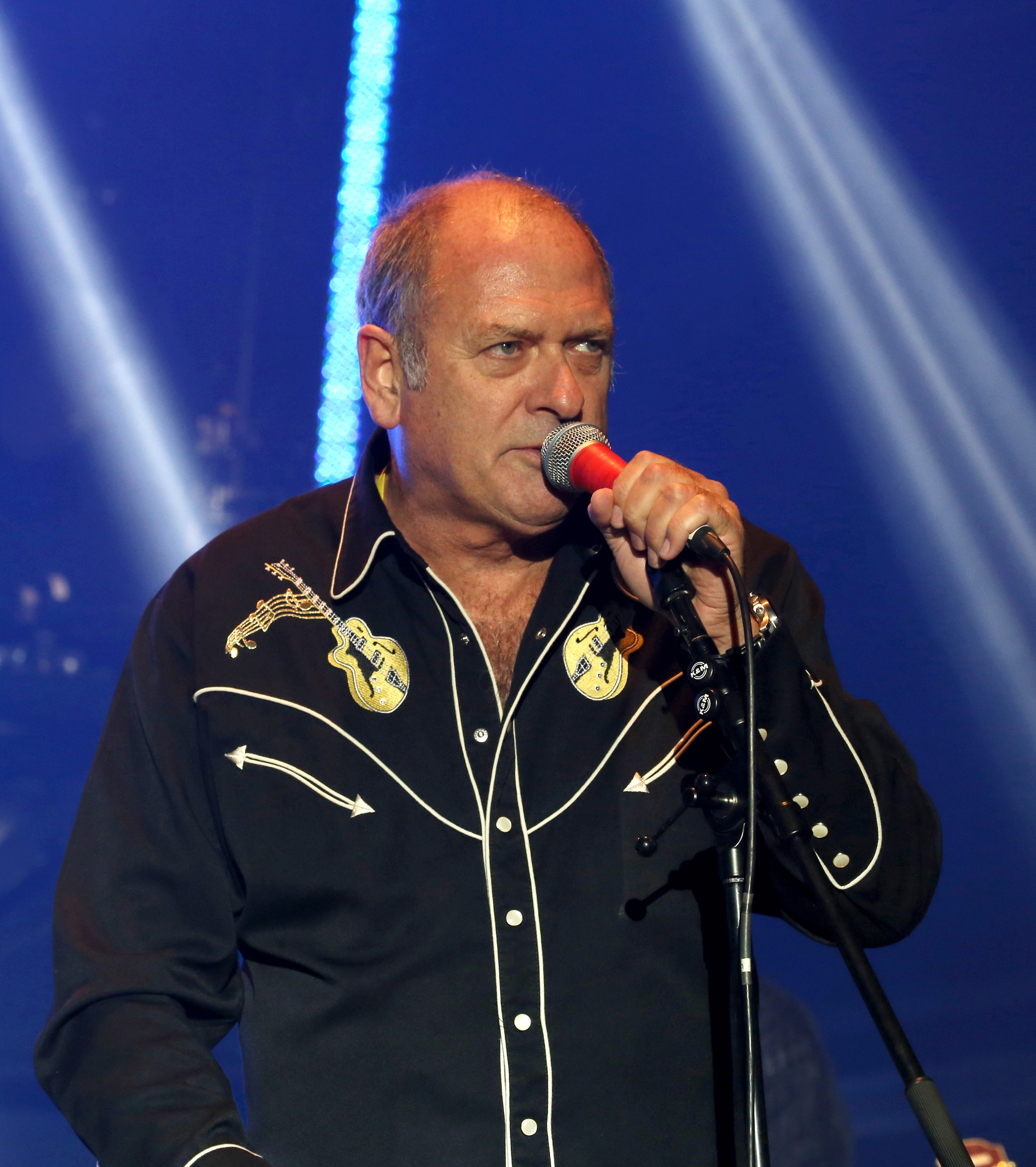

Background information
- Born: 11 December 1951 (age 74); Portsmouth, Hampshire, England
- Origin: Hackney, London, England
- Genres: Rock, pop, hard rock
- Occupations: Musician
- Instruments: Keyboards; guitar; vocals; trombone
- Years active: 1970s–present
- Member of: Queen; SAS Band
- Formerly of: The Cross; The Brian May Band; Queen Extravaganza

Philip "Spike" Edney (born 11 December 1951) is an English musician who has performed with a number of bands since the 1970s, most notably with Queen in their live concerts since 1984.

== Career ==
=== Queen ===
Edney's association with Queen began in 1984 during The Works tour, replacing Fred Mandel. Edney's collaboration with Queen included mostly keyboards (his main instrument), plus rhythm guitar and backing vocals. After the death of Queen's lead singer and main pianist Freddie Mercury in 1991, Edney took over his role on piano during the Queen + Paul Rodgers 2005, 2006, and 2008 tours, playing all piano parts on a Korg Triton keyboard, in addition to all other keyboard parts. He returned as keyboardist for the Queen + Adam Lambert tours in 2012, 2014, and the 2015–2020 tour schedule. He has also been the keyboardist for the London production of We Will Rock You since it opened in 2002.

Edney was also the musical director of the official Queen tribute band, the Queen Extravaganza.

Edney can be seen on Queen's Live at Wembley Stadium and Hungarian Rhapsody concert films, playing rhythm guitar on "Hammer to Fall," and piano on both "Crazy Little Thing Called Love" and "Tutti Frutti." He can also be seen playing in the background during Queen's 1985 Live Aid performance at Wembley Stadium. He would later comment that once Queen got on stage, the "lazy afternoon feeling..." "...changed instantly into a proper gig".

=== Other work ===
During the mid-1970s, Edney recorded and toured with the Tymes and Ben E. King. As well as keyboards he also plays bass, guitar, trombone and contributes backing vocals. In the late 1970s, he was musical director for Edwin Starr and, during the early 1980s, worked with Duran Duran, the Boomtown Rats, Dexys Midnight Runners, Bucks Fizz, Haircut One Hundred and the Rolling Stones. He also appeared with Peter Green on his comeback tour.

=== SAS Band ===
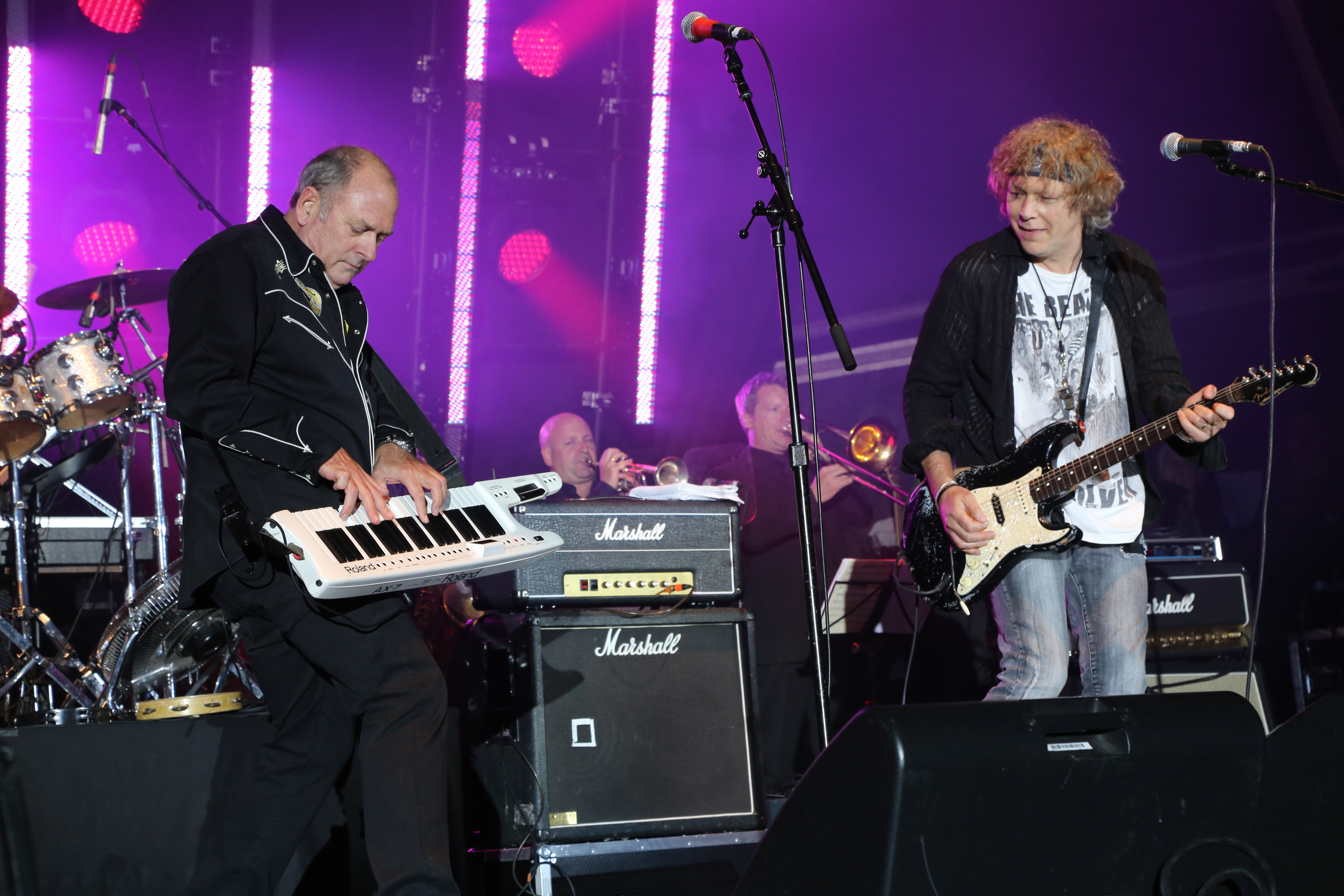
Edney performing with Jamie Moses and the SAS band in 2013

Edney formed SAS Band (Spike's All Stars) in 1994, playing their first gig at The Gosport Festival (near Edney's hometown of Portsmouth). The original band featured Cozy Powell on drums, Neil Murray on bass and Jamie Moses on guitar. The band has constantly fluctuating personnel, including musicians from Queen, Whitesnake, Free, Roxy Music, Toto, and Spandau Ballet, and solo artists including Fish, Roy Wood, Leo Sayer, Kiki Dee, and Paul Young. Others that have appeared with the band include Suggs, Lionel Richie, Bob Geldof, Patti Russo, Madeline Bell, and Toyah Willcox.

== Equipment ==
During tours with Queen in the mid 1980s, Edney played a Gibson Les Paul Junior as his main guitar for the rhythm parts of "Hammer to Fall". During the Queen + Paul Rogers tours he used a Korg Triton, and during the Queen + Adam Lambert tours he used a Korg M3 before settling for a Korg Kronos.

== Selected discography ==
=== Albums ===
- Queen: A Kind of Magic (1986)
- Queen: Live Magic (1986)
- The Cross: Shove It (1987)
- The Cross: Mad, Bad and Dangerous to Know (1990)
- The Cross: Blue Rock (1991)
- Lucio Battisti: Cosa succederà alla ragazza (1992)
- Queen: Live at Wembley '86 (1992)
- The Brian May Band: Live at the Brixton Academy (1994)
- SAS Band: SAS Band (1997)
- Brian May: Another World (1998; keyboards on "Slow Down")
- SAS Band: The Show (2001)
- Queen + Paul Rodgers: Return of the Champions (CD/DVD, 2005)
- Queen + Paul Rodgers: Live in Ukraine (CD/DVD, 2009)
- Queen: Hungarian Rhapsody (2012)
- Queen + Adam Lambert: Live in Japan (2016)
- Queen: Bohemian Rhapsody: The Original Soundtrack (2018)
- Queen + Adam Lambert: Live Around The World (2020)
- Roger Taylor: Outsider Live (2022)

=== Videos ===
- Queen: Live in Rio (VHS/DVD, 1985/2013)
- Queen: We Are The Champions: Final Live in Japan (1992)
- Queen: Live at Wembley Stadium (VHS/DVD, 1990/2003/2011)
- Queen: The Freddie Mercury Tribute Concert (VHS/DVD, 1992/2002/2013)
- The Brian May Band: Live at the Brixton Academy (VHS, 1994)
- 46664 – The Event (DVD, 2004)
- Live Aid (DVD, 2004)
- Queen + Paul Rodgers: Return of the Champions (CD/DVD, 2005)
- Queen + Paul Rodgers: Super Live in Japan (DVD, 2006)
- Queen + Paul Rodgers: Live in Ukraine (CD/DVD, 2009)
- Queen: Hungarian Rhapsody (2012)
- Queen + Adam Lambert: Live in Japan (2016)
- Queen + Béjart: Ballet For Life (2019)
- Queen + Adam Lambert: Live Around The World (2020)
