= Josh Macrae =

English rock drummer and record producer

Joshua J. Macrae (born 1964) is an English drummer, audio engineer and record producer.

Starting with a snare drum and hi-hat in Primrose Hill Primary orchestra then school punk band Inconvenience in Cornwall, he left school and toured Europe with local band Metro Glider. Upon return he moved to Bath and became a founder member of Still Life, later renamed Wadi Vision, showcasing at The Embassy Club and doing a Radio 1 session for Bruno Brookes. With the demise of Wadi Vision he played various sessions, did a short promotional tour of Europe with Spandau Ballet, standing in for John Keeble, who remained home with his expectant wife. In 1987, answering an advert in the back of Melody Maker, he landed the drum role in Roger Taylor's band The Cross. He went on to co-produce all of Taylor's solo albums from 1992 on, played drums at his solo concerts and has worked with Queen in the studio from 1992.

== Selected discography ==
- The Cross: Shove It (1988)
- The Cross: Mad, Bad and Dangerous to Know (1990)
- The Cross: Blue Rock (1991)
- Queen+: The Freddie Mercury Tribute Concert (DVD, 2002; percussion)
- Queen: Queen Rock Montreal (2007)
- Queen: Hungarian Rhapsody: Queen Live in Budapest (2012)
- Queen: Live at the Rainbow '74 (2014)
- Queen: Queen Forever (2014)
- Queen: On Air (2016)
