= Starfleet (disambiguation) =

Starfleet is the paramilitary defense, research, diplomacy, and exploration force in the Star Trek franchise.

Starfleet or Star Fleet may also refer to:

- Starfleet International, a Star Trek fan club
- Star Fleet Battles, a Star Trek strategy board war game
- X-Bomber, a Japanese science fiction puppet show, the English-dubbed version of which is named Star Fleet
  - "Star Fleet", the theme tune to the English-dubbed version of X-Bomber, written and performed by Paul Bliss and covered by Brian May
- Star Fleet (game series), a series of computer games unrelated to the Star Trek franchise. Existed since the late 1970s
- The Imperial Navy (Star Wars) in Star Wars, which is at times referred to as the "Imperial Starfleet"
  - The Galactic Republic's Judicial Starfleet in Star Wars
- The Star Fleet, a fleet of tugboats in the British animation series TUGS
- Star Fleet Project, a one-off 1983 music project organized by Brian May
  - "Star Fleet" (song), the title track
- Starfleet Wars, a space battle game by Superior Models, featuring five races: Terrans, Entomalians, Avarians, Aquarians, and Carnivorans

== Ships ==
- The Star Fleet, owned by the Alaska Packers' Association, was the last fleet of commercial sailing vessels on the West Coast.
- The "Star Fleet" of the Star Line, Ltd. shipping company consisted of seven ships, some of which were sold to the Alaska Packers' Association.

== See also ==
- Aeroflot, meaning "Air Fleet" in Russian. The flag carrier and largest airline of the Russian Federation (the USSR's successor state).
