= Brian May discography =

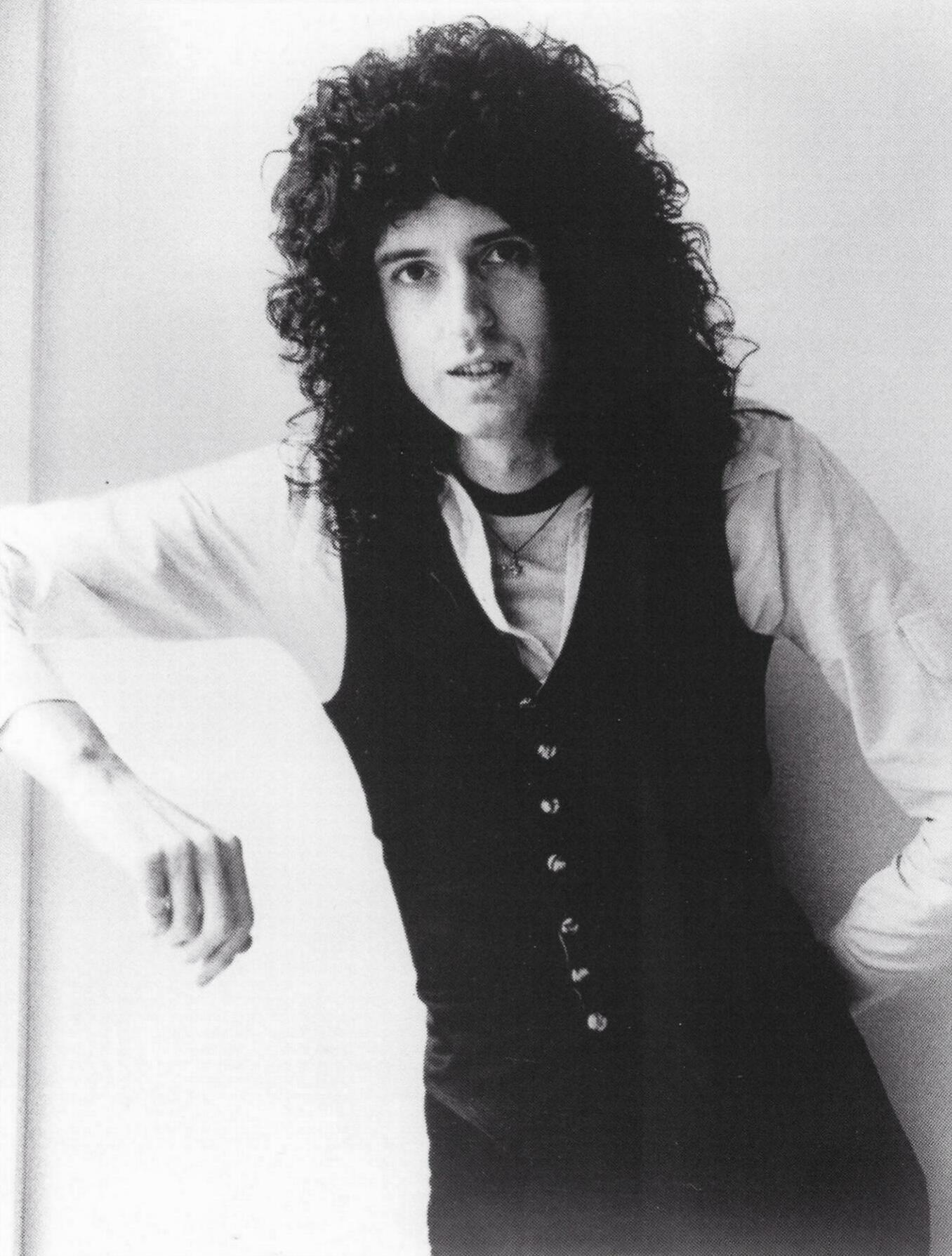
May in 1977

This is the discography of Brian May.

== Albums ==
=== Studio albums ===
Year	Title	Chart positions									Certifications
Year	Title	UK	AUS	AUT	CAN	GER	NED	SWE	SWI	US	Certifications
1992	Back to the Light	6	94	20	70	10^{[A]}	11	25	9^{[A]}	159	UK: Gold
1998	Another World	14	165	47	—	15^{[B]}	47	—	31^{[B]}	—	
2000	La musique de Furia	—	—	—	—	—	—	—	—	—	

- A Peak position upon reissue in 2021.
- B Peak position upon reissue in 2022.

=== Live albums ===
Year	Title	Chart positions					
Year	Title	UK	AUS	AUT	GER	NED	SWI
1994	Live at the Brixton Academy (The Brian May Band)	20	190	38	71	35	33

=== EPs ===
Year	Title	Chart positions		
Year	Title	UK	CAN	US
1983	Star Fleet Project (Brian May + Friends)	35	69	147
1993	Resurrection – Japanese Tour Mini Album	—	—	—
1998	Red Special – Japanese Tour Mini Album	—	—	—
1998	Retro Rock Special (as T. E. Conway)	—	—	—

=== Collaboration albums ===
Year	Artist	Title	Chart positions
Year	Artist	Title	UK
1985	Chris Thompson featuring Brian May	Radio Voices	—
2013	Tangerine Dream and Brian May	Starmus – Sonic Universe	—
2013	Kerry Ellis & Brian May	Acoustic by Candlelight	—
2017	Kerry Ellis & Brian May	Golden Days	27

=== With Smile ===
Year of release	Title	Comment
1982	Gettin' Smile (LP, Japan)	Tracks "Doing Alright", "Blag", "April Lady", "Polar Bear", "Earth", "Step on Me" [all songs recorded 1969]
1997	Ghost of a Smile (CD, Netherlands)	Tracks "Doing Alright", "Blag", "April Lady", "Polar Bear", "Earth", "Step on Me" [all songs recorded 1969]

== Singles ==
=== As lead artist ===
Year	Title	Chart positions									Certifications	Album
Year	Title	UK	AUS	BEL	CAN	EUR	IRE	NLD	PRT	US Main.	Certifications	Album
1983	"Star Fleet"	65	—	—	—	—	—	—	—	—		Star Fleet Project
1991	"Driven by You"	6	162	35	70	20	14	10	9	9		Back to the Light
1992	"Too Much Love Will Kill You"	5	18	2	—	10	7	1	8	—	UK: Silver; NLD: Gold	Back to the Light
1992	"Back to the Light"	19	123	39	—	—	—	20	—	—		Back to the Light
1993	"Resurrection" (with Cozy Powell)	23	—	—	—	—	—	—	—	—		Back to the Light
1993	"Last Horizon"	51	—	—	—	—	—	—	—	—		Back to the Light
1994	"The Man from Manhattan" (with Freddie Mercury & Eddie Howell)	—	—	—	—	—	—	—	—	—		non-album
1995	"Nobody Knew (Black White House)" (with Carmine Appice's Guitar Zeus)	—	—	—	—	—	—	—	—	—		Carmine Appice's Guitar Zeus
1998	"The Business (Rock on Cozy Mix)"	51	—	—	—	—	—	—	—	—		Another World
1998	"On My Way Up"	—	—	—	—	—	—	79	—	—		Another World
1998	"Another World"	—	—	—	—	—	—	—	—	—		Another World
1998	"Why Don't We Try Again"	44	—	—	—	—	—	—	—	—		Another World
2012	"Born Free" (with Kerry Ellis)	—	—	—	—	—	—	—	—	—		Acoustic by Candlelight
2013	"The Kissing Me Song" (with Kerry Ellis)	—	—	—	—	—	—	—	—	—		Acoustic by Candlelight
2013	"Save the Badger Badger Badger" (Weebl & Brian May featuring Brian Blessed)	79	—	—	—	—	—	—	—	—		non-album
2014	"One Night in Hell" (with the Czech National Symphony Orchestra)	—	—	—	—	—	—	—	—	—		non-album
2016	"One Voice" (with Norah Jones, Aimee Mann, Susanna Hoffs, Lydia Loveless, Neko Case, Kathryn Calder)	—	—	—	—	—	—	—	—	—		non-album
2019	"New Horizons (Ultima Thule Mix)"	—	—	—	—	—	—	—	—	—		non-album
2019	"Holy Man" (with Dennis Wilson, Taylor Hawkins and Roger Taylor)	—	—	—	—	—	—	—	—	—		non-album
2021	"Panic Attack 2021 (It's Gonna Be Alright)" (with Kerry Ellis)	—	—	—	—	—	—	—	—	—		non-album
2022	"Floating in Heaven" (with Graham Gouldman)	—	—	—	—	—	—	—	—	—		I Have Notes

=== As featured artist ===
Year	Title	Chart positions					Certifications	Album
Year	Title	UK	BEL	IRE	NED	US	Certifications	Album
1987	"A Time for Heroes" (Meat Loaf with Brian May)	—	—	—	—	—		non-album
1992	"We Are the Champions" (Hank Marvin feat. Brian May)	66	—	—	—	—		non-album
2002	"If We Believe" (Lynn Carey Saylor feat. Brian May)	—	—	—	—	—		You Like It Clean
2006	"Move It" (Cliff Richard feat. Brian May & Brian Bennett)	—	—	—	—	—		non-album
2009	"Somebody to Love" (Catherine Porter feat. Brian May)	—	—	—	—	—		Gems for Ruby
2011	"Yoü and I" (Lady Gaga feat. Brian May)	23	4	32	2	6	US: 3× Platinum	Born This Way
2012	"Rockstar" (Dappy feat. Brian May)	2	99	15	—	—	UK: Silver	Bad Intentions
2019	"Blue on Black" (Five Finger Death Punch feat. Kenny Wayne Shepherd, Brantley Gilbert and Brian May)	—	—	—	—	66	US: Platinum	And Justice for None
2020	"One Beautiful Christmas Day" (Kerry Ellis feat. Brian May)	—	—	—	—	—		non-album

=== With Smile ===
Year of release	Title	Album
1969	"Earth" / "Step on Me"	non-album

== Videography ==
=== Video releases ===
- 1983: Star Licks Master Series (VHS; in 1993 reissued under the title Master Session)
- 1994: Live at the Brixton Academy (VHS)
- 2013: The Candlelight Concerts – Live at Montreux 2013 (DVD/BD) (with Kerry Ellis)

=== Music videos ===
Year	Title	Album
1983	"Star Fleet"	Star Fleet Project
1991	"Driven by You"	Back to the Light
1992	"Too Much Love Will Kill You"	Back to the Light
1992	"Back to the Light"	Back to the Light
1993	"Resurrection"	Back to the Light
1996	"F.B.I."	Twang!
2021	"Panic Attack 2021 (It's Gonna Be Alright)" (with Kerry Ellis)	non-album
2021	"Back to the Light" (The Time Traveller 1992-2021)	Back to the Light
2022	"On My Way Up"	Another World
2022	"Another World"/"Otro Mundo"	Another World

=== Collaborations in music videos ===
Year	Title	Other Performer	Album
1996	"Reaching Out"	Rock Therapy	non-album
2012	"Rockstar"	Dappy	Bad Intentions
2019	"Blue on Black"	Five Finger Death Punch	And Justice for None
2020	"I'm a Woman"	Woman	non-album
2020	"One Beautiful Christmas Day"	Kerry Ellis	non-album

== Appearances on various artists compilations ==
Year of release	Compilation	Song
1994	Greenpeace – Alternative NRG	"New Damage" (with Soundgarden)
1995	In from the Storm (tribute to Jimi Hendrix)	"One Rainy Wish" (later released on the album Another World)
1996	Pinocchio: Original Motion Picture Soundtrack	"Il Colosso" (with Jerry Hadley, Sissel Kyrkjebø, 'Just William'), "What Are We Made Of?" (with Sissel Kyrkjebø)
1996	Twang! A Tribute to Hank Marvin & The Shadows	"F.B.I." (later released as a B-side of the single On My Way Up)
1998	Lullabies with a Difference	"My Boy" (recorded in 1982)
2000	Music from and Inspired by Mission: Impossible 2	"Have a Cigar" (with the Foo Fighters)
2002	Good Rockin' Tonight – The Legacy of Sun Records	"I Don't Want Nobody Teasing Around with Me"(Japanese edition only)
2002	Party at the Palace	"God Save the Queen"
2004	Music from and Inspired by Spider-Man 2	"Someone to Die For" (with Jimmy Gnecco)
2012	BBC Radio 1's Live Lounge 2012	"We Will Rock You" (with Dappy)

== As producer, songwriter or session musician ==
=== Producer ===
Year of release	Collaborated with	Release	May's contribution
1986	Minako Honda	Cancel	production
1987	Minako Honda	"Golden Days", "Crazy Nights"	songwriting, production, guitar
1987	Bad News	Bad News	production
1987	Heavy Pettin	Lettin Loose	produced by May and Mack
1988	Anita Dobson	Talking of Love	songwriting, production, guitar, backing vocals
1988	Anita Dobson	"In One of My Weaker Moments"	production, guitar
1989	Ian & Belinda	"Who Wants to Live Forever"	production, guitar (bass by John Deacon, drums by Roger Taylor)
1991	Hale and Pace and the Stonkers	"The Stonk"	production, guitar (drums by Roger Taylor)

=== Session musician and songwriter ===
Year of release	Collaborated with	Song	Album/Record	May's contribution Guitar unless stated
1975	Eddie Howell	"Man from Manhattan"	Man from Manhattan	backing vocals and guitar (piano and backing vocals by Freddie Mercury)
1976	Ian Hunter	"You Nearly Did Me In"	All-American Alien Boy	backing vocals by May, Mercury and Roger Taylor
1978	Lonnie Donegan	"Digging My Potatoes"	Puttin' on the Style	
1980	Quartz	"Circles" (recorded in 1977)	B-side of the single "Stoking the Fires of Hell" (1980); also bonus track on the 2004 reissue of the album Stand Up and Fight	
1983	Jeffrey Osborne	"Stay with Me Tonight", "Two Wrongs Don't Make a Right"	Stay with Me Tonight	
1984	Billy Squier	"(Another) 1984"	Signs of Life	
1985	Chris Thompson	"A Shift in the Wind, Parts 1 and 2"	Radio Voices	
1986	Ramoncín	"Como un susurro"	La vida en el filo	
1988	The Cross	"Love Lies Bleeding (She Was a Wicked, Wily Waitress)"	Shove It	
1989	Holly Johnson	"Love Train"	Blast	
1989	Living in a Box	"Blow the House Down"	Gatecrashing	
1989	Black Sabbath	"When Death Calls"	Headless Cross	guitar solo
1989	Fuzzbox	"Self!"	Big Bang!	
1989	Artists United for Nature	"Yes We Can"	Yes We Can (single; also released on the compilation Earthrise – The Rainforest Album)	
1989	Rock Aid Armenia	"Smoke on the Water"	"Smoke on the Water"	guitar (drums by Roger Taylor)
1990	Rock Against Repatriation	"Sailing"	"Sailing"	
1991	D-Rok	"Red Planet Blues", "Get Out of My Way"	Oblivion	
1992	Extreme	"Love of My Life"	Song for Love (for the Terence Higgins Trust)	
1992	Judie Tzuke	"I Can Read Books"	Wonderland	
1992	Phenomena	"A Whole Lot of Love" (recorded in 1988)	Phenomena III: Inner Vision	
1992	Tony Martin	"If There Is a Heaven"	Back Where I Belong	
1992	Cozy Powell	"Somewhere in Time" (instrumental version of "Nothin' But Blue"], "Ride to Win"	The Drums Are Back	guitar (bass by John Deacon on "Somewhere in Time")
1992	Steve Hackett	"Don’t Fall Away from Me" (recorded in 1986)	The Unauthorised Biography	
1993	Paul Rodgers	"I'm Ready"	Muddy Water Blues: A Tribute to Muddy Waters	
1993	Steve Hackett	"Cassandra" (recorded in 1986)	Guitar Noir (bonus track)	
1993	The Left Handed Marriage	"Appointment", "She Was Once My Friend", "I Need Time" (recorded in 1967)	Crazy Chain	guitar, backing vocals; I Need Time written by Bill Richards and May
1994	Os Paralamas do Sucesso	"El Vampiro Bajo El Sol"	Severino	
1995	Jennifer Rush	"Who Wants to Live Forever"	Out of My Hands	vocals and guitar
1995	Gordon Giltrap	"Heartsong" (recorded in 1993)	Music for the Small Screen	
1995	Carmine Appice	"Nobody Knew (Black White House)"	Carmine Appice's Guitar Zeus	
1995	S.O.L. (Stefan Zauner)	"Make My Dream Come True"	S.O.L. – Some Other Language	
1996	Status Quo	"Raining in My Heart"	Don't Stop	
1996	Rock Therapy	"Reaching Out"	Reaching Out (single; for the Nordoff-Robbins Music Therapy Centre)	
2000	Steve Hackett	"Slot Machine" (recorded in 1986)	Feedback '86	
2000	Tony Iommi	"Goodbye Lament" (featuring Dave Grohl), "Flame On" (featuring Ian Astbury)	Iommi	
2000	Freddie Mercury	"She Blows Hot and Cold (Alternative Version)" (recorded in 1984)	The Solo Collection (box set)	
2000	Foo Fighters	"Have a Cigar"	Mission: Impossible 2 (soundtrack)	
2002	Michael Kamen	"Light the Fire Within"	unreleased; official theme of the 2002 Winter Olympics	
2002	Claire Sweeney	"Too Much Love Will Kill You"	Claire	
2002	Foo Fighters	"Tired of You"	One by One	
2003	The Yardbirds	"Mr. You're a Better Man Than I"	Birdland	
2003	Tim Staffell	"Earth", "Doin' Alright"	Amigo	guitar & vocals
2004	Zucchero	"Il mare impetuoso al tramonto salì sulla luna e dietro una tendina di stelle..."	Zu & Co.	
2006	Meat Loaf	"Bad for Good"	Bat Out of Hell III: The Monster Is Loose	
2007	Lynn Carey Saylor	"We Belong"	You Like It Clean	guitar & background vocals
2007	Guns N' Roses	"Catcher in the Rye (Demo)"	Chinese Democracy (sessions)	Uncredited guitar solo
2008	Minako Honda	"Amazing Grace (Traditional) Produced by Brian May"	Eternal Melody	Arrangement, backing vocals, keyboards, toy koto, production
2008	Kerry Ellis	"Defying Gravity", "I'm Not that Girl", "No-One but You (Only the Good Die Young)"	Wicked in Rock	Arrangement, bass, guitars, keys, production, programming
2010	Kerry Ellis	"Dangerland", "Anthem", "I Can't Be Your Friend (This Can't Be Over)", "Defying Gravity", "I'm Not that Girl", "You Have to Be There", "Love It When You Call", "Save Me", "Diamonds Are Forever", "No-One but You (Only the Good Die Young)", "I Loved a Butterfly"	Anthems	Arrangement, backing vocals, bass, guitars, piano, keyboards, production
2010	Taylor Hawkins and the Coattail Riders	"Way Down", "Don't Have to Speak"	Red Light Fever	guitar
2010	Meat Loaf	"Love Is Not Real", "The Song of Madness"	Hang Cool Teddy Bear	
2011	Tangerine Dream		Starmus – Sonic Universe	
2011	Lady Gaga	"You and I"	Born This Way	guitar
2015	Motörhead	"The Devil"	Bad Magic	guitar solo
2020	Woman	"I'm a Woman"	"I'm a Woman"	guitar & production
Live Recordings (Selection)
1988	Prince's Trust Gala Concert		Prince's Trust Rock Gala (VHS; recorded live at the Royal Albert Hall on 6 June 1988)	guitar (bass by Deacon)
1992	Pavarotti and Friends	"Too Much Love Will Kill You", "La donna è mobile"	Pavarotti & Friends (VHS; recorded live in Modena on 27 September 1992)	
2005	The Strat Pack	"Peggy Sue", "Maybe Baby", "I Fought the Law", "Oh Boy!", "That'll Be the Day" (with The Crickets and Albert Lee); "All Right Now" (with Paul Rodgers)	The Strat Pack: Live in Concert (DVD; recorded live at the concert from the 50th Anniversary of the Fender Stratocaster guitar on 24 September 2004)	

== Computer games ==
- 1994: Rise of the Robots (contains reworked tracks from the 1992 album Back to the Light)
- 1996: Rise 2: Resurrection (contains "Cyborg"; in 1998 released on the album Another World)
