= Northridge, Los Angeles =

Neighborhood in California, US

Northridge
- Neighborhood of Los Angeles
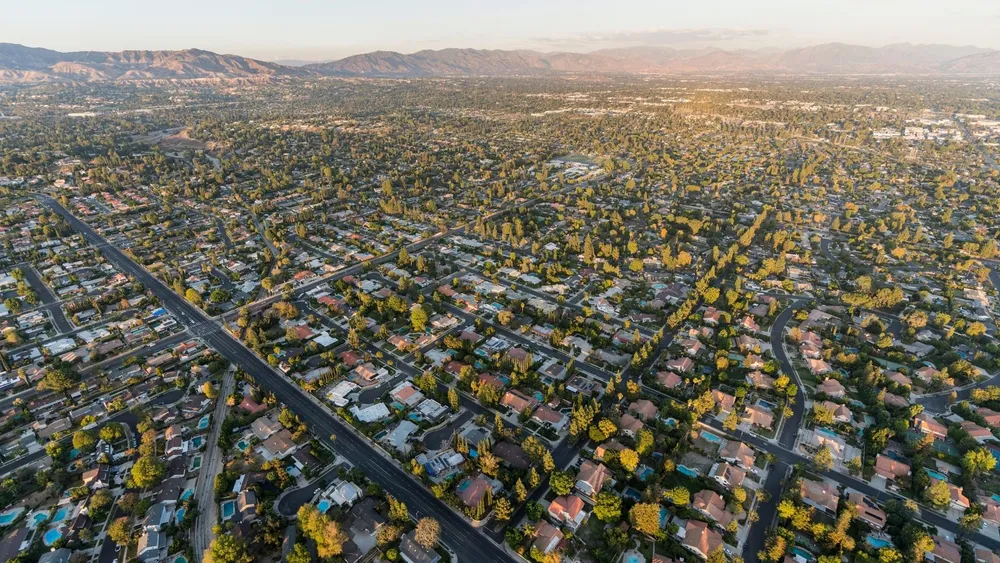

- Location within Los Angeles/San Fernando Valley Northridge (the Los Angeles metropolitan area)
- Coordinates: 34°13′41″N 118°32′09″W
- Country: United States
- State: California
- County: Los Angeles
- City: Los Angeles
- Named for: Its location in the northern parts of Los Angeles

Population (2008)
  - Total: 61,993
- ZIP Codes: 91324–91325; 91327–91330
- Area codes: 818 and 747

Northridge is a neighborhood in the San Fernando Valley region of the City of Los Angeles. The community is home to California State University, Northridge and the Northridge Fashion Center.

Originally named Zelzah by settlers in 1908, the community was renamed North Los Angeles in 1929 but the appellation sometimes caused confusion between North Hollywood and Los Angeles. In 1938, civic leader Carl S. Dentzel decided to rename the community to Northridge Village, which morphed into modern-day Northridge.

The Northridge area can trace its history back to the Tongva people and later to Spanish explorers. It was sold by the Mexican governor Pío Pico to Eulogio de Celis, whose heirs divided it for resale.

== Population ==
The 2000 U.S. census counted 57,561 residents in the 9.47-square-mile (24.5 km^{2}) Northridge neighborhood—or 6,080 people per square mile (2,350/km^{2}), among the lowest population densities for the city. In 2008, the city estimated that the population had increased to 61,993. In 2000 the median age for residents was 32, about average for city and county neighborhoods; the percentage of residents aged 19 to 34 was among the county's highest.

The neighborhood was considered "highly diverse" ethnically within Los Angeles, with a high percentage of Asian people for the county. The breakdown was whites, 49.5%; Latinos, 26.1%; Asians, 14.5%; Blacks, 5.4%; and others, 4.6%. Mexico (24.7%) and the Philippines (9.8%) were the most common places of birth for the 31.8% of the residents who were born abroad—an average figure for Los Angeles.

The median annual household income, expressed in 2024 dollars, was $99,610 in Northridge’s 91324 ZIP Code and $87,168 in its 91325 ZIP Code, both considered high for the city. According to the 2020–2024 American Community Survey, renters occupied 46.4% of the housing stock, and house- or apartment-owners held 53.6%. The average household size of 2.7 people was considered average for Los Angeles.

In 2000, there were 3,803 military veterans, or 8.5% of the population, a high percentage compared to the rest of the city.

== Geography ==
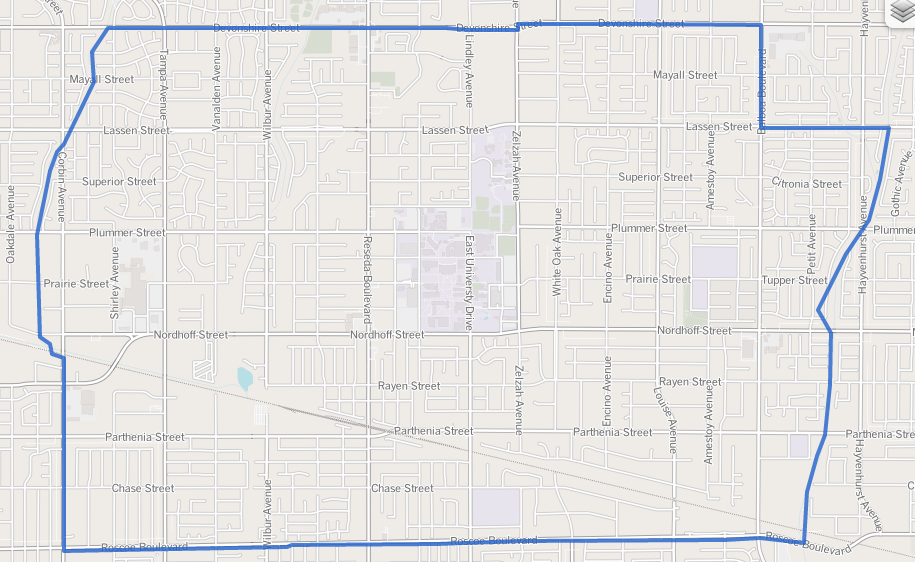
Northridge neighborhood as delineated by the Los Angeles Times

Northridge touches Porter Ranch and Granada Hills on the north, North Hills on the east, Van Nuys on the southeast, Lake Balboa and Reseda on the south, and Winnetka and Chatsworth on the west.

== History ==
=== Tongva ===
The Northridge area was first inhabited over 2,000 years ago by the Tongva. The village of Totonga was located in the Northridge area. The Tongva lived in dome-shaped houses and are sometimes referred to as the "people of the earth". They spoke a Takic Uto-Aztecan (Shoshonean) language. Many of their pictographs were destroyed by the development of Greater Los Angeles.

=== Mexican land sale ===
In the late 1840s, Mexican Governor Pio Pico broke with the tradition of "granting" land and, instead, sold it, without the usual area limitations, to Eulogio de Celis, a native of Spain. By 1850, de Celis was in the Los Angeles census as an agriculturist, 42 years old, and the owner of real estate worth $20,000.

=== Land division ===
A few years later, the land was split up. The heirs of Eulogio de Celis sold the northerly half – 56,000 acres (230 km^{2}) – to Senator George K. Porter, who had called it the "Valley of the Cumberland" and Senator Charles Maclay, who exclaimed: "This is the Garden of Eden." Porter was interested in ranching; Maclay in subdivision and colonization. Francis Marion ("Bud") Wright, an Iowa farm boy who migrated to California as a young man, became a ranch hand for Senator Porter and later co-developer of the 1,100-acre (4.5 km^{2}) Hawk Ranch, which is now Northridge land.

=== Early community ===
In 1908, the Southern Pacific Railroad laid tracks through the Hawk Ranch property; following this and continuing the pattern of railroad boom towns, the Hawk Ranch was sold for subdivision and was renamed Zelzah in 1910. The name is derived from a biblical name for an oasis as a reference to a water well located in the area. The Zelzah Train Station or Depot was built on the site that is now the northwest corner of Parthenia Avenue and Reseda Boulevard, across the street from the water well. Also in 1910, on January 13, the large balloon America landed on the so-called Zelzah ranch after a 31-mile (50 km) trip from Huntington Park. By April, The Scandia Land and Loan Company was advertising Zelzah Acres with land going for $250 per acre. The company advertised the acres as the "cream of the San Fernando valley, the richest soil in California," describing the ease of transportation provided by the station, the lack of alkali, adobe or hardpan soil, and stating that water for domestic purposes could be welled from 35 to 65 feet and at 140 to 300 feet for general irrigation; water would later become a major selling point for land in the valley after the arrival of the Los Angeles Aqueduct. The initial growth in the region was so marked that discussions of the creation of new school districts were being forwarded to the county school superintendent Mark Keppel, one of these districts being named Zelzah which would benefit 15 children of school age living nine to ten miles from a schoolhouse. By the beginning of 1912, a post office had been established in Zelzah. By April 1913, sales agents E. O. Hanson & Sons were advertising that only 300 of the original 1100 acres were left for sale, by then at $325 an acre.

The first church built in Northridge, the Faith Bible Church, was built in 1917. By the 1920s, the town became a shipping center for agricultural products and continued to be a rural community for many years.

Residents of Zelzah voted to change the community's name to North Los Angeles in 1929. Reseda Boulevard, the main thoroughfare of the community, was paved in 1930.

In 1938, the community's name was changed to the more popular Northridge Village at the suggestion of local resident and director of the Southwest Museum in Los Angeles Carl Denzel; it would later be shortened to just Northridge.

=== Post-war years ===
The community began to develop rapidly after World War II and agricultural lots were subdivided into suburban housing tracts to meet the demand for single-family homes by veterans and their families. Commercial development began to take place in the 1950s; the San Fernando Valley State College was opened in 1956. Light industry moved into the area and spurred a building boom. The train depot was torn down in 1961 and underpasses were constructed below the railway over Reseda Boulevard and Parthenia Street.

== Education ==
Thirty-four percent of Northridge residents aged 25 and older had earned a four-year degree by 2000, an average percentage for the city but high for the county. The percentages of the same-age residents with a bachelor's degree and a master's degree or higher were high for the county.

=== Primary and secondary schools ===
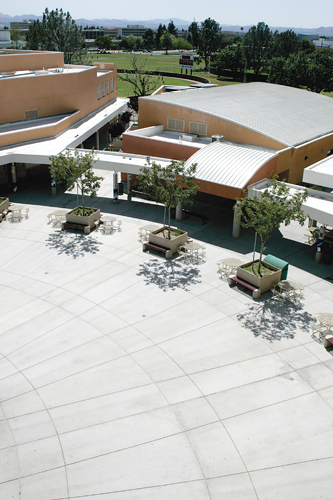
Northridge Academy High School

In 1962, Nobel Junior High School in Northridge became the first air-conditioned school in the Los Angeles Unified School District. The school has since been renamed Nobel Charter Middle School.

In 1982, the board considered closing Prairie Street Elementary School in Northridge. It was located on the California State University, Northridge campus, and that university used Prairie as a laboratory school. In April 1983 an advisory committee of the LAUSD recommended closing eight LAUSD schools, including Prairie Street School. In August 1983 the board publicly considered closing Prairie, which had 280 students at the time. In 1984 the board voted to close the Prairie Street School. In 1985 some parents were trying to have Prairie Street School reopened.

Secondary and lower-grade schools within the Northridge boundaries are:

==== Public ====
- Andasol Avenue Elementary School, 10126 Encino Avenue
- Alfred Bernhard Nobel Middle School, 9950 Tampa Avenue
- Topeka Drive Elementary School, 9815 Topeka Drive
- Balboa Gifted / High Ability Magnet Elementary School, alternative, 17020 Labrador Street
- Northridge Academy High School, 9601 Zelzah Avenue
- Oliver Wendell Holmes Middle School, 9351 Paso Robles Avenue
- Dearborn Street Elementary School, 9240 Wish Avenue
- Calahan Street Elementary School, 18722 Knapp Street
- Napa Street Elementary School, 19010 Napa Street
- Northridge Middle School, 17960 Chase Street
- Parthenia Street Elementary School, 16825 Napa Street
- Granada Hills Charter TK-8, 17081 Devonshire St

==== Private ====
- Casa Montessori, 17633 Lassen Street
- Our Lady of Lourdes, 18437 Superior Street
- Highland Hall Waldorf School, K-12, 17100 Superior Street
- Art of Learning Academy, 9535 Alden Avenue
- St. Nicholas School, elementary, 9501 Balboa Boulevard
- First Presbyterian Church of Granada Hill, elementary, 10400 Zelzah Avenue
- Cornerstone Christian Academy, 11031 Yolanda Avenue
- East Valley Academy, K-12, 20212 Londelius Street
- Abraham Joshua Heschel Day School, Elementary and Middle, 17701 Devonshire Street

=== Colleges ===
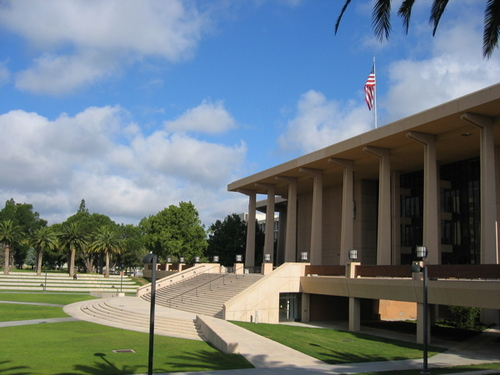
California State University, Northridge

California State University, Northridge, or CSUN, part of the California State University system, offers bachelor's and master's degrees in a number of disciplines. The school is a major producer of K-12 teachers in the region and the nation as a whole. CSUN also has engineering, business, and film programs.

CSUN officially opened in 1956 as San Fernando Valley Campus of Los Angeles State College of Applied Arts and Sciences, on Nordhoff Street and Etiwanda Avenue, land formerly used to grow orange, lemon and avocado groves. Two years later it separated from its parent and became the independent San Fernando Valley State College. By the early 1970s, however, this institution became known as California State University, Northridge. By fall of 2016, CSUN had reached enrollment of almost 40,000 students.

A 2025 study revealed that CSUN is a major contributor to the local economy: nearly $800 million annually. Additionally, CSUN-associated activity supported 13,500 jobs and CSUN alumni supported an estimated 41,600 jobs statewide generating $8.6 billion in economic activity.

== Entertainment ==
=== Motion pictures and television ===
Silent star Janet Gaynor and her costume-designer husband Adrian were the first owners of a spacious estate in Northridge, which was later sold to Barbara Stanwyck and Robert Taylor. Later, actor Jack Oakie owned the property and lived on it. The Oakie house was set for the wrecking ball, but in 2010 the city agreed to buy the Tudor-style stone landmark and its 10-acre (40,000 m^{2}) ranch estate.

Marion Marx, wife of Zeppo Marx, and Barbara Stanwyck started Marwyck Ranch as a horse breeding farm. The original house and a small portion of the ranch still exist, and is managed by the city as Oakridge Estate Park. Northridge was known as the "Horse Capital of the West," with regular Sunday horse shows, annual stampedes, and country fairs.

=== Devonshire Downs ===
In the late 1960s, Devonshire Downs was the site of two major rock music festivals. The little-known two-day 1967 Fantasy Faire and Magic Music Festival (at "Devonshire Meadows") featured The Doors, Jefferson Airplane, Country Joe and the Fish, The Grass Roots, Canned Heat, Iron Butterfly and several other bands. The better-known but confusingly named 1969 Newport Pop Festival was a massive three-day event that featured Jimi Hendrix and many other top acts. It took place in June and was briefly the largest music festival ever held before losing that distinction to Woodstock the following August. Like its famous successor, it had problems with large numbers of gate-crashers, and some young attendees far from home camped out nearby in sleeping bags. Unlike Woodstock, "nearby" included parts of suburban Northridge, where most of the local residents were horrified to find their neighborhoods invaded by "hippies". A ban on rock music festivals soon followed.

== Earthquakes ==
The 1994 Northridge earthquake was named for Northridge based on early estimates of the location of the quake's epicenter; however, further refinements showed it to be technically in neighboring Reseda. The earthquake, which occurred on a blind thrust fault, was one of the strongest ground motions ever recorded in North America. Freeways collapsed, and many buildings suffered irreparable damages. Vertical and horizontal accelerations lifted structures off their foundations. During the 1994 quake, the Northridge Hospital Medical Center remained open and treated more than 1,000 patients who came to the facility during the first few days after the magnitude 6.7 quake.

This was the second time in 23 years that the area had been affected by a strong earthquake. On February 9, 1971, the San Fernando earthquake (also known as the Sylmar earthquake) struck, having a magnitude of 6.5.

== Points of interest ==
- Brent's Deli, famous deli in Northridge
- CSUN Botanic Garden
- California State University, Northridge (CSUN)
- Donald E. Bianchi Planetarium at CSUN
- Northridge Fashion Center, Regional shopping mall.
- Northridge Hospital Medical Center
- Studio 606 West, the recording studio of rock band Foo Fighters
- The US Metric Association is based in Northridge.
- The Younes and Soraya Nazarian Center for the Performing Arts, also known as The Soraya at CSUN.

=== Hospital ===
Northridge Hospital Medical Center consists of a 411-bed hospital and serves 2 million residents of the Valley. The hospital is one of only two facilities in the Valley certified as a trauma center for treating life-threatening injuries.

== Parks, recreation and sports ==
The Northridge Recreation Center, located at 18300 Lemarsh St., has an indoor gymnasium, without weights, which may also be used as an auditorium. Its capacity is 400. The park also has barbecue pits, a lighted baseball diamond, lighted indoor basketball courts, lighted outdoor basketball courts, a children's play area, a community room, picnic tables, a lighted soccer field, and lighted tennis courts. The Northridge Pool, on the recreation center grounds, is an outdoor heated seasonal pool.

Dearborn Park, located at 17141 Nordhoff Street, is an unstaffed, unlocked park has lighted outdoor basketball courts, a children's play area, picnic tables, and lighted tennis courts.

Vanalden Park, located at 8956 Vanalden Ave., is an unstaffed pocket park, has a horseshoe pit, a jogging path, and picnic tables.

== Government and infrastructure ==
=== Local government ===
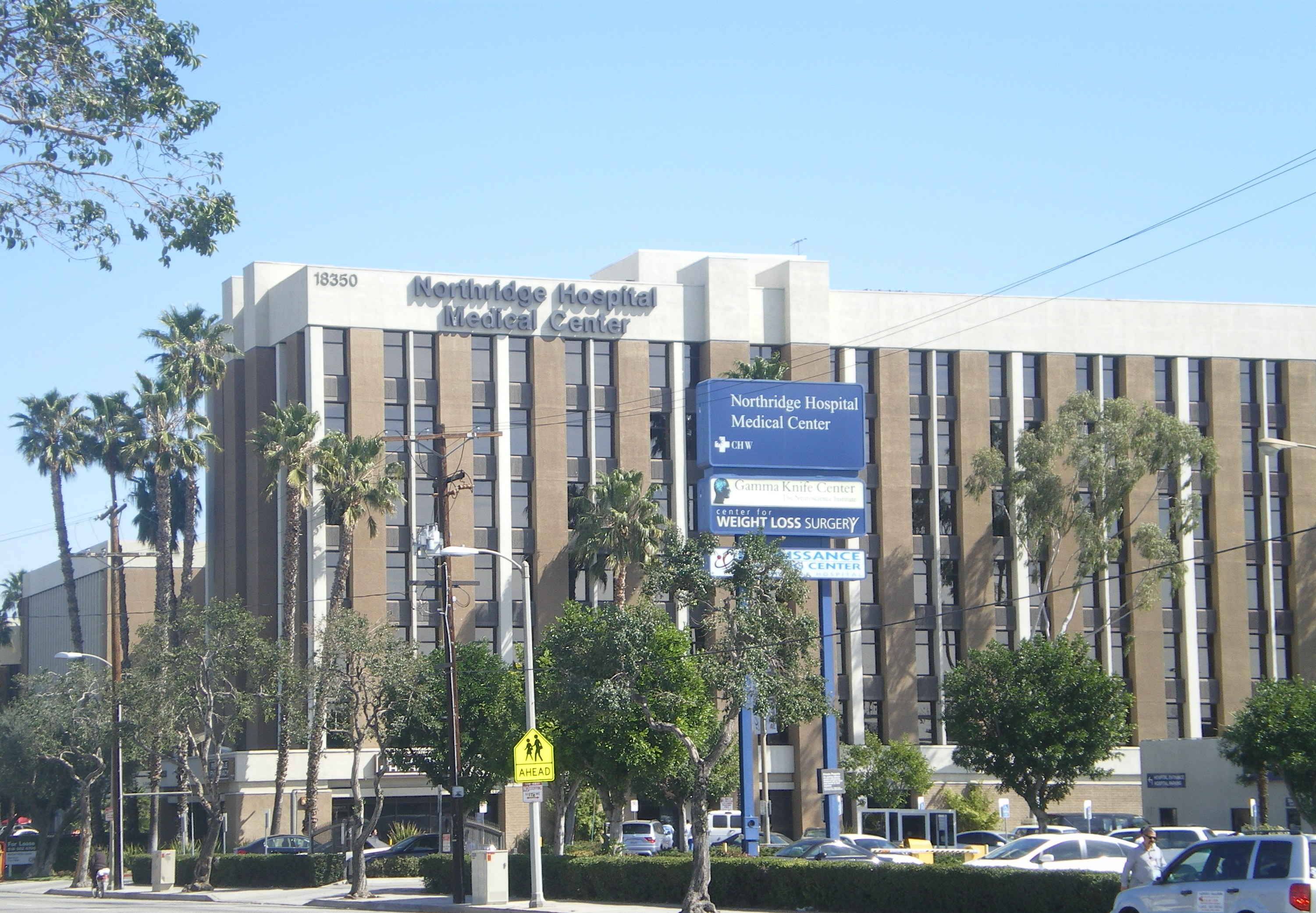
Northridge Hospital Medical Center

Los Angeles Fire Department Station 70 (Northridge) and Station 103 (Northridge/CSUN) serve the community.

City of Los Angeles neighborhood councils that cover Northridge:

- Northridge East Neighborhood Council
- Northridge West Neighborhood Council
- Northridge South Neighborhood Council

The Los Angeles Police Department operates two police stations that serve Northridge:

- Devonshire Community Police Station serves residents north of Roscoe Boulevard.
- West Valley Community Police Station serves residents south of Roscoe Boulevard.

=== County, state, and federal representation ===
The Los Angeles County Department of Health Services operates the Pacoima Health Center in Pacoima, serving Northridge.

The United States Postal Service Northridge Post Office was located at 9534 Reseda Boulevard but closed in 2022 after losing its lease.

- Northridge is represented in the United States Senate by California's Senators Adam Schiff and Alex Padilla as of October 2025.
- In the United States House of Representatives, Northridge is located within California's 32nd congressional district represented by Democrat Brad Sherman.
- In the State Assembly, Northridge is located within California's 40th State Assembly district represented by Democrat Pilar Schiavo.
- In the California State Senate, Northridge is split between California's 20th State Senate district represented by Democrat Caroline Menjivar, and California's 27th State Senate district represented by Democrat Henry Stern.
- Northridge is located within the City of Los Angeles' 12th City Council District represented by Councilmember John Lee.

== Notable people ==
- Brooke Abel, Olympic synchronized swimmer
- Ariane Andrew, professional wrestler
- Hal Bernson, Los Angeles City Council member, 1979–2003
- Bob Brunner, producer and screenwriter
- Champ Butler, singer
- Nancy Cartwright, voice actress, became Honorary Mayor in 2005
- Matt Cassel, professional football
- Jarron Collins, professional basketball
- Jason Collins, professional basketball
- Jim Davis, actor
- Bobbi Fiedler, U.S. Congress member
- Linda Fratianne, figure skater at the 1980 Winter Olympics
- Brian Grazer, film and television producer
- Cole Guttman, ice hockey player
- Jackie Earle Haley, actor
- Mike Houghton, professional football
- Travis Kalanick, co-founder of Uber
- Ryan Kalish, professional baseball
- Antonia Lofaso, celebrity chef
- Casey Matthews, professional football
- Kyle, entertainer
- Clay Matthews, professional football player
- John H. Meier, business adviser to Howard Hughes
- Lynn Carey Saylor, singer, guitarist and composer
- Niecy Nash, actress, comedian
- Bob Skube, professional baseball
- Malcolm Smith, professional football
- Eric Steelberg, cinematographer
- Beatrice Straight, actress
- Brian Vranesh, professional golfer
- Duffy Waldorf, professional golfer
- Jeff Weaver, Major League Baseball
- Jered Weaver, Major League Baseball
- Danny Worth, professional baseball

== See also ==
- Reseda Boulevard
