= Resurrection (Brian May EP) =

Single by Brian May with Cozy Powell

from the album Back to the Light
- B-side: "Love Token"
- Released: 7 June 1993
- Recorded: Sarm
- Length: 4:39
- Label: Parlophone
- Songwriter(s): Brian May, Cozy Powell, Jamie Page
- Producer(s): Brian May, Justin Shirley-Smith

Brian May singles chronology
"Back to the Light" (1992)	"Resurrection" (1993)	"Last Horizon" (1993)

Music video
- "Resurrection" on YouTube

"Resurrection" is a song by Queen's guitarist Brian May from the album Back to the Light. It was released as a fourth single from the album in 1993.

== Overview ==
The single was released as two different CD versions credited to Brian May with Cozy Powell. It charted at number 23 in the UK.

Resurrection was released as a mini-album in Japan putting together B-sides from the single and adding songs from Star Fleet Project, previously released as B-sides to the "Back to the Light" single.

The single was re-released on 16 July 2021 to promote the re-release and remastering of "Back to the Light".

== Track listings ==
12-inch & CD single 1

1. "Resurrection" – 4:39
2. "Love Token" – 5:27
3. "Too Much Love Will Kill You" (live version) – 4:42
  - recorded live at The Palace Theater, Los Angeles, on 6 April 1993

CD single 2

1. "Resurrection" – 4:39
2. "Driven by You Too" – 1:32
3. "Back to the Light" (live version) – 4:51
  - recorded live in Los Angeles for The Tonight Show With Jay Leno, 5 April 1993, performed by the Brian May Band
4. "Tie Your Mother Down" (live version) – 3:30
  - recorded live in Los Angeles for The Tonight Show With Jay Leno, 5 April 1993, performed by the Brian May Band featuring Slash

== Japanese Tour Mini album ==
Resurrection – Japanese Tour Mini Album

EP by Brian May
- Released: 1993 (Japan)
- Genre: Rock
- Label: EMI

=== Track listing ===
1. "Resurrection" – 4:39
2. "Love Token" – 5:27
3. "Too Much Love Will Kill You" (live version) – 4:42
  - recorded live at The Palace theater, Los Angeles, on 6 April 1993
4. "Back to the Light" (live version) – 4:51
  - recorded live in Los Angeles for The Tonight Show With Jay Leno, 5 April 1993, performed by the Brian May Band
5. "Tie Your Mother Down" (live version) – 3:30
  - recorded live in Los Angeles for The Tonight Show With Jay Leno, 5 April 1993, performed by the Brian May Band featuring Slash
6. "Blues Breaker" – 12:50
7. "Star Fleet" – 8:06
8. "Let Me Out" – 7:13
  - tracks 6–8 performed by Brian May & Friends, taken from the mini-album Star Fleet Project
