= Blag =

Blag may refer to:

== Arts and entertainment ==
- Blag, a 2004 novel by Tony Saint
- Sweeney 2: The Blag, a 1978 novel by Alan White as Joe Balham
- "Blag", a 1982 song by Brian May with Smile
- Mr. Blag, a character from The Thick of It
- Blag, a wildebeest character in Disney's The Wild
- Blag, a character from British sitcom Chelmsford 123

== Other uses ==
- Blag, to obtain by deception, to bluff, to scrounge or to rob, a British term not widely used in the United States
- Blag, Tagalog for a falling strike, a cross-linguistic onomatopoeias
- Blag Dahlia (Paul Cafaro, born 1966), American singer and record producer
- BLAG Linux and GNU, an operating system produced by the Brixton Linux Action Group
- Bipartisan Legal Advisory Group, a standing body of the U.S. House of Representatives

== See also ==
- Blagger
- Blog, or web log
