= Yōtōden =

1987 film directed by Osamu Yamasaki

- Cover of the second Yōtōden original soundtrack CD

戦国奇譚妖刀伝 (Sengoku Kidan Yōtōden)
- Genre: Historical fantasy
- Created by: Osamu Yamasaki; Takeshi Narumi
- Original video animation
- Directed by: Osamu Yamasaki; Toshiyuki Sakurai (#1)
- Produced by: Tomoyuki Miyata; Yoshiaki Aihara
- Written by: Takeshi Narumi (#1); Osamu Yamasaki (#2) (Note: While Narumi and Aikawa received a screenplay (脚本) credit, Yamasaki received as dramatiziation (脚色) credit. The distinction between the two is unknown.); Shō Aikawa (#2–3)
- Music by: Seiji Hano
- Studio: MTV; J.C.Staff
- Licensed by: NA: Central Park Media (expired); UK: ADV Films (expired)
- Released: May 21, 1987 – May 11, 1988
- Runtime: 40 – 45 minutes
- Episodes: 3
- Anime film

Wrath of the Ninja
- Directed by: Osamu Yamasaki
- Produced by: Tomoyuki Miyata; Yoshiaki Aihara
- Written by: Shō Aikawa
- Music by: Seiji Hano
- Studio: MTV; J.C.Staff
- Licensed by: NA: Central Park Media (expired); UK: ADV Films (expired)
- Released: May 27, 1989
- Runtime: 86 minutes
- Manga
- Written by: Takeshi Narumi
- Illustrated by: Kenichi Ohnuki
- Published by: Kadokawa Shoten
- Magazine: Newtype
- Original run: September 1989 – September 1990
- Volumes: 1

Yōtōden (戦国奇譚妖刀伝, Sengoku Kitan Yōtōden; "Warring States Story: Tale of the Spirit Blades") is a 3-episode Japanese original video animation produced by J.C.Staff, the studio's first production. In 1989, Yōtōden was re-edited into a feature film version titled Wrath of the Ninja for English-speaking regions, but is currently out of print. A manga adaptation was serialized in Newtype.

== Plot ==
The story takes place during Japan's great civil war Sengoku period, beginning in the summer of 1581 and ending two years later. In the anime, the historical warlord Oda Nobunaga is really an evil demon killing everyone who stands in his way. An ancient prophecy says three mystical Demon Blades from three different ninja clans can end Nobunaga's unholy campaign. The story follows Kasumi no Ayanosuke, a young kunoichi (female ninja) who has escaped her village's annihilation, in her heroic efforts to reunite these three sacred weapons and use them to kill Nobunaga.

== Characters ==
=== Protagonists ===
Ayanosuke (Ayame) Hayami
Voiced by: Keiko Toda (Japanese); Rose Markisello (English)
The sole survivor of Kasumi village, burnt down in an attack by a huge three-headed demon monster. Her Demon Blade is a kodachi short sword. Ayame (she transformed the feminine name "Ayame" (綾女) into "Ayanosuke" (綾之介) after her village was destroyed) is a strong fighter but gets emotional at times. She is the only survivor of the final battle at Azuchi Castle, left all alone in the world again.
Sakon Hayate
Voiced by: Kazuhiko Inoue (Japanese); Chris Orbach (English)
The sole survivor of Hyuga village, wiped out by Nobunaga's forces. His Demon Blade is a katana sword. Sakon is calm and puts on a facade of coolheadedness, but when he abandons Ayame and Ryoma to fight the battle between Iga and Nobunaga's army, he is raging with inner turmoil at his decision. Later, he develops a loving bond for Ayame and ultimately takes the mortal blow meant for her, but as he dies saying he had something to tell her, he cannot remember what it is.
Ryoma Kogure
Voiced by: Takeshi Watabe (Japanese); Peter Patrikios (English)
A headstrong ninja who has a good sense of right and wrong. His Demon Blade is a halberd. He leaves his father to his death at his request during the demon invasion of his home village Hagakure, as well as witnesses the death of his sister Kikyo, killed by Jinnai, and is forced to kill his love interest Kayo Momochi. When he dies, his last thoughts are about his sister.
Kikyo Kogure
Voiced by: Mika Takenaka (Japanese); Sharon Becker (English)
Ryoma's younger sister who befriends and admires Ayame and tries to comfort her when she was upset and reminiscing about her tragic past. Kikyo dies in Ayame's arms after she shields her from Jinnai's final attack with her own body.
Lord Tanba Momochi
Voiced by: Tomomichi Nishimura
Kayo's older brother who leads the Iga into the war. He sacrifices himself by trying to kill his sister, begging her to die with him when her body is possessed by the Masago.
Jinpei
Voiced by: Masami Kikuchi (Japanese); Frank Frankson (English)
A young shinobi who looks up to Sakon and supports Sakon's claims that Koga betrayed Iga (not believed by Momochi), but refuses to abandon his people and leave with Sakon. He is blinded and killed during the attack on Iga.
Genyusai
Voiced by: Kiyoshi Kobayashi (Japanese); Greg Wolfe (English)
Ryoma's father and lord of Hagakure. He is killed in Jinnai's attack on his village.
Shinnosuke Hayami
Voiced by: Kei Tomiyama
Ayame's brother who was killed in the attack on their village. Before he died, Shinnosuke gave her the enchanted blade to avenge them.

=== Antagonists ===
Nobunaga Oda
Voiced by: Kazuki Yao (Japanese); Flavio Romeo (English)
The adversary of the main characters. He used to be a ruler of a small region of Owari, until, as it is revealed during the showdown between Mori Ranmaru and Ayame in the final part of the OVA series ("Flames of Anger"), Ranmaru gave him control of the kagenin (shadow warriors) of the Host of Oboro and the power of the demons to conquer whole Japan. Nobunaga commands the host of Oboro, but unknowingly to him, he is, in turn, himself controlled by Ranmaru and is unaware that he is the most powerful of the Oboro, the Black Demon. In the anime, Oda doesn't die after Akechi Mitsuhide betrayed him at Honnō-ji and where Ayame and Sakon kill only his and Ranmaru's body doubles. Nobunaga is very paranoid that someone will kill him, and as Ranmaru feeds that paranoia he distrusts everyone so much that he has his own guards killed. In the end, he becomes the Black Demon but is killed by Ayame using the combined powers of their weapons.
Ranmaru Mori
Voiced by: Kaneto Shiozawa (Japanese); Vinnie Penna (English)
In the anime, Ranmaru, an advisor to Nobunaga, is a powerful demon who has descended upon the Earth five centuries earlier in 946 from a piece of the passing-by evil star (comet). Thinking he will gain ultimate power, Oda follows all of the advice Ranmaru gives him, tricking Nobunaga into allowing him to rule the Earth. Ranmaru is the one who foretold the prophecy and gave the enchanted weapons to the ninja groups in first place, manipulating everyone including not only Nobunaga and the heroes but even all the other Oboro for his master plan to gather negative human emotions (that was what powered the magic weapons) through the weapons and combine them with the power of the Oboro to form the Black Demon. He attempts to open the gate to the underworld when the returning evil star is closest to the Earth but is killed by the combined efforts of Ayame, Sakon and Ryoma, the latter two, however, sacrifice their own lives for the victory.
Jinnai Saegusa
Voiced by: Norio Wakamoto (Japanese); Bruce Winant (English)
Jinnai is the first Oboro ninja to appear in the anime, using a necklace of giant beads in combat. His demon form is a huge three-headed monster. He comes back later at Hagakure-no-Sato and attempts to kill Ayame, but fails and accidentally ends up killing Kikyo instead and is then himself killed by Ayame.
Masago "The Silk Spinner"
Voiced by: Reizô Nomoto
Masago is able to cause the people's heads to explode and to transform into a spider monster. He is killed by Ryoma, but not before he possesses Kayo and causes her to kill her own comrades and her brother at Iga.
Kagami
Kagami is childlike in appearance and has the ability to reanimate corpses as undead warriors with her crying and also carries a little ball that she can detonate. During the final battle she manages to severely wound Ryoma, but then she herself meets her death at his hands.
Kiheiji "The Quiet Doom"
Voiced by: Shōzō Iizuka (Japanese); Nick Sullivan (English)
Khiheji is an extremely quick fighter, skilled with his spear/scythe weapon, and this makes him a tough adversary for Ayame and Sakon until he is eventually killed by Sakon.
Genzo "The Harpist"
Voiced by: Ritsuo Sawa
Genzo uses genjutsu (illusion magic) against his foes. His demon form is a dragon. He is killed by Sakon in the OVA version and by Ayame in the movie version.

=== Other characters ===
Ryoan
Voiced by: Eken Mine (Japanese); Jack Taylor (English)
A Buddhist monk who doesn't know he is actually one of the Host of Oboro. He is actually helpful to Ayame, Sakon, and Ryoma, guiding them throughout the story and helping with his chants until he is impaled and killed by Ranmaru.
Kayo Momochi
Voiced by: Miho Yoshida (Japanese); Shannon Conley (English)
A female ninja for whom Ryoma has an unrequited crush. She is a representative of the Koga ninja clan and actually Momochi's younger sister, sent away to Koga when she was young. Kayo is one of the most tragic characters in the story, as her body is possessed by Masago, forcing Ryoma to kill her at her own request.

== OVA ==
The series was released in three episodes from 1987 to 1988 in Japan only on VHS and videodisc formats; a laserdisc version was also released in 1990. The OVA series had been not licensed in the west until 2002, when it was released in the UK by ADV Films on VHS. In 2006 the series was also released on DVD by U.S. Manga Corps under the title Wrath of Ninja - The Complete Yotoden Saga.

== Film ==
The compilation movie version of Yōtōden was cut together by MTV Japan and released cinematically, premiering at Ikebukuro Theater on May 27, 1989, with VHS and videodisc home releases coming out the following month in August. This version is 45 minutes shorter than the OVA series. A special laserdisc version was also released in Japan only in 1990, containing four new scenes. It has been released in the US by U.S. Manga Corps on VHS in 1998 as Wrath of the Ninja: Yotoden, and on DVD in 1999 and 2003 as Wrath of the Ninja: The Yotoden Movie. Another American DVD version was released in 2009 by Anime Cartoon DVD RSP as Wrath of the Ninja without a sub-title.

== Manga ==
The Yōtōden manga was published after the anime and ran for a year (September 1989 - September 1990) in the Japanese magazine Newtype, later also published in a book form in 1991 and in Kadokawa Newtype 100% Comics in 1992. The manga differs from the anime in some significant ways (including the introduction of the new character Kagome), but the main characters remain the same.

== Other ==
Other media and items for the series included two soundtracks released on CD by Victor Musical Industries, Inc. in 1987–1988, two artbooks, a line of collectible phone cards, and a large number of minor merchandise such as calendars, posters, postcards, etc.

== Reception ==
The OVA series achieved enormous success in Japan upon its initial release, including being voted by the readers of Gakken's animation magazine AnimeV as the best OVA in both 1987 and 1988. Ayame was also voted the best female character, and Sakon won the first place for two constructive years in the category best supporting character. According to a 1997 review by EX, "For a complex, intelligent, and entertaining historical period anime, YOTODEN remains difficult to beat."

== Sources ==
- *fire*rain*: Altar: Hayate no Sakon
- Sakon no Miko's Yotoden Hall
- 戦国奇譚妖刀伝 (in Japanese)
