= Reizō Nomoto =

Japanese voice actor (1930–2006)

- 野本礼三
- Born: Reijiro Nomoto; September 17, 1930; Tokyo, Japan
- Died: July 7, 2006 (aged 75)
- Occupation: Voice actor
- Years active: 1954–2006
- Agent: Arts Vision

Reizō Nomoto (野本礼三, Nomoto Reizō), (born Reijiro Nomoto (野本礼次郎, Nomoto Reijiro); September 17, 1930 – July 7, 2006) was a Japanese voice actor from Tokyo who was affiliated with Arts Vision.

== Death ==
On July 7, 2006, Nomoto vomited blood at home and was taken to a hospital, where he died from unknown causes at the age of 75.

== Filmography ==
=== Anime ===
- Blocker Gundan 4 Machine Blaster (Zangyakku)
- City Hunter (Yotagawa)
- Dokaben (Ieyasu Tokugawa)
- Dragon Ball GT (Rou Dai Kaioshin)
- Dragon Ball Z (Rou Dai Kaioshin)
- Esper Mami (role unspecified)
- Ganso Tensai Bakabon (role unspecified)
- GeGeGe no Kitaro 1985 (role unspecified)
- GeGeGe no Kitaro 1996 (role unspecified)
- Genesis Climber Mospeada (Pierrot)
- Gyakuten Ippatsu-man (role unspecified)
- Hurricane Polymar (role unspecified)
- The Kabocha Wine (role unspecified)
- Kaibutsu-kun (Dr. Noh)
- Karasu Tengu Kabuto (Jaki)
- Karate Baka Ichidai (role unspecified)
- Lightspeed Electroid Albegas (Officer Daim, principal)
- Meiken Jolie (role unspecified)
- Mooretsu Atarou (role unspecified)
- O-bake no... Holly (Yabukofu)
- Obake no Q-Tarō (Kaminari-san)
- Perrine Monogatari (role unspecified)
- Robokko Beeton (Noble-san)
- Science Ninja Team Gatchaman (role unspecified)
- Sentimental Journey (Wakana's grandfather)
- Takarajima (Tom Morgan)
- Tekkaman: The Space Knight (role unspecified)
- Tensai Bakabon (role unspecified)
- Time Bokan (role unspecified)
- Wansa-kun (role unspecified)

=== OVAs ===
- Adventure Kid (Doctor Masago)
- Blue Seed Beyond (Tomezo)
- Legend of Crystania (old man)
- Ushio and Tora (old man)
- Wizardry (old beggar, tavern owner)

=== Films ===
- Doraemon: What Am I for Momotarō? (Villager)
- Doraemon: Nobita's Dorabian Nights (Minion)
- Ninja Scroll (Mushizou)
- Porco Rosso (role unspecified)
- Yōtōden (Kira no Masa)

=== Video games ===
- Genei Tōgi: Shadow Struggle (Han Fei Lan)

=== Miscellaneous ===
- X-Bomber (Kozlo)
- Gosei Sentai Dairanger (Baron String (Eps. 1–2), Count Kaleidoscope (Ep. 36), New Gorma-Monster (Ep. 50))
- Gosei Sentai Dairanger Movie (Baron String/Great King Ojaru (Voice of Kenichi Ishii and Miyuki Nagato, Hideaki Kusaka, Nobuyuki Hiyama))
- Juukou B-Fighter (Mercenary Bardas) (Ep. 8)

=== Dubbing ===
- Creepshow 2 (The Hitchhiker (Tom Wright))
- The New Adventures of Batman (Penguin)
