= Blagger =

Blagger or blaggers may refer to:

- Blagger (video game)
- Blaggers ITA, formerly The Blaggers, a British punk rock band 1988–1996
- one who blags, a British term not widely used in the United States
- blagging, a social engineering term sometimes used to refer to pretexting

== See also ==
- Blag (disambiguation)
