= X-Bomber =

Japanese marionette tokusatsu TV series

- Cover for the Remastered DVD-Box set
- Also known as: Star Fleet; Bomber X Bombardero X Vegskip X Sternenflotte; Zero Zero One
- Genre: Tokusatsu, Science fiction, Fantasy
- Created by: Go Nagai
- Developed by: Keisuke Fujikawa
- Written by: Keisuke Fujikawa (eps 1-25)
- Directed by: Michio Mikami
- Voices of: Toshio Furukawa; Shigeru Chiba; Mami Koyama; Banjo Ginga; Hidekatsu Shibata; Mikio Terashima; Naoki Tatsuta; Norio Wakamoto; Reizo Nomoto; Rihoko Yoshida; Katsuji Mori; Yūji Mitsuya
- Narrated by: Yuzuru Fujimoto
- Theme music composer: Kyoji Yamamoto
- Opening theme: Soldier in the Space
- Ending theme: The Drifting Galaxy
- Country of origin: Japan
- Original language: Japanese
- No. of seasons: 1
- No. of episodes: 25 (24 in UK version)

Production
- Executive producers: Kimio Ikeda; Keisuke Fujikawa
- Producer: Kimio Ikeda
- Camera setup: Ryuji Kawasaki
- Running time: 22–26 minutes

Original release
- Network: Fuji TV (Japan); ITV (UK); Syndication (United States)
- Release: 4 October 1980 – 28 March 1981

X Bomber (Ｘボンバー, Ekkusu Bonbā) (released as Star Fleet in the UK) is a Japanese marionette tokusatsu TV series created by manga artist Go Nagai, and produced by Cosmo Productions and Jin Productions. The show aired on Fuji TV from October 4, 1980, to March 28, 1981, with a total of 25 episodes (including the pre-series pilot episode), and was billed in Japan as being filmed in "Sūpāmariorama" (スーパーマリオラマ), a puppeteering process similar to Gerry Anderson's Supermarionation works.

== Production information ==
The show's opening and ending theme songs ("Soldier in the Space" and "The Drifting Galaxy", respectively) were performed by the Japanese hard rock group Bow Wow, while Kazutaka Tazaki (of The Bach Revolution) and Nakayuki Sakuraba (of Adbaloon) provided additional music for the show.

The puppets of X-Bomber were controlled from below the set using rods, and as a consequence were generally seen only from the waist up. Whereas Gerry Anderson's series were episodic in nature, X-Bomber had an overall story arc, with sub-plots and new characters being introduced as the series progressed, leading to a definite end. Similarly, rod puppets were used in Gerry Anderson's 1967 series Captain Scarlet and the Mysterons canned as "under-control" puppets due to their inability to walk-whereas everywhere else they were marionettes. Anderson would later use Rod puppets in Terrahawks.

== Star Fleet ==
X-Bomber was dubbed by English speaking actors and renamed Star Fleet for broadcast in the United Kingdom on ITV. The show was broadcast there on Saturday mornings, first airing on October 23, 1982, the day before Star Wars aired for the first time on British television. Due to its broadcast slot, the advertisements shown before, during and after each episode frequently included children's Public Information Films. The series was also broadcast as such on first-run syndication in the United States.

Drawing heavily on diverse influences such as Star Wars, Japanese Anime and Gerry Anderson's various "Supermarionation" series, the show ran for twenty-four half-hour episodes (twenty-five in Japan - the eighteenth episode, titled Bloody Mary's Promotion, was not included in the English version, as it consisted mainly of flashbacks). The English version's theme song was composed by Paul Bliss, and was later covered by Queen member Brian May and Van Halen guitarist Eddie Van Halen. This was released under the name "Star Fleet Project".

The screenplay was adapted for English by Michael Sloan, who in later years would create the popular TV series The Master and The Equalizer.

Actress Denise Bryer ("Commander Makara") and editor Tony Lenny both went on to collaborate with Gerry Anderson and Christopher Burr making another memorable sci-fi series, Terrahawks.

== Synopsis ==
The year is 2999. Earth is at peace following the Space Wars. The safety of the human race is ensured by Earth Defense Force (EDF). Shortly before the turn of the fourth millennium, the peace is broken by the appearance of a gigantic alien battle cruiser. Powerless to defend itself, the EDF's Pluto base is completely destroyed and the evil Commander Makara reveals that the same fate awaits the Earth unless the mysterious F-Zero-One is handed over to her.

Unaware of the nature of F-Zero-One and fearing retribution, the EDF presses into action an untested, incomplete weapon, codenamed X-Project, from its hidden moonbase. The X-Project is revealed to be a powerfully-armed spacecraft named X-Bomber.

The series then follows the adventures of the crew of the X-Bomber, namely Doctor Benn, Shiro Hagen, Barry Hercules and John Lee who are joined by PPA, Lamia and her guardian Kirara. They set off to discover the nature of the F-Zero-One and try to protect it from the increasingly desperate Commander Makara and her menacing overlord, the Imperial Master.

It is revealed that Lamia herself is the mysterious F-Zero-One, a powerful alien destined to bring peace to the galaxy at the turn of the millennium. The series continues with Lamia gradually discovering her true nature and powers while the Imperial Alliance attempts to capture her and destroy the X-Bomber. The series climaxes with the X-Bomber crew destroying Commander Makara and Lamia finally confronting and defeating the Imperial Master and bringing peace to the universe.

== Episodes ==
No.	Title	Directed by	Original release date	English air date	English Episode No.
SP	"Super Space Machine X Bomber - Takeoff Preparation Complete (TV Pilot Presentation)" (超宇宙マシーンＸボンバー 発進準備完了 (chō uchū mashīn X bonbā hasshin junbi kanryō))	Unknown	October 4, 1980	n/a	n/a
1	"Scramble, X-Bomber" (スクランブル・Xボンバー (sukuranburu X bonbā))	Michio Mikami	October 11, 1980	October 23, 1982	1
2	"Super Powerful Imperial Alliance Fleet" (奇襲ゲルマ艦隊! (kishū geruma kantai!))	Michio Mikami	October 18, 1980	-	2
3	"Find F-01!" (F-01を探し出せ! (F-01 o sagashidase!))	Michio Mikami	October 25, 1980	-	3
4	"Wipe Out the Transport Fleet" (輸送船団消滅す! (yusō sendan shōmetsu su!, The convoy disappears!))	Akira Takahashi	November 1, 1980	-	4
5	"The Mysterious Ship Skull!" (謎の帆船ドクロ号! (nazo no hansen dokuro gō!, Mysterious Fleet Skull Team))	Akira Takahashi	November 8, 1980	-	5
6	"X-Bomber Goes Forth!" (旅立つXボンバー! (tabidatsu X bonbā!)))	Michio Mikami	November 15, 1980	-	6
7	"Mortal Combat In The Gravity Graveyard!" (重力墓場の死闘! (jūryoku hakaba no shitō!))	Michio Mikami	November 22, 1980	-	7
8	"An Attack Beyond Tears!" (涙を越えて銃撃せよ! (namida o koete jūgeki seyo!))	Michio Mikami	November 29, 1980	-	8
9	"Target: the Commander" (追いつめられた司令官! (oitsumerareta shireikan!))	Michio Mikami	December 6, 1980	-	9
10	"Galaxy Adrift" (銀河漂流 (ginga hyōryū))	Michio Mikami	December 13, 1980	-	10
11	"Farewell, the Eternal Battlefield" (サヨナラ永遠の戦場! (sayonara eien no senjō!))	Akira Takahashi	December 20, 1980	-	11
12	"Our Mortal Enemy Is Captain Carter" (宿敵はカスター大尉 (shukuteki wa kasutā taii))	Akira Takahashi	December 27, 1980	-	12
13	"Battle To The Death: X Bomber Vs. the Imperial Alliance" (激闘! Xボンバー対ゲルマ軍団 (gekitō! X bonbā tai geruma gundan, Fierce fighting! X Bomber vs. Germa Legion))	Michio Mikami	January 3, 1981	-	13
14	"Lamia, Girl Of Destiny" (宿命の少女ラミア (shukumei no shōjo ramia))	Akira Takahashi	January 10, 1981	-	14
15	"X-Bomber: Death on Planet M" (XボンバーM星に死す! (X bonbā M boshi ni shisu!))	Michio Mikami	January 17, 1981	-	15
16	"Lamia Kidnapped" (連れ去られたラミア (tsuresarareta ramia))	Michio Mikami	January 24, 1981	-	16
17	"Asleep In The Ice Prison" (氷の牢獄で眠れ! (kōri no rōgoku de nemure!))	Noriyasu Ogami	January 31, 1981	-	17
18	"Bloody Mary's Promotion!" (ブラディマリー昇進! (buradi marī shōshin!))	Noriyasu Ogami	February 7, 1981	not shown	n/a
19	"Destroy the Prison Planet" (牢獄惑星を爆破せよ! (rōgoku wakusei o bakuha seyo!))	Kiyotaka Matsumoto	February 14, 1981	-	18
20	"F-01 Assassination Plot" (F-01暗殺作戦 (F-01 ansatsu sakusen))	Kiyotaka Matsumoto	February 21, 1981	-	19
21	"Callanean: Full Frontal Attack Begins!" (M13総攻撃開始! (M13 sōkōgeki kaishi!))	Kiyotaka Matsumoto	February 28, 1981	-	20
22	"Callanean: A Battle with No Tomorrow" (M13明日なき戦い! (M13 ashita naki tatakai!, M13 Battle Without Tomorrow))	Kiyotaka Matsumoto	March 7, 1981	-	21
23	"Board the Imperial Alliance Mothership" (ゲルマ母艦へ突入せよ! (geruma bokan e totsunyū seyo!))	Noriyasu Ogami	March 14, 1981	-	22
24	"The End of Earth" (地球絶体絶命! (chikyū zettaizetsumei!))	Michio Mikami; Noriyasu Ogami	March 21, 1981	-	23
25	"A New Beginning For the Galaxy" (銀河新世紀元年 (ginga shinseiki gannen))	Michio Mikami; Noriyasu Ogami	March 28, 1981	April 16, 1983	24

Some Episodes for the English version of the series were either renamed to fit the changes made or badly translated from the original titles. Although the episodes were not officially named during the original series' run, the English DVD release confirms their titles.

== Voice cast ==
Cast
Character	Japanese voice	English dub character name	English voice
Shiro Ginga	Toshio Furukawa	Shirō Hagen	Jay Benedict
Bongo Heracles	Shigeru Chiba	Barry Hercules	Constantine Gregory
Bigman Lee	Naoki Tatsuta	John Lee	Mark Rolston
Dr. Benn Robinson	Mikio Terashima	Dr. Benn Robinson	Peter Marinker
Lamia	Mami Koyama	Princess Lamia	Liza Ross
P P Adamsky	Yuji Mitsuya	PPA (Perfectly Programmed Android)	John Baddeley
General Kuroda	Hidekatsu Shibata	General Kyle	Kevin Brennan
Captain Custer	Norio Wakamoto	Captain Carter	Garrick Hagon
Bloody Mary	Rihoko Yoshida	Commander Makara	Denise Bryer
Lieutenant Kozlo	Reizo Nomoto	Captain Orion	Sean Barrett
Emperor Gelma	Takashi Tanaka	The Imperial Master	Jacob Witkin
Doctor Gedora	Kenichi Ogata	Caliban	Al Matthews (and Professor Hagen uncredited)

The English cast list of Star Fleet was relatively small, with most voice actors doing the extra voices in the series as well. Credits were only made based on the main characters who appeared in the first episode, with the credits being reused each episode afterwards. As a result, Al Matthews was uncredited from his role later in the series.

Three of the English-language voice actors (Benedict, Rolston and Matthews) would later appear in the 1986 sci-fi horror film Aliens.

== Crew ==
- Planned and Produced by Kimio Ikeda and Keisuke Fujikawa
- Created by Go Nagai
- Serialized in Shogakukan's TV-Kun and Other Learning Magazines
- Written by Keisuke Fujikawa
- Music by Bow Wow, Kazutaka Tasaki and Nobuyuki Sakuraba
- Theme Songs "Soldier in the Space" and "Galaxy Drifting"
- Lyrics by Keisuke Fujikawa
- Music Kyoji Yamamoto
- Arranged by Bach Revolution
- Performed by Bow Wow
- Directed by Michio Mikami, Akira Takahashi, Kiyotaka Matsumoto and Noriyasu Ogami

== Staff ==
- Camera Operator: Ryuji Kawasaki
- Lighting Cameraman: Yoichi Takahashi
- Production Designers: Akira Takahashi, Kyoko Heya and Shinichi Noro
- Puppets Operator: Fumiaki Hayashi
- Assistant Directors: Kiyotaka Matsumoto, Tetsuhiro Matori and Tadaaki Kozen
- Audio Director: Sadayoshi Fujino
- Scripter Girl: Yoshiko Hori
- Editor: Yoshihiko Yamamoto (Araki Prod.)

== Visual effects unit ==
- Directors of Visual Effects Kiyotaka Matsumoto and Yasumasa Abe
- Director of Photography Yasumasa Abe
- Lighting Masao Tsuchida
- Art Director Minoru Ohashi
- Practical Effects GIVS
- Assistant Director Hitoshi Ueda
- Compositing by Japan Visual Creation

== Post production ==
- Sound Effects: Fizz Sound Creation
- Co-Ordinator: Kunio Kuwahara
- Recorded at: NEWJAPAN Studio
- Audio Produced by: Omnibus Promotions
- Assistant Producer: Masahide Baba
- Production Manager: Fumio Takahashi
- In Charge Of Production: Ikubun Cai
- Film Processing: Tokyo Processing Offices
- Produced by: Fuji Television, Jin Productions and Cosmo Productions

== English dubbing ==
- Executive Producer: Kevin Morrison
- Produced and Directed by: Louis Elsman and Peter Marinker
- Written by: Michael Sloan
- Music: Paul Bliss
- Co-Ordinator: Annie Wallbank
- Assistant Producer: Nicola Thurgood
- Supervising Editor: Tony Lenny
- Dialogue Editor: Roy Taylor
- Assistant Editing: Roy Helmrich and Bryan Tilling
- Dialogue Synchronization: Maggie Dickie
- Sound Recordist: Doug Hurring
- Recorded at: Anvil Studios
- Sound Effects: Theatre Three Productions and Cinesound Effects Library
- Prints: Rank Film Laboratories
- Titles: G.S.E. Ltd.
- Produced by: Leah International and ITV 1
- Distributed by: Itoman And Company

== French dubbing (1983) ==
- Presented by Intercine TV
- Written by: Alain Gedovius
- Music: Shuki Levy and Haim Saban
- French Version: MPS
- Recorded at: Auditorium Ltc.

== In comics ==
Two relatively unknown manga were also created in 1980. One was drawn by Naoki Kamohara and published in the magazine Monthly Shōnen Jump by Shueisha from June 1980 to August 1980 and the other was drawn by Makoto Ono in the magazine TV-kun by Shogakukan from November 1980 to April 1981.

British comic magazine Look-In ran strips based on Star Fleet for 32 weeks beginning in January 1983.

== Home video ==
The original Japanese version of the series was released in its entirety in a LaserDisc-box in 1993 and by Pioneer LDC in a DVD-box set in November 29, 2002. Both sets also contained one of two compilation movies created from Star Fleet, in English with Japanese subtitles. Both sets have since gone out of print. On April 24, 2013, Bandai Visual released a Remastered DVD-Box of the series featuring enhanced and remastered scenes.

In Bulgaria The Thalian Space Wars and Space Quest For F-01 tapes were released by Multi Video Center with Bulgarian dub.

In the US, eight video tapes were released which also contained compilations of the series' episodes, albeit in a less-drastically edited format.

In the UK, only three Star Fleet video tapes were ever released. The first and rarest contained episodes 4 and 5 of the series. The other two were compilation movies entitled The Thalian Space Wars and Space Quest For F-01. The series has not been repeated on UK television since the late 1980s.

A DVD set of Star Fleet was released in the UK on February 9, 2009, by Fabulous Films. Included in the DVD set are all 24 episodes, remastered, and restored to their original UK broadcast format. Beyond the episodes, the set also includes stills and a double-sided poster, as well as a comicbook and a comprehensive 'making of' documentary, which includes contributions from series creator Go Nagai, Dr Benn voice artist Peter Marinker, Brian May, Paul Bliss and Gerry Anderson.

Further to the DVD release, Paul Bliss' soundtrack has been released on CD and is available via mail order.

Discotek Media announced in June 2016 that they will release the dubbed series on DVD in the United States on December 20, 2016. It was later delayed for a February 2017 release. They later announced in January 2019 that they will release both that version and the original version on SD Blu-ray in the United States on March 26, 2019.
