= Star Fleet (song) =

Single by Brian May

from the album Star Fleet Project
- Released: 24 October 1983
- Recorded: 21 & 22 April 1983
- Genre: Hard rock
- Length: 8:08 (album version); 4:12 (single version)
- Label: EMI (Europe), EMI / Capitol (U.S.)
- Songwriters: Paul Bliss, Brian May
- Producer: Brian May

Brian May singles chronology
"Star Fleet" (1983)	"Driven by You" (1991)

"Star Fleet" is the debut solo single by English musician Brian May, the lead guitarist of Queen. It is taken from the end theme of the cult science fiction puppet series Star Fleet.

It was also taken from the mini-album Star Fleet Project, which started out as a jam session involving May, Eddie Van Halen, drummer Alan Gratzer, bassist Phil Chen and keyboardist Fred Mandel over the days 21 and 22 April 1983.

Aside from the main participants, the title track also included drums and backing vocals by Queen drummer Roger Taylor.

The main track, "Star Fleet", was edited down from the mini-album's length of eight minutes to a more radio-friendly 4:12. Shorter edits were also done for Argentinian and American promo releases. The British B-side, "Son of Star Fleet", is an instrumental consisting mainly of the sections edited out of the full version of the track for its single release.

== Track listing ==
UK 7" Single

1. "Star Fleet" (Single Version) (Bliss) 4:12
2. "Son of Star Fleet" (May) 4:23

US 7" Single

1. "Star Fleet" (Single Version) (Bliss) 4:12
2. "Star Fleet" (US Promo Edit) (Bliss) 3:07

== Personnel ==
- Brian May - guitar, vocals, production
- Eddie Van Halen - guitar, backing vocals
- Alan Gratzer - drums
- Phil Chen - bass guitar
- Roger Taylor - backing vocals, drums
- Fred Mandel - keyboards
- Reinhold Mack - mixing
- Mike Beiriger - engineering
- Nick Froome - additional engineering
