= Lynn Carey Saylor =

American singer, guitarist and composer

- Genres: Pop, rock, AAA
- Occupation: Musician
- Years active: 2000s–present
- Label: Skip Saylor Recording
- Website: www.lynncareysaylor.com

Lynn Carey Saylor (born September 19) is an American singer, guitarist and composer. She is most known for her recording work with Queen guitarist Brian May, and her remake of the 1984 Pat Benatar hit "We Belong", which was recorded for and released on her 2007 album, You Like It Clean.

== Biography ==
=== Early years ===
Saylor was born in San Diego, California and raised in Las Vegas, Nevada. The first instrument she played was violin, then piano, then moved to guitar in her early teens. She writes songs on both piano ("If We Believe") and guitar, but most often guitar. She is known for being bright and scholastic, as she skipped a grade in school and was a high school graduate by the age of 16. Lynn studied music theory at the now defunct Dick Grove School of Music and she is also a college graduate, with a Bachelor of Arts in Communications and a minor in Music. She has been a member of the Screen Actors Guild since the mid-1990s with bit parts in movies and television commercials to her credit. She is married to Skip Saylor.

=== Singing career ===
2002 was the year of her first commercial musical release, a limited edition charity single of the song "If We Believe", which features Brian May, guitarist of Queen on guitar and backing vocals. Lynn donated a portion of the proceeds of sales of the single to the Mercury Phoenix Trust, an AIDS charity founding by the surviving members of Queen and their manager following the untimely AIDS related death of Queen front man, Freddie Mercury, in 1991.

In 2006, she remade the 1984 Pat Benatar hit "We Belong", working again with Brian May of Queen, and also with both Eric Lowen and Dan Navarro, the writers of "We Belong", who all appear on her version of the song. Saylor's rendition is considered to be the most dynamic and rock oriented version of the song ever recorded.

In early 2007, her full-length album "You Like It Clean" was released independently. It features "We Belong", a remixed and new vocal version of "If We Believe" and 9 other cuts written entirely by Lynn. Other notable musicians on this album include Stacy Jones (drums) and Jamie Arentzen (guitarist for American Hi-Fi), Chris Johnson (worked with Evanescence), Frank Gryner, producer/programmer to artists such as Tommy Lee and Rob Zombie, Danny Miranda (of Blue Öyster Cult), Sasha Krivtsov, former touring bassist for such artists as Vanessa Carlton and Billy Idol, and drummer Mark Schulman, who has toured or recorded with Cher, Foreigner, Pink, Stevie Nicks, and Sheryl Crow.

== Awards ==
She is the winner of four 2005 Online Music Awards, for: Best collaboration - Lynn Carey Saylor, Brian May for "If We Believe", Best Female Vocal (an overall award), Best Song - "If We Believe", Best Cover Art "If We Believe" (Limited Edition single).

Lynn's song "102 (Songs About You)" was a 2008 finalist in the prestigious International Songwriting Competition in the Country category. 15,500 songs were entered into the competition in 2008 from 80 Countries. "102 (Songs About You)" also garnered an honorable mention nod in the Billboard World Song Contest in 2009 and in 2010, the song was released on artist Charissa Mrowka's debut EP on Guitar Girls Records, an independent record label formed by Saylor. In 2011, Saylor was awarded finalist status in two major songwriting contests for the song "Long Slow Kiss" - the UK Songwriting Contest in the "Love Songs" category and again in the Country category of the SongDoor International Songwriting Competition.

== Discography ==
- "If We Believe", featuring Brian May of Queen (single) 2002
- "You Like It Clean" (full-length album) 2007

Lynn Carey Saylor also appears as a background singer on the Pacific Music Award-winning album of the year, Much Love by the New Zealand-based band, Spacifix (2006).
