= Star Fleet Project =

1983 EP by Brian May + Friends

EP by Brian May + Friends
- Released: 31 October 1983
- Recorded: 21–22 April 1983
- Studios: The Record Plant, Los Angeles
- Genres: Hard rock; blues rock
- Length: 28:11
- Label: Capitol
- Producer: Brian May

Brian May chronology
Star Fleet Project (1983)	Back to the Light (1992)

Singles from Star Fleet Project
- 1. "Star Fleet" Released: 24 October 1983

Star Fleet Project is a solo project of Brian May, Queen's guitarist, and a mini-album of the same name. Released as the work of Brian May + Friends, the album features May, guitarist Eddie Van Halen, drummer Alan Gratzer (then of REO Speedwagon), Phil Chen (session bassist who played with Jeff Beck and Rod Stewart), and Fred Mandel (keyboard player for Alice Cooper and additional keyboard player on Queen's Hot Space Tour and The Works). "The result is high-octane rockist instrumentals, instantly Queenish, and not unlike Flash with added fretboard pyrotechnics". The tapes were not intended to be released and received minimal mixing. "Star Fleet Project was called a 'mini-album' by [May] because he thought it ... too short to be a proper album, but too long to be even an EP single".

The EP was re-released along with a collection of other session recordings and alternate takes titled Star Fleet Sessions on 14 July 2023.

== Production ==
The idea for the album came from May's son Jimmy, a fan of Star Fleet, the English title of Japanese sci-fi puppet TV show X-Bomber. The show, which aired on Saturday mornings, "was compulsive regular viewing for [May] and his 4-year-old son Jimmy ... inspiring [May]'s attachment to its title song". "It was my little boy who really got me keen on it. He said, 'Daddy, Daddy, get up, it's time for Star Fleet!' I had to rush out of bed and tumble downstairs and we used to watch it. I was very keen on the music and a couple of verses at the end, and I thought, 'One day I should do something because it would be great.' And I could hear it buzzing around in my head the way I wanted to do it." "[M]y little boy had been watching this science fiction series and I always thought that the theme tune for it would be a great vehicle for all-out guitar playing". "And [Jim] said, 'Daddy, you should play that!', and I thought, 'Actually, that's a rather good piece of music!'" "If [composer] Paul [Bliss] hadn't written a very catchy song as the theme tune for that kid's TV science fiction drama series, things would have been different," said May. "The signature tune began to stick in my head, and I could hear my own arrangement of the tune developing in my mind. But how to record it?"

There was a seven-month period between when May watched the show with his son and the mini-LP's recording. "We were all in a little bit of downtime in our own projects. Queen was in a bit of a hiatus, and I think Van Halen weren't doing too much and my neighbour [in Los Angeles] Alan Gratzer from R.E.O. [Speedwagon] wasn't doing much and we got together". "I just played [the theme tune] to them, and they were all people who I liked as friends and people who I admired as musicians, and I made a little demo I'd done on acoustic guitar and made a little demo tape of how I wanted it to be and they said 'Great, that sounds fine, let's try.'" Recorded on 21 and 22 April 1983 at the Record Plant Studios, Los Angeles, California, the mini-album was released in October that same year. The record consists of three songs: "Star Fleet", "Let Me Out", and "Blues Breaker". The album name apparently comes from the title track: "Because one song was called 'Star Fleet', [May] dubbed the jam session ... Star Fleet Project".

"Star Fleet", May's hard-rock arrangement of the Star Fleet theme tune with "extended soloing", "soars on more sheer guitar power as the piece is translated into interstellar heavy metal", with heavy emphasis on May's and Van Halen's guitar work, as May "intended to provide a platform for Van Halen's soloing skills with ... Star Fleet". The "strongest" track, the song "[carries] both the energy and full flavor of an early Queen work". "Van Halen's and May's guitar solos bounce off one another like playful lions". This "[bouncing] off one another" is intended, as May explained: "I wanted to play in a sympathetic way to him, to supply the great rhythms that he could play to. I wanted to be the perfect rhythm guitarist, and I grew up as a rhythm guitarist, so that's natural to me. But when we were trading solos ... we were feeding off each other .... We'd never played together before, and yet the chemistry is there. It was as spontaneous as anything could be". "Edward played the solo on 'Star Fleet' three times. Each time it was incredible. Each time it was different". Prior to beginning work on the project, May "attempted to get in touch with the song's writer, British keyboardist Paul Bliss, but was unsuccessful until after the Star Fleet Project was completed." Of this attempted contact, May said, "I tried to get in touch with the guy who had written the song, Paul Bliss, and couldn't at the time. So I pressed on and did some arrangement around a couple of verses and wrote extra middle bit for it. Later I got in touch with him, and he said it was a pity that I couldn't find him in the early days because he's got some more verse in the middle – which I'm dying to hear – but it was too late for the project. My song does follow his musical theme, and I used the verse he wrote." Apparently "Brian sent a signed copy of the finished [mini-album] to ... Bliss, with a message thanking him for his composition".

"Let Me Out", "an old song of [May's] which found new life", "turns into a blues jam, with Brian and Van Halen trading licks". "[Not as] structured", the song "does carry a nice, bluesy swagger". During this song, "Edward tortures his top string to its audible death and winds up quite naturally on the remaining five". The song "received its first live performance on 7 December 1990 at the Astoria Theatre, when Brian guest-starred on guitar for the last four minutes of The Cross' Fan Club gig ....[and got] one additional airing on 7 July 2001 at [the Auditorium Stravinksi] as part of the Montreux Jazz Festival), with Brian on guitars and vocals, Jon Clearly on piano, Chris Spedding on guitar, John Hatton on bass, Bernie Dresel on drums, and Emily [May], [Jim May], and Anita [Dobson] providing backing vocals." "Queen fans may enjoy the piano blues 'Let Me Out' best, as it sounds like it would have fit right in on News of the World. I can imagine Freddie putting his spin on it quite easily. Brian takes the first solo, but next time he says 'Help me, Edward!' and it's Van Halen playing the blues .... Brian and [Edward] alternate, and then [Edward] blazes the fretboard shredder style." The song "wouldn't have sounded out of place on a Queen album ... [and] there are ... some Queen-esque vocal harmonies on the chorus".

"Blues Breaker", "a 13-minute piece of improvisation highlighted by the attacks and counter-attacks of May and Van Halen", "a masterpiece ... for its pure spontaneity", is a "long blues jam (edited together from several recorded that day), with no lyrics or vocals .... The liner notes dedicate this piece to E. C. (Eric Clapton), and that's where the name comes from." "[W]hen we started ... the Blues Breaker track, I think we kind of had Eric Clapton in our minds and the people that Clapton would revere like [B.B.] King, Muddy Waters; it was the power of the blues which made us gel. I remember [Edward] saying, 'You know, you got me to play today in a way that I haven't played for years.' Just simple and from the heart and with that kind of feeling." Heavy metal magazine Kerrang! said that the song "has something epic, as if every one of the players touched deep into [the] collective music lexicon, and promptly replied to his previous speaker." This song and "Let Me Out" were more spontaneous than "Star Fleet", with May showing off his signature sound and Van Halen using his unique tapping technique to great effect. "May sent ... 'Blues Breaker' to Eric Clapton, who reportedly found the song to be not terribly bluesy. [Edward Van Halen] was greatly disappointed." More than finding the song "not terribly bluesy", Clapton took insult from the song, finding it horrible. "May was on the defensive when he talked about 'Bluesbreaker', a lengthy jam dedicated to Eric Clapton, which took up all of side two: 'It seemed very indulgent putting out a long jam, but having listened to it, I think it's worthwhile ... it's rock blues with all the mistakes left in.'" "Van Halen throws in some tapping and rapid runs as the track progresses whilst May ... keeps it simple but effective .... Fred Mandel gets a piano solo spot ... before the track double-times for the final bars." On the types of guitarists he liked at the time, May told Dave Heffernan in an interview for RTE: "I prefer the kind of people like Jeff Beck or, I mean still Clapton and still Hendrix, I'm very ... maybe call me old-fashioned, I don't know, but also say, Edward Van Halen."

On the mini-album as a whole, Van Halen said:

That was just a get-together jam. [May] invited me down to ... Record Plant and we played .... After we played, he called me up about four months later and asked what I thought about putting the stuff out. And I said, "Send me the tape, let me hear it first," because I didn't remember how it went. He did and said, "Sure, what the hell." It reeks of fun.

== Releases ==
The project was originally released on Halloween, 31 October 1983, and was later re-released in November of that year.

Capitol released "[a] shorter edit of 'Starfleet' ... [a] move [which] proved to be a disaster".

Star Fleet Project was released on two CD formats. It was first re-issued as part of May's "Back to the Light" single, in two CDs: the first featured "Star Fleet" and "Let Me Out", the second "Blues Breaker".

In 1993, the songs were re-issued as tracks 6–8 of the Japanese mini-album Resurrection.

== Reception ==
Professional ratings
Review scores
Source	Rating
MusicHound Rock	3/5 stars

Although the album did not do well initially—by the end of the year it reached No. 35 in the UK and No. 125 in the US, with the "Star Fleet" single being counted as "a non-starter at 65" that "received no daytime radio airplay", individuals took a liking to the mini-LP—so much so that by 1984, it was reported that the album was "already a cult guitar favorite. Where solo efforts often tend to be politely applauded and then forgotten as an artist's 'indulgence', the raw power of this album has given it instant, unanticipated acceptance .... [May admitted:] 'I must contest I still enjoy it — I still put it on the record player and like what I hear.'" "[O]n this album May is able to let loose and allow his blues influences to show through .... [T]he expert musicianship shows through in such a way that makes [the album] worth purchasing." "[T]here is so much spirited byplay among ... May and ... Van Halen ... Alan Gratzer ... Phil Chen and ... Fred Mandel that [the mini-album] was just too good to be left sitting in the can." Star Fleet Project was voted Best Spontaneous Recording by Hope College in 1984. In a televised interview with Roger Taylor, also in 1984, May's "interest in [Star Fleet had become] quite well known", to the point where it was openly referenced in a televised interview as an introduction to the 'Star Fleet' music video. The titular song "lived on – at the conclusion of 'One Vision' on the 1986 Magic tour, [Queen] launched into the ascending false conclusion [of 'Star Fleet'] before [going] into 'Tie Your Mother Down'." This occurred at Råsundastadion and Wembley. By 1993, general perception of the mini-album was favorable, as Joe Kleon wrote in Scene magazine: "[May] has appeared in many projects, including the highly-acclaimed 'Star Fleet Project' released in 1983 with [Edward] Van Halen." Referencing Star Fleet Project in comparison to the Ultima Thule Mix of May's song New Horizons, Rolling Stone journalist Kory Grow wrote that "May's first-ever solo recording was also a tribute to space travel."

== Re-release ==
In late 2021, May stated that Star Fleet Project would be re-released following re-releases of Back to the Light and Another World. "I'm going to do Star Fleet, which is the one with Eddie Van Halen, after that." Following Van Halen's death on 6 October 2020, May stated that "[a]t some point it would be lovely to revisit [Star Fleet Project] in depth, but at the moment I'm not. It doesn't feel right now."

On the order of re-releases, May explained, "I didn't want to do [Star Fleet] first, because I wanted to put my proper solo album out first .... I'll do [Back to the Light] first, Another World and then the third one will be Star Fleet." Another World was re-released on 22 April 2022. As of late November 2022, the re-release process had begun, with May stating that he had begun "'working on the Star Fleet box set, which is number 3 in the Brian May Gold Series, and probably to be released halfway into next year.'" May additionally admitted, "I was never fond of the original mix of 'Star Fleet', the single, so we cleaned that up. Now, EVH's sound is larger than life. You'll hear the development of Eddie's solo, which I always thought was one of the greatest things he did ... a real immortal classic of Ed Van Halen pieces." This re-release is set to include "'every take of every song,' along with conversations, outtakes and musical experimentation recorded during the sessions."

On 1 June 2023, May announced the official re-release was available for preorder, and would be released worldwide on 14 July 2023, days before his 76th birthday. The digital single "Star Fleet" was released on 1 June 2023. The 14 July release, titled Star Fleet Sessions, includes "a spectacular 23-track CD filled with previously unreleased material. Containing 2 CDs, 1 vinyl LP, and a vinyl single, as well as other collector's items."

As part of the marketing for the re-release, May uploaded two videos to his YouTube channels, one promoting the preorder, another of the digital version of "Star Fleet".

== Merchandising ==
At least two black long sleeve t-shirts with a yellow Star Fleet star was manufactured, one of which May owned and wore on multiple occasions throughout the 1980s. In November or December 1983, May wore his shirt during an interview about Star Fleet Project with The Saturday Show's Scott G. Reilly, and had another shirt in his lap. There was a Star Fleet-themed quiz as part of the day's program, the winner had to know Dai-X's name to win a copy of the mini-album, a Star Fleet video cassette tape, and a Star Fleet shirt.

With the re-release of Star Fleet Project in 2023, new merchandise was produced and sold, some of it drawing from previous merchandise, such as a cassette tape of the project, long-sleeve shirt, and multiple vinyl records, as well as original designs for tee shirts—such as one with the Red Special and Frankenstrat crossed—and a mug.

== Track listing ==
Star Fleet Project track listing
No.	Title	Writer(s)	Length
1.	"Star Fleet"	Paul Bliss/arr. Brian May	8:04
2.	"Let Me Out"	May	7:13
3.	"Blues Breaker"	May/Edward Van Halen/Alan Gratzer/Phil Chen/Fred Mandel	12:48

== Personnel ==
- Brian May – guitar, vocals, production, keyboards
- Edward Van Halen – guitar, backing vocals
- Alan Gratzer – drums
- Phil Chen – bass guitar
- Fred Mandel – keyboards
- Roger Taylor – drums, backing vocals on "Star Fleet", added and mixed at SARM Studios
- Mack – mixing
- Mike Beiriger – engineering
- Nicholas Froome – additional engineering

== Charts ==
Chart performance for Star Fleet Project
Chart (1983)	Peak position
UK Albums (Official Charts)	35
US Billboard 200	125

Chart performance for Star Fleet Sessions
Chart (2023)	Peak position
German Albums (Offizielle Top 100)	20
Japanese Albums (Oricon)	23
Japanese Hot Albums (Billboard Japan)	32
Scottish Albums (Official Charts)	3
Swiss Albums (Schweizer Hitparade)	23
UK Albums (Official Charts)	35
US Top Album Sales (Billboard)	69
