= List of entertainment events at Madison Square Garden =

Madison Square Garden in New York City has played host to many local, regional and international artists, spanning a wide range of musical genres.

== 1960s ==
1967

Entertainment events at Madison Square Garden
Date	Nationality	Artists	Tours	Supporting Acts	Attendance	Box office
October 19	United States	Frank Sinatra				

1968

Entertainment events at Madison Square Garden
Date	Nationality	Artists	Tours	Supporting Acts	Attendance	Box office
February 11	United States	Bing Crosby/Bob Hope				
July 17	United States	B.B. King				
November 2	United Kingdom	Cream	Wheels Of Fire Tour			

1969

Entertainment events at Madison Square Garden
Date	Nationality	Artists	Tours	Supporting Acts	Attendance	Box Office
January 24	United States	The Doors	—N/a	The Staple Singers	—N/a	
May 18	United States	Jimi Hendrix Experience	—N/a	Buddy Miles Express; Cat Mother and the All Night Newsboys	—N/a	
July 4	United States	James Brown	—N/a		—N/a	
July 11	United States	Wilson Picket Joe Tex Flip Wilson			—N/a	
July 12	United Kingdom	Blind Faith		Delaney & Bonnie; Free	—N/a	
August 7	United States	Little Richard			—N/a	
August 7	United States	Joan Baez			—N/a	
October 10	United States	Herb Alpert & the Tijuana Brass			—N/a	
October 18	United Kingdom	Donovan			—N/a	
November 27	United Kingdom	The Rolling Stones	1969 North American Tour	B.B. King; Terry Reid	—N/a	
November 28	United Kingdom	The Rolling Stones	1969 North American Tour	B.B. King; Terry Reid	—N/a	
December 5	United States	Johnny Cash	—N/a	Carl Perkins	—N/a	
December 19	United States	Janis Joplin	—N/a	Paul Butterfield Blues Band; Johnny Winter	—N/a	

== 1970s ==
1970

Entertainment events at Madison Square Garden
Date	Nationality	Artists	Tours	Supporting Acts	Attendance	Box Office
January 10	United States	Jerry Lee Lewis				
January 28	Canada; United States	Blood, Sweat & Tears; Band of Gypsys; Mother Earth; The Rascals	Winter Festival for Peace	Harry Belafonte; Dave Brubeck; Judy Collins; Richie Havens; Peter Paul & Mary		
February 13	United States	Sly & the Family Stone		Grand Funk Railroad Richard Pryor Fleetwood Mac		
February 23	United States	Ray Charles		B.B. King		
May 13	United States	Creedence Clearwater Revival	—N/a	Booker T & the MG's; Wilbert Harrison		
June 12	United Kingdom	Tom Jones		Gladys Knight and the Pips; Norm Crosby; Count Basie Orchestra	22,000 / 22,000	
June 13	United Kingdom	Tom Jones		Gladys Knight and the Pips; Norm Crosby; Count Basie Orchestra	22,000 / 22,000	
July 25	United States	Miles Davis				
September 19 (2 Shows)	United Kingdom	Led Zeppelin	1970 North American Summer Tour	—N/a		$100,000
October 16	United States	The Jackson 5	1st National Tour	—N/a		
October 30	United States	Little Richard				
November 13	United Kingdom	Ten Years After	—N/a	Brethren; Buddy Miles		
November 26	United States	Sly & the Family Stone		Rare Earth Gladys Knight & the Pips		
November 27	United States	Sly & the Family Stone		Rare Earth Gladys Knight & the Pips		
November 28	United States	Johnny Winter	Johnny Winter And			
November 30	United States	Chuck Berry				
December 4	United States	Johnny Cash		Carl Perkins		
December 18	United States	Grand Funk Railroad		Humble Pie		

1971

Entertainment events at Madison Square Garden
Date	Nationality	Artists	Tours	Supporting Acts	Attendance	Box Office
February 6	United States	The Temptations				
February 7	United States	Carl Perkins Bo Diddley				
March 5	United States	Three Dog Night Stevie Wonder		Bloodrock		
March 10	United States	James Taylor				
June 11	United States	Jerry Lee Lewis				
June 12	United States	Tom Jones			22,000	
July 16	United States	The Jackson 5	2nd National Tour	Commodores		
July 30	United States	Stephen Stills	Memphis Horns Tour		21,000 / 21,000	
August 1 (2 Shows)	—N/a	The Concert for Bangladesh		—N/a	40,000 / 40,000	—N/a
September 3	United Kingdom	Led Zeppelin	1971 North American Tour	—N/a		
September 8	United States	Sly & the Family Stone		—N/a		
September 9	United States	Sly & the Family Stone		—N/a		
September 10	United States	Sly & the Family Stone		—N/a		
October 18	United Kingdom	Jethro Tull	—N/a			
October 23	United Kingdom	The Moody Blues	—N/a			
November 12	United Kingdom	Donovan	—N/a			
November 18	United Kingdom	Jethro Tull				
November 25	United Kingdom	Emerson, Lake & Palmer; The J. Geils Band				
November 26	United Kingdom	Faces; Cactus	Bull Augus	—N/a		
December 8	United States	Sly & the Family Stone		—N/a		

1972

Entertainment events at Madison Square Garden
Date	Nationality	Artists	Tours	Supporting Acts	Attendance	Box Office
February 4	United States	Fats Domino				
March 11	United States	David Cassidy				
June 2	United States	The Cleftones; Little Richard; Lloyd Price	Rock & Roll Spectacular Volume IX	Danny & the Juniors; Dion & the Belmonts; The Exciters; Shirley & Lee		
June 9	United States	Elvis Presley	Live at Madison Square Garden	—N/a		
June 10 (2 Shows)	United States	Elvis Presley	Live at Madison Square Garden	—N/a		
June 11	United States	Elvis Presley	Live at Madison Square Garden	—N/a		
June 14	United States	Simon & Garfunkel	Together for McGovern (George McGovern Benefit Concert)	Peter, Paul & Mary; Nichols and May; Dionne Warwicke	18,000–20,000	$400,000
June 23	United States	Smokey Robinson & The Miracles The Four Tops		LaBelle Jr. Walker & The All-Stars		
June 30	United States	The Jackson 5				
July 24	United Kingdom	The Rolling Stones	1972 North American Tour	Stevie Wonder	—N/a	
July 25 (2 Shows)	United Kingdom	The Rolling Stones	1972 North American Tour	Stevie Wonder	—N/a	
July 26	United Kingdom	The Rolling Stones	1972 North American Tour	Stevie Wonder	—N/a	
August 30	United Kingdom	John Lennon	Live in New York City			
September 11	United Kingdom	Faces	—N/a	Rory Gallagher	—N/a	
October 10	United States	Joan Baez	—N/a		—N/a	
October 13	United States	Chuck Berry	—N/a		—N/a	
October 23 (2 Shows)	United Kingdom	The Moody Blues	—N/a		—N/a	
October 27	United States	Shirley MacLaine; Dionne Warwick; Tina Turner and the Ikettes; Mary Travers	Star-Spangled Women for McGovern–Shriver (George McGovern Benefit Concert)	Helen Reddy; Marlo Thomas; Cass Elliot; Gwen Verdon; Chita Rivera; Bette Davis; Melina Mercouri; Judy Collins; with Sue Evans; Linda Hopkins	19,000	$180,000
November 13	United Kingdom	Jethro Tull	Gentle Giant			
November 23	United States	Sly & the Family Stone				
December 8	United Kingdom	Jethro Tull				
December 23	United States	Grand Funk Railroad				
December 29	United States	Roy Orbison				

1973

Entertainment events at Madison Square Garden
Date	Nationality	Artists	Tours	Supporting Acts	Attendance	Box Office
January 7	United States	War				
January 23	Canada; United States	Neil Young; Stray Gators	Times Fades Away Tour	Linda Ronstadt		
March 2	United States	Little Richard				
May 29	United Kingdom	Humble Pie		Black Oak Arkansas		
May 31	United States	John Denver				
June 1	United States	Little Richard; Wilson Pickett	Rock and Roll Revival Spectacular	Chuck Jackson; The Flamingoes; Chantels; Platters		
June 3	United States	Alice Cooper		Flo & Eddie		
June 14	United States	Chicago		Bruce Springsteen		
June 15	United States	Chicago		Bruce Springsteen		
June 16	United States	Johnny Winter		Foghat		
June 27	United Kingdom	The Searchers Hermans Hermits		Billy J Kramer		
July 20	United States	Allman Brothers Band				
July 21	United States	Allman Brothers Band				
July 22	United States	The Jackson 5	The Jackson 5 World Tour	Commodores		
July 27	United Kingdom	Led Zeppelin	1973 North American Tour	—N/a		
July 28	United Kingdom	Led Zeppelin	1973 North American Tour	—N/a		
July 29	United Kingdom	Led Zeppelin	1973 North American Tour	—N/a		
August 28	United Kingdom	Jethro Tull		—N/a		
August 29	United Kingdom	Jethro Tull		—N/a		
September 23	United Kingdom	Elton John				
October 12	United States	Little Richard Fats Domino				
October 26	United Kingdom	The Moody Blues				
November 22	United States	Loggins & Messina				
November 30	United States	The J. Geils Band		Brownsville Station		
December 7	United States	Sly & The Family Stone		Earth, Wind & Fire		
December 17	United Kingdom	Emerson, Lake & Palmer		Stray Dog		
December 18	United Kingdom	Emerson, Lake & Palmer		Stray Dog		
December 19	United States	The Beach Boys				

1974

Entertainment events at Madison Square Garden
Date	Nationality	Artists	Tours	Supporting Acts	Attendance	Box Office
January 5	United States	Little Richard				
January 30	United States	Bob Dylan	1974 Tour			
January 31 (2 Shows)	United States	Bob Dylan	1974 Tour			
February 18	United Kingdom	Yes	Tales from Topographic Oceans Tour	John Martyn	—N/a	
February 20	United Kingdom	Yes	Tales from Topographic Oceans Tour	John Martyn	—N/a	
March 13	United Kingdom	Deep Purple	Machine Head World Tour	Savoy Brown; Tucky Buzzard	—N/a	
March 25	United States	Stevie Wonder			—N/a	
April 13	United Kingdom	Ten Years After			—N/a	
April 22	United States	Grand Funk Railroad			—N/a	
May 13	United Kingdom	Ten Years After	—N/a	ZZ Top		
June 1	United States	Johnny Winter	—N/a	10cc		
June 5	United States	Sly & the Family Stone	—N/a	Eddie Kendricks		
June 7	United States	Little Richard				
June 10	United Kingdom	The Who	1974 Tour	Golden Earring		
June 11	United Kingdom	The Who	1974 Tour	Golden Earring		
June 13	United Kingdom	The Who	1974 Tour			
June 14	United Kingdom	The Who	1974 Tour	Montrose		
June 28	United States	The Edgar Winter Group Rick Derringer				
July 13	United Kingdom	Eric Clapton	—N/a			
July 17	United Kingdom	Cat Stevens				
July 19	United Kingdom	David Bowie	Diamond Dogs Tour	—N/a	40,000 / 40,000	
July 20	United Kingdom	David Bowie	Diamond Dogs Tour	—N/a	40,000 / 40,000	
July 27	United States	The Jackson 5	The Jackson 5 World Tour	Ohio Players, M-D-L-T Willis		
September 14	United States	Chuck Berry		Danny & the Juniors		
September 20	United States	John Denver				
September 21	United States	John Denver				
October 12	United States	Frank Sinatra	The Main Event			
October 13	United States	Frank Sinatra	The Main Event	—N/a	~20,000	—N/a
October 14	United Kingdom	Rick Wakeman				
October 28	United States	Chicago				
November 20	United Kingdom	Yes		Gryphon		
November 21	United States	The Beach Boys				
November 28	United Kingdom	Elton John	Caribou	Kiki Dee	—N/a	
December 6	United States	Stevie Wonder				
December 19	United Kingdom; India	George Harrison; Ravi Shankar	1974 North American Tour	—N/a		
December 20 (2 Shows)	United Kingdom; India	George Harrison; Ravi Shankar	1974 North American Tour	—N/a		

1975

Entertainment events at Madison Square Garden
Date	Nationality	Artists	Tours	Supporting Acts	Attendance	Box Office
February 3	United Kingdom	Led Zeppelin	1975 North American Tour			
February 7	United Kingdom	Led Zeppelin	1975 North American Tour			
February 12	United Kingdom	Led Zeppelin	1975 North American Tour			
February 24	United Kingdom	Faces	—N/a	Blue Öyster Cult	—N/a	
March 7	United Kingdom	Jethro Tull	War Child Tour			
March 10	United Kingdom	Jethro Tull	War Child Tour			
March 14	United States	Jerry Lee Lewis				
May 5	United States	Alice Cooper	Welcome to My Nightmare Tour	—N/a		
May 30	United Kingdom	Bad Company	Straight Shooter Tour	Maggie Bell		
June 12	United States	Chicago	Chicago VIII Tour	The Beach Boys		
June 13	United States	Chicago	Chicago VIII Tour	The Beach Boys		
June 14	United States	Chicago	Chicago VIII Tour	The Beach Boys		
June 15	United States	Chicago	Chicago VIII Tour	The Beach Boys		
June 22	United Kingdom	The Rolling Stones	1975 North American Tour	Eagles; The Gap Band; Rufus & Chaka Khan; Billy Preston	—N/a	
June 23	United Kingdom	The Rolling Stones	1975 North American Tour	Eagles; The Gap Band; Rufus & Chaka Khan; Billy Preston	—N/a	
June 24	United Kingdom	The Rolling Stones	1975 North American Tour	Eagles; The Gap Band; Rufus & Chaka Khan; Billy Preston	—N/a	
June 25	United Kingdom	The Rolling Stones	1975 North American Tour	Eagles; The Gap Band; Rufus & Chaka Khan; Billy Preston	—N/a	
June 26	United Kingdom	The Rolling Stones	1975 North American Tour	Eagles; The Gap Band; Rufus & Chaka Khan; Billy Preston	—N/a	
June 27	United Kingdom	The Rolling Stones	1975 North American Tour	Eagles; The Gap Band; Rufus & Chaka Khan; Billy Preston	—N/a	
August 3	United Kingdom	Jethro Tull	Minstrel In The Gallery Tour		—N/a	
August 4	United Kingdom	Black Sabbath	Sabotage Tour	Aerosmith		
August 16	United States	Parliament-Funkadelic	Mothership Connection Tour			
August 30	United States	Graham Central Station				
October 7	United Kingdom	Rick Wakeman	King Arthur Tour			
October 24	United States	The Isley Brothers				
October 31	United States	Eagles	One of These Nights Tour	Doobie Brothers; Poco; Outlaws		
November 11	Mexico	Angelica Maria	—N/a			
November 21	United Kingdom	Dave Mason	Split Coconut Tour	Peter Frampton		
November 27	United States	The Allman Brothers Band	Win, Lose or Draw Tour			
November 28	United States	The Allman Brothers Band	Win, Lose or Draw Tour			
December 3	United Kingdom	Black Sabbath	Sabotage Tour	Aerosmith		
December 8	United States	Bob Dylan	Rolling Thunder Revue			

1976

Entertainment events at Madison Square Garden
Date	Nationality	Artists	Tours	Supporting Acts	Attendance	Box Office
March 4	United Kingdom	Cat Stevens	Majikat Earth Tour			
March 5	United Kingdom	Cat Stevens	Majikat Earth Tour			
March 11	United Kingdom	The Who	The Who Tour 1976	The Steve Gibbons Band	19,500 / 19,500	$162,000
March 12	United States	Fats Domino		Little Anthony & The Imperials Lesley Gore		
March 24	United Kingdom	Robin Trower	—N/a	Wishbone Ash	—N/a	
March 26	United Kingdom	David Bowie	Isolar Tour	—N/a	20,000 / 20,000	$200,000
April 5	United Kingdom	Bad Company	Run With the Pack Tour	Kansas	—N/a	
May 3	United States	Paul Simon		Phoebe Snow The Brecker Brothers Jimmy Cliff	—N/a	
May 10	United States	Aerosmith	Rocks Tour	Ted Nugent	—N/a	
May 24	United Kingdom; United States	Paul McCartney and Wings	Wings Over The World Tour	—N/a	—N/a	
May 25	United Kingdom; United States	Paul McCartney and Wings	Wings Over The World Tour	—N/a	—N/a	
August 1	United States	Ted Nugent				
August 10	United Kingdom	Elton John	—N/a			
August 11	United Kingdom	Elton John	—N/a			
August 12	United Kingdom	Elton John	—N/a			
August 13	United Kingdom	Elton John	—N/a			
August 15	United Kingdom	Elton John	—N/a			
August 16	United Kingdom	Elton John	—N/a			
August 17	United Kingdom	Elton John	—N/a			
September 10	United States	ZZ Top				
September 25	United States	The Isley Brothers				
October 1	United States	Frankie Valli & The Four Seasons				
October 8	United Kingdom	Peter Frampton	Frampton Comes Alive!			
October 9	United Kingdom	Peter Frampton	Frampton Comes Alive!			
October 10	United Kingdom	Peter Frampton	Frampton Comes Alive!			
November 11	United States	John Denver	—N/a	Starland Vocal Band	—N/a	
November 12	United States	John Denver	—N/a	Starland Vocal Band	—N/a	
December 6	United Kingdom	Black Sabbath	Technical Ecstasy Tour	Ted Nugent	—N/a	
December 16	United States	Aerosmith	Rocks Tour	Rick Derringer	—N/a	

1977

Entertainment events at Madison Square Garden
Date	Nationality	Artists	Tours	Supporting Acts	Attendance	Box Office	
February 5	United Kingdom	Queen	A Day at the Races Tour	Thin Lizzy	19,600 / 19,600	$145,000	
February 11	United Kingdom	Electric Light Orchestra					
February 18	United States	Kiss	Rock & Roll Over Tour	Sammy Hagar	19,600 / 19,600	$145,000	
February 23	United Kingdom	Genesis	Wind & Wuthering Tour	—N/a			
March 18	United States	Eagles	Hotel California Tour	Jimmy Buffett			
April 19	United States	Boston					
June 2	United States	Chuck Berry					
June 7	United Kingdom	Led Zeppelin	1977 North American Tour				
June 8	United Kingdom	Led Zeppelin	1977 North American Tour				
June 10	United Kingdom	Led Zeppelin	1977 North American Tour				
June 11	United Kingdom	Led Zeppelin	1977 North American Tour				
June 13	United Kingdom	Led Zeppelin	1977 North American Tour				
June 14	United Kingdom	Led Zeppelin	1977 North American Tour				
June 21	United States	Crosby, Stills & Nash					
June 29	United Kingdom; United States	Fleetwood Mac	Rumours Tour	—N/a	35,440 / 35,440	$287,270	
June 30	United Kingdom; United States	Fleetwood Mac	Rumours Tour	—N/a	35,440 / 35,440	$287,270	
July 1	United Kingdom	Pink Floyd	In the Flesh Tour		58,000 / 58,000	$608,000	
July 2	United Kingdom	Pink Floyd	In the Flesh Tour		58,000 / 58,000	$608,000	
July 3	United Kingdom	Pink Floyd	In the Flesh Tour		58,000 / 58,000	$608,000	
July 4	United Kingdom	Pink Floyd	In the Flesh Tour		58,000 / 58,000	$608,000	
July 7	United Kingdom	Emerson, Lake & Palmer	Works Tour '77				
July 8	United Kingdom	Emerson, Lake & Palmer	Works Tour '77				
July 9	United Kingdom	Emerson, Lake & Palmer	Works Tour '77				
July 31	United Kingdom	Bad Company	Burnin' Sky Tour	Climax Blues Band			
August 5	United Kingdom	Yes	Going for the One Tour	Donovan			
August 7	United Kingdom	Yes	Going for the One Tour	Donovan			
August 8	United Kingdom	Yes	Going for the One Tour	Donovan			
August 22	United Kingdom	Peter Frampton	I'm In You Tour				
August 23	United Kingdom	Peter Frampton	I'm In You Tour				
August 24	United Kingdom	Peter Frampton	I'm In You Tour				
August 26	United States	The Isley Brothers					
September 10	United States	Parliament-Funkadelic					
October 14	United States	Chuck Berry; Fats Domino; Danny & The Juniors	Richard Nader's 8th Rock‐and‐Roll Revival	The Angels; Johnny Maestro; Bobby Rydell			
October 17	United Kingdom	Emerson, Lake & Palmer	Works Tour '77				
October 20	United Kingdom	Rod Stewart	Foot Loose & Fancy Free Tour				
October 21	United Kingdom	Rod Stewart	Foot Loose & Fancy Free Tour				
October 28	United States	Chicago	Chicago XI Tour				
October 30	Spain	Julio Iglesias					
November 10	United States	Ted Nugent	Cat Scratch Fever Tour	Rex			
November 24	United States	Earth, Wind & Fire	All 'n All Tour				
November 25	United States	Earth, Wind & Fire	All 'n All Tour				
November 29	United Kingdom	Jethro Tull	Songs From The Wood Tour				
November 30	United Kingdom	Jethro Tull	Songs From The Wood Tour				
December 1	United Kingdom	Queen	News of the World Tour	—N/a			
December 2	United Kingdom	Queen	News of the World Tour	—N/a			
December 14	United States	Kiss	Alive II Tour	Detective	—N/a		
December 15	United States	Kiss	Alive II Tour		—N/a		Piper
December 16	United States	Kiss	Alive II Tour		—N/a		Piper

1978

Entertainment events at Madison Square Garden
Date	Nationality	Artists	Tours	Supporting Acts	Attendance	Box Office
March 3	United States	Sha Na Na; Jay & The Americans; Four Tops; Tommy James & The Shondells	Rock & Roll Spectacular Vol. 24			
March 16	United States	John Denver				
March 17	United States	John Denver				
May 7	United Kingdom	David Bowie	Isolar II – The 1978 World Tour	—N/a	60,000 / 60,000	$900,000
May 8	United Kingdom	David Bowie	Isolar II – The 1978 World Tour	—N/a	60,000 / 60,000	$900,000
May 9	United Kingdom	David Bowie	Isolar II – The 1978 World Tour	—N/a	60,000 / 60,000	$900,000
June 8	United States	Parliament-Funkadelic	Funkentelechy Tour			
June 17	Jamaica	Bob Marley & The Wailers	Kaya Tour	—N/a		
June 28	United States	Kansas	Point Of Know Return Tour	—N/a		
July 22	United States	Crosby, Stills, & Nash	CSN Tour	—N/a		
July 29	United Kingdom	Genesis	...And Then There Were Three... Tour	—N/a		
August 4	United States	The Isley Brothers				
August 21	United States	Bruce Springsteen and the E Street Band	Darkness Tour			
August 22	United States	Bruce Springsteen and the E Street Band	Darkness Tour			
August 23	United States	Bruce Springsteen and the E Street Band	Darkness Tour			
August 27	United Kingdom	Black Sabbath	Never Say Die! Tour	Van Halen	—N/a	
August 29	United States	Boston	Don't Look Back Tour	Sammy Hagar		
August 30	United States	Boston	Don't Look Back Tour	Sammy Hagar		
August 31	United States	Boston	Don't Look Back Tour	Sammy Hagar		
September 6	United Kingdom	Yes	Tormato Tour	—N/a		
September 7	United Kingdom	Yes	Tormato Tour	—N/a		
September 8	United Kingdom	Yes	Tormato Tour	—N/a		
September 9	United Kingdom	Yes	Tormato Tour	—N/a		
September 14	United Kingdom	Electric Light Orchestra	Out Of The Blue Tour	Kingfish Trickster		
September 15	United Kingdom	Electric Light Orchestra	Out Of The Blue Tour	Kingfish Trickster		
September 27	United States	Neil Young & Crazy Horse	Rust Never Sleeps Tour			
September 28	United States	Neil Young & Crazy Horse	Rust Never Sleeps Tour			
September 29	United States	Bob Dylan	1978 World Tour	—N/a		
September 30	United States	Bob Dylan	1978 World Tour	—N/a		
October 8	United Kingdom	Jethro Tull	Heavy Horses Tour	—N/a		
October 9	United Kingdom	Jethro Tull	Heavy Horses Tour	—N/a		
October 11	United Kingdom	Jethro Tull	Heavy Horses Tour	—N/a		
November 9	United States	The Marshall Tucker Band		—N/a		
November 16	United Kingdom	Queen	Jazz Tour	—N/a		
November 17	United Kingdom	Queen	Jazz Tour	—N/a		
November 23	United Kingdom	Foreigner		Golden Earring		
November 24	United States	Aerosmith	Live Bootleg! Tour	Golden Earring	—N/a	
November 27	United Kingdom	The Moody Blues	Octave World Tour	—N/a		
December 7	United States	Styx	Pieces Of Eight Tour	Angel		
December 14	United States	Billy Joel	52nd Street Tour			
December 15	United States	Billy Joel	52nd Street Tour			
December 16	United States	Billy Joel	52nd Street Tour			
December 18	United States	Billy Joel	52nd Street Tour			

1979

Entertainment events at Madison Square Garden
Date	Nationality	Artists	Tours	Supporting Acts	Attendance	Box Office
January 7	United States	Grateful Dead	Shakedown Street Tour			
January 8	United States	Grateful Dead	Shakedown Street Tour			
February 28	United States	Parliament-Funkadelic				
March 15	Mexico; United States	Santana	Santana North American Tour 1979	Eddie Money Al Di Meola	19,600 / 19,600	$171,000
May 7	United Kingdom	The New Barbarians				
May 31	United Kingdom	Supertramp	Breakfast in America Tour	—N/a		
June 5	United Kingdom	Rod Stewart	Blondes 'Ave More Fun Tour			
June 7	United Kingdom	Rod Stewart	Blondes 'Ave More Fun Tour			
June 8	United Kingdom	Rod Stewart	Blondes 'Ave More Fun Tour			
June 9	United Kingdom	Rod Stewart	Blondes 'Ave More Fun Tour			
June 13	United Kingdom	Yes	Tormato Tour			
June 14	United Kingdom	Yes	Tormato Tour			
June 15	United Kingdom	Yes	Tormato Tour			
June 16	Spain	Julio Iglesisas				
June 23		Fania All Stars				
June 26	United States	Village People	Go West Tour			
June 27	United States	Teddy Pendergrass		Alton McClain and Destiny		
June 28	United Kingdom	Bad Company	Desolation Angels Tour	Carillo		
July 21	United States	The Allman Brothers Band	Enlightened Rogues Tour	Atlanta Rhythm Section		
July 24	United States	Kiss	Dynasty Tour	New England		
July 25	United States	Kiss	Dynasty Tour	New England		
August 1	United Kingdom	Peter Frampton	Where I Should Be Tour			
August 4	United States	Ted Nugent	State of Shock	AC/DC		
August 28	United States	Kansas	Monolith Tour	Mahogany Rush		
September 4	United States	Grateful Dead				
September 5	United States	Grateful Dead				
September 6	United States	Grateful Dead				
September 7	United Kingdom	Bee Gees	Spirits Having Flown Tour	Sweet Inspirations	39,364 / 39,364	$376,000
September 8	United Kingdom	Bee Gees	Spirits Having Flown Tour	Sweet Inspirations	39,364 / 39,364	$376,000
September 9	United Kingdom	Bee Gees	Spirits Having Flown Tour	Sweet Inspirations	39,364 / 39,364	$376,000
September 11	United Kingdom	Bee Gees	Spirits Having Flown Tour	Sweet Inspirations	39,364 / 39,364	$376,000
September 12	United Kingdom	Bee Gees	Spirits Having Flown Tour	Sweet Inspirations	39,364 / 39,364	$376,000
September 13	United Kingdom	The Who	1979 Tour	—N/a		
September 14	United Kingdom	The Who	1979 Tour	—N/a		
September 16	United Kingdom	The Who	1979 Tour	—N/a		
September 17	United Kingdom	The Who	1979 Tour	—N/a		
September 18	United Kingdom	The Who	1979 Tour	—N/a		
September 19	United Kingdom United States	MUSE Concerts: Musicians United For Safe Energy 1979	No Nukes Concert	James Taylor Bonnie Rait Graham Nash John Hall The Doobie Brothers Jackson Browne		
September 20	United Kingdom United States	MUSE Concerts: Musicians United For Safe Energy 1979	No Nukes Concert	James Taylor Bonnie Rait Graham Nash John Hall The Doobie Brothers Jackson Browne		
September 21	United Kingdom United States	MUSE Concerts: Musicians United For Safe Energy 1979	No Nukes Concert	Jesse Colin Young Sweet Honey In Rock Bruce Springsteen Chaka Khan Ry Cooder Jackson Browne		
September 22	United Kingdom United States	MUSE Concerts: Musicians United For Safe Energy 1979	No Nukes Concert	Peter Tosh Bruce Springsteen Gil Scott-Heron Bonnie Rait Tom Petty & the Heartbreakers		
September 23	United Kingdom United States	MUSE Concerts: Musicians United For Safe Energy 1979	No Nukes Concert	Bill Payne MAZE Crosby, Stills & Nash		
October 5	United States	Earth, Wind & Fire	I Am Tour			
October 11	United Kingdom	Jethro Tull	Stormwatch Tour	U.K.	—N/a	
October 12	United Kingdom	Jethro Tull	Stormwatch Tour	U.K.	—N/a	
October 22	United States	Outlaws	In the Eye of the Storm Tour	Molly Hatchet	—N/a	
November 15	United States; United Kingdom	Fleetwood Mac	Tusk Tour	—N/a	34,958 / 34,958	$438,254
November 16	United States; United Kingdom	Fleetwood Mac	Tusk Tour	—N/a	34,958 / 34,958	$438,254
November 29	United States	Outlaws	In the Eye of the Storm Tour	Molly Hatchet	—N/a	
November 30	United Kingdom	Foreigner	Head Games Tour	Johnny Winter	—N/a	

== 1980s ==
1980

Entertainment events at Madison Square Garden
Date	Nationality	Artists	Tours	Supporting Acts	Attendance	Box Office
February 6	United States	Styx	Grand Decathlon Tour	The Babys		
June 23	United States	Billy Joel	Glass Houses Tour			
June 24	United States	Billy Joel	Glass Houses Tour			
June 25	United States	Billy Joel	Glass Houses Tour			
June 26	United States	Billy Joel	Glass Houses Tour			
June 27	United States	Billy Joel	Glass Houses Tour			
June 28	United States	Billy Joel	Glass Houses Tour			
June 29	United Kingdom	Genesis	Duke Tour	—N/a		
July 28	United States	Bob Seger and the Silver Bullet Band	Against The Wind Tour			
September 12	United States	Bob Seger and the Silver Bullet Band	Against The Wind Tour	REO Speedwagon		
September 13	United States	Bob Seger and the Silver Bullet Band	Against The Wind Tour	REO Speedwagon		
September 28	United Kingdom	Queen	The Game Tour	Dakota	50,000	$500,000
September 29	United Kingdom	Queen	The Game Tour	Dakota	50,000	$500,000
September 30	United Kingdom	Queen	The Game Tour	Dakota	50,000	$500,000
October 8	United Kingdom	Jethro Tull	'A' Tour	Whitesnake	—N/a	
October 9	United Kingdom	Jethro Tull	'A' Tour	Whitesnake	—N/a	
October 18	United Kingdom	Black Sabbath	Heaven & Hell Tour	Blue Öyster Cult	—N/a	
November 27	United States	Bruce Springsteen and the E Street Band	The River Tour	—N/a	39,860 / 39,860	$465,000
November 28	United States	Bruce Springsteen and the E Street Band	The River Tour	—N/a	39,860 / 39,860	$465,000
December 18	United States	Bruce Springsteen and the E Street Band	The River Tour	—N/a	39,860 / 39,860	$465,000
December 19	United States	Bruce Springsteen and the E Street Band	The River Tour	—N/a	39,860 / 39,860	$465,000

1981

Entertainment events at Madison Square Garden
Date	Nationality	Artists	Tours	Supporting Acts	Attendance	Box Office
January 10	United Kingdom	The Police	Zenyatta Mondatta Tour	Sector 27/Jools Holland	—N/a	
March 9	United States	Grateful Dead				
March 10	United States	Grateful Dead				
May 18	Canada	Rush	Moving Pictures Tour	FM		
July 14	United Kingdom	The Moody Blues	Long Distance Voyager Tour			
July 17	United States	Van Halen	Fair Warning Tour	The Fools		
August 18	United States	The Jacksons	Triumph Tour	Stacy Lattisaw		
August 19	United States	The Jacksons	Triumph Tour	Stacy Lattisaw		
August 21	United States	Styx	Paradise Theater Tour			
September 3	United States	Rick James	Street Songs Tour	Teena Marie		
November 12	United Kingdom	The Rolling Stones	1981 U.S. Tour	Screamin' Jay Hawkins	39,200 / 39,200	$580,000
November 13	United Kingdom	The Rolling Stones	1981 U.S. Tour	Screamin' Jay Hawkins	39,200 / 39,200	$580,000
November 27	United Kingdom	Rod Stewart	Worth Leavin' Home For Tour			
December 12	Australia	AC/DC	For Those About to Rock Tour			

1982

Entertainment events at Madison Square Garden
Date	Nationality	Artists	Tours	Supporting Acts	Attendance	Box Office
January 22	United Kingdom	The Police	Ghost in the Machine Tour	The Go-Go's		
February 20	United States	J. Geils Band	Freeze Frame Tour			
April 5	United Kingdom	Ozzy Osbourne	Diary of a Madman Tour	UFO		
May 17	United Kingdom	Black Sabbath	Mob Rules Tour			
June 17	United Kingdom	Black Sabbath	Mob Rules Tour			
June 18	United Kingdom	Squeeze	—N/a	A Flock of Seagulls		
June 19	United Kingdom	Rainbow	Straight Between The Eyes Tour	Scorpions; Riot		
July 27	United Kingdom	Queen	Hot Space Tour	Billy Squier		
July 28	United Kingdom	Queen	Hot Space Tour	Billy Squier		
August 4	United Kingdom	Elton John	Jump Up Tour	Quarterflash		
August 5	United Kingdom	Elton John	Jump Up Tour	Quarterflash		
August 6	United Kingdom	Elton John	Jump Up Tour	Quarterflash		
September 18	United States	Santana	Shangó Tour			
October 2	United Kingdom	Judas Priest	World Vengeance Tour	Iron Maiden	16,606 / 16,606	$544,678
October 8	United States	Van Halen	Hide Your Sheep Tour	After the Fire	16,258	$206,896
October 19	United States	The Go-Go's	Vacation Tour of America	A Flock of Seagulls		
December 2	Canada	Rush	Signals Tour	Rory Gallagher		
December 3	Canada	Rush	Signals Tour	Rory Gallagher		
December 13	United States	Pat Benatar	Get Nervous	Saga		
December 31	United States	Billy Joel	Nylon Curtain			

1983

Entertainment events at Madison Square Garden
Date	Nationality	Artists	Tours	Supporting Acts	Attendance	Box Office
February 24	Canada	Neil Young	1983 Solo Trans Tour			
March 26	United States	Meat Puppets	—N/a	Sun City Girls		
July 25	United Kingdom	David Bowie	Serious Moonlight Tour		57,820	
July 26	United Kingdom	David Bowie	Serious Moonlight Tour		57,820	
July 27	United Kingdom	David Bowie	Serious Moonlight Tour		57,820	
July 28	Canada	Joni Mitchell	Wild Things Tour			
September 12	United Kingdom	Robert Plant	The Principle of Moments tour			
September 24	United States	ZZ Top	Eliminator Tour	Bon Jovi		
October 8	United Kingdom	Iron Maiden	World Piece Tour	Quiet Riot		
October 11	United States	Grateful Dead				
October 12	United States	Grateful Dead				
November 17	United Kingdom	Genesis	The Mama Tour			
November 18	United Kingdom	Genesis	The Mama Tour			
December 5	Australia	AC/DC	Flick of the Switch Tour			
December 8			ARMS Charity Concert			
December 9			ARMS Charity Concert			
December 19	Australia	AC/DC	Flick of the Switch Tour			

1984

Entertainment events at Madison Square Garden
Date	Nationality	Artists	Tours	Supporting Acts	Attendance	Box Office
January 30	United Kingdom	Ozzy Osbourne	Bark at the Moon Tour	Mötley Crüe; Waysted		
March 19	United Kingdom	Duran Duran	1983-1984 Sing Blue Silver Tour			
March 21	United Kingdom	Duran Duran	1983-1984 Sing Blue Silver Tour			
March 30	United States	Van Halen	1984 Tour	Autograph		
March 31	United States	Van Halen	1984 Tour	Autograph		
May 14	United Kingdom	Yes	9012Live			
June 6	Germany	Scorpions	Love at First Sting Tour	Bon Jovi		
June 7	Germany	Scorpions	Love at First Sting Tour	Bon Jovi		
June 8	Germany	Scorpions	Love at First Sting Tour	Bon Jovi		
June 18	United Kingdom	Judas Priest	Metal Conqueror Tour	Great White	16,757 / 16,757	$559,956
June 21	United Kingdom	Joe Jackson	Body and Soul Tour	Ruben Blades		
June 23	United States	Billy Joel	An Innocent Man Tour		139,300 / 139,300	$2,100,000
June 24	United States	Billy Joel	An Innocent Man Tour		139,300 / 139,300	$2,100,000
June 26	United States	Billy Joel	An Innocent Man Tour		139,300 / 139,300	$2,100,000
June 27	United States	Billy Joel	An Innocent Man Tour		139,300 / 139,300	$2,100,000
June 29	United States	Billy Joel	An Innocent Man Tour		139,300 / 139,300	$2,100,000
July 1	United States	Billy Joel	An Innocent Man Tour		139,300 / 139,300	$2,100,000
July 5	United States	Billy Joel	An Innocent Man Tour		139,300 / 139,300	$2,100,000
August 4	United States	The Jacksons	Victory Tour	The Human League	32,000 / 32,000	$960,000
August 5	United States	The Jacksons	Victory Tour	The Human League	32,000 / 32,000	$960,000
August 7	United Kingdom	Simple Minds	—N/a	The Pretenders		
September 10	United Kingdom	Rod Stewart	Camouflage Tour			
September 11	United Kingdom	Rod Stewart	Camouflage Tour			
September 17	Canada	Rush	Grace Under Pressure Tour	Fastway		
October 23	United Kingdom	Elton John	Breaking Hearts Tour			
October 24	United Kingdom	Elton John	Breaking Hearts Tour			
October 25	United Kingdom	Elton John	Breaking Hearts Tour			
October 26	United Kingdom	Elton John	Breaking Hearts Tour			
November 12	United Kingdom	Elton John	Breaking Hearts Tour			
November 16	Italy	Luciano Pavarotti				
November 22	United Kingdom	Culture Club	A Kiss Across the Ocean			
December 21	United States	The Kinks	WNEW Christmas Concert 1984			

1985

Entertainment events at Madison Square Garden
Date	Nationality	Artists	Tours	Supporting Acts	Attendance	Box Office
April 1	Ireland	U2	The Unforgettable Fire Tour	Lone Justice		
June 10	United States	Madonna	The Virgin Tour	The Beastie Boys	—N/a	
June 11	United States	Madonna	The Virgin Tour	The Beastie Boys	—N/a	
June 22	India	Lata Mangeshkar, Kishore Kumar	USA Tour 1985		—N/a	
July 1	United Kingdom	Phil Collins	The No Jacket Required World Tour		—N/a	
July 2	United Kingdom	Phil Collins	The No Jacket Required World Tour			
August 1	United States	Tina Turner	Private Dancer Tour	Glenn Frey		
August 2	United States	Tina Turner	Private Dancer Tour	Glenn Frey		
August 5	United Kingdom	Robert Plant	Shaken N' Stirred Tour			
September 15	Canada	Bryan Adams	Reckless Tour	Cock Robin		
October 12	United Kingdom	Dire Straits	Brothers in Arms Tour			
December 9	United Kingdom	Roger Daltrey	Under a Raging Moon Tour	Big Country		
December 13	United Kingdom	Thompson Twins	—N/a	Orchestral Manoeuvres in the Dark	—N/a	
December 16	United States	Kiss	Asylum Tour	Black 'n Blue		

1986

Entertainment events at Madison Square Garden
Date	Nationality	Artists	Tours	Supporting Acts	Attendance	Box Office
April 8	United States	Aerosmith	Done with Mirrors Tour	Ted Nugent	18,492 / 18,492	$314,007
June 8	United States	New Edition	All 4 Love Tour	Force MDs, Cherrelle		
June 19	Canada	Bryan Adams	Reckless Tour			
June 20	United States	Dio	Sacred Heart	Accept		
July 15	United States	Bob Dylan & Tom Petty	True Confessions			
July 16	United States	Bob Dylan & Tom Petty	True Confessions			
July 17	United States	Bob Dylan & Tom Petty	True Confessions			
July 19	United States	Run-DMC	Raising Hell Tour	Beastie Boys, Whodini, LL Cool J, Timex Social Club	20,000/20,000	
July 24	United States	Neil Diamond				
July 25	United States	Neil Diamond				
July 26	United States	Neil Diamond				
July 27	United States	Neil Diamond				
July 28	United States	Neil Diamond				
July 29	United States	Neil Diamond				
July 30	United States	Neil Diamond				
July 31	United States	Neil Diamond				
August 1	Spain	Julio Iglesias	—N/a			
August 3	United States	Prince	Parade Tour			
August 4	United States	Prince	Parade Tour			
August 5	United States	Stevie Nicks	Rock a Little Tour	Peter Frampton		
September 11	United Kingdom	Elton John	Ice on Fire Tour			
September 12	United Kingdom	Elton John	Ice on Fire Tour			
September 13	United Kingdom	Elton John	Ice on Fire Tour			
September 14	United Kingdom	Elton John	Ice on Fire Tour			
September 16	Italy	Luciano Pavarotti				
September 20	United Kingdom	Emerson, Lake & Powell	—N/a			
September 23	United States	Bob Seger & The Silver Bullet Band	American Storm Tour			
September 25	United States	Bob Seger & The Silver Bullet Band	American Storm Tour			
September 26	United States	Stevie Wonder	In Squared Circle Tour			
September 29	United Kingdom	Genesis	Invisible Touch Tour		99,500 / 99,500	$1,898,937
September 30	United Kingdom	Genesis	Invisible Touch Tour		99,500 / 99,500	$1,898,937
October 1	United Kingdom	Genesis	Invisible Touch Tour		99,500 / 99,500	$1,898,937
October 2	United Kingdom	Genesis	Invisible Touch Tour		99,500 / 99,500	$1,898,937
October 3	United Kingdom	Genesis	Invisible Touch Tour		99,500 / 99,500	$1,898,937
October 4	United States	David Lee Roth	Eat 'Em and Smile Tour	Cinderella		
October 7	Canada	Neil Young & Crazy Horse	Live in A Rusted Out Garage			
October 15	United States	Billy Joel	The Bridge Tour			
October 17	United States	Billy Joel	The Bridge Tour			
October 18	United States	Billy Joel	The Bridge Tour			
October 27	United States	Lionel Richie	Dancing on the Ceiling Tour	Sheila E.		
October 28	United States	Lionel Richie	Dancing on the Ceiling Tour	Sheila E.		
October 29	United States	Lionel Richie	Dancing on the Ceiling Tour	Sheila E.		
October 30	United States	Lionel Richie	Dancing on the Ceiling Tour	Sheila E.		
October 31			Crack Down 1986			
December 1	United Kingdom	Peter Gabriel	So Tour	Youssou N'Dour		
December 2	United Kingdom	Peter Gabriel	So Tour	Youssou N'Dour		

1987

Entertainment events at Madison Square Garden
Date	Nationality	Artists	Tours	Supporting Acts	Attendance	Box Office
April 2	United Kingdom	Iron Maiden	Somewhere on Tour	Waysted		
June 5	United States	Luther Vandross		Shirley Murdock		
June 6	United States	Luther Vandross		Shirley Murdock		
June 7	United States	Luther Vandross		Shirley Murdock		
June 8	United States	Luther Vandross		Shirley Murdock		
June 12	United Kingdom	Howard Jones				
June 18	Canada	Bryan Adams	Into the Fire Tour	The Hooters		
June 19	Canada	Bryan Adams	Into the Fire Tour	The Hooters		
June 23	United Kingdom	Duran Duran	The Strange Behaviour Tour	Erasure		
June 24	United Kingdom	Duran Duran	The Strange Behaviour Tour	Erasure		
July 8	United States	Tom Petty & The Heartbreakers	Rock 'N' Caravan '87	The Del Fuegos; The Georgia Satellites		
July 13	United States	Madonna	Who's That Girl Tour	Level 42	14,262 / 14,262	$668,225
August 1	United States	Bon Jovi	Slippery When Wet Tour	Keel		
August 2	United States	Bon Jovi	Slippery When Wet Tour	Keel		
August 3	United States	Bon Jovi	Slippery When Wet Tour	Keel		
August 5	United States	Billy Idol	Whiplash Smile	The Cult		
August 17	United States	Beastie Boys and Run-D.M.C.	Together Forever Tour			
August 20	United States	Mötley Crüe	Girls, Girls, Girls Tour	Whitesnake		
August 24	United States	Tina Turner	Break Every Rule Tour	Glass Tiger	18,000 / 18,000	$338,789
September 1	United Kingdom	David Bowie	Glass Spider Tour			
September 2	United Kingdom	David Bowie	Glass Spider Tour			
September 8	United States	Whitney Houston	Moment of Truth World Tour	Kenny G	58,800 / 58,800	$862,000
September 9	United States	Whitney Houston	Moment of Truth World Tour	Kenny G	58,800 / 58,800	$862,000
September 15	United States	Grateful Dead				
September 16	United States	Grateful Dead				
September 18	United States	Grateful Dead				
September 19	United States	Grateful Dead				
September 20	United States	Grateful Dead				
September 28	Ireland	U2	The Joshua Tree Tour	The Pogues; Little Steven and the Disciples of Soul	39,510 / 39,510	$744,838
September 29	Ireland	U2	The Joshua Tree Tour	The Pogues; Little Steven and the Disciples of Soul	39,510 / 39,510	$744,838
October 5	United Kingdom	Pink Floyd	A Momentary Lapse of Reason Tour		50,571 / 50,571	$1,100,500
October 6	United Kingdom	Pink Floyd	A Momentary Lapse of Reason Tour		50,571 / 50,571	$1,100,500
October 7	United Kingdom	Pink Floyd	A Momentary Lapse of Reason Tour		50,571 / 50,571	$1,100,500
December 11	Canada	Rush	Hold Your Fire Tour	Tommy Shaw	—N/a	

1988

Entertainment events at Madison Square Garden
Date	Nationality	Artists	Tours	Supporting Acts	Attendance	Box Office
March 3	United States	Michael Jackson	Bad World Tour		57,000 / 57,000	$1,800,000
March 5	United States	Michael Jackson	Bad World Tour		57,000 / 57,000	$1,800,000
March 6	United States	Michael Jackson	Bad World Tour		57,000 / 57,000	$1,800,000
May 16	United States	Bruce Springsteen and The E Street Band	Tunnel of Love Express Tour		98,458 / 98,458	$2,215,305
May 18	United States	Bruce Springsteen and The E Street Band	Tunnel of Love Express Tour		98,458 / 98,458	$2,215,305
May 19	United States	Bruce Springsteen and The E Street Band	Tunnel of Love Express Tour		98,458 / 98,458	$2,215,305
May 22	United States	Bruce Springsteen and The E Street Band	Tunnel of Love Express Tour		98,458 / 98,458	$2,215,305
May 23	United States	Bruce Springsteen and The E Street Band	Tunnel of Love Express Tour		98,458 / 98,458	$2,215,305
July 13	United States	David Lee Roth	Skyscraper Tour	Poison		
July 29	United Kingdom	Robert Plant	Non Stop Go Tour	Cheap Trick		
August 14	United Kingdom	George Michael	Faith World Tour		51,312 / 51,312	$1,129,905
August 15	United Kingdom	George Michael	Faith World Tour		51,312 / 51,312	$1,129,905
August 16	United Kingdom	George Michael	Faith World Tour		51,312 / 51,312	$1,129,905
August 30	Australia	AC/DC	Blow Up Your Video World Tour	White Lion	14,723 / 14,723	$279,962
September 14	United States	Grateful Dead		Suzanne Vega; Bruce Hornsby; Hall & Oates		
September 15	United States	Grateful Dead		Suzanne Vega; Bruce Hornsby; Hall & Oates		
September 16	United States	Grateful Dead		Suzanne Vega; Bruce Hornsby; Hall & Oates		
September 18	United States	Grateful Dead		Suzanne Vega; Bruce Hornsby; Hall & Oates		
September 19	United States	Grateful Dead		Suzanne Vega; Bruce Hornsby; Hall & Oates		
September 20	United States	Grateful Dead		Suzanne Vega; Bruce Hornsby; Hall & Oates		
September 22	United States	Grateful Dead		Suzanne Vega; Bruce Hornsby; Hall & Oates		
September 23	United States	Grateful Dead		Suzanne Vega; Bruce Hornsby; Hall & Oates		
September 24	United States	Grateful Dead		Suzanne Vega; Bruce Hornsby; Hall & Oates		
September 26	United Kingdom	Rod Stewart	Out of Order Tour		32,782 / 32,782	$678,120
September 27	United Kingdom	Rod Stewart	Out of Order Tour		32,782 / 32,782	$678,120
October 2	United States	Prince	Lovesexy Tour		38,440 / 38,440	$875,000
October 3	United States	Prince	Lovesexy Tour		38,440 / 38,440	$875,000
October 4	United States	Anita Baker; Luther Vandross	The Heat Tour			
October 5	United States	Anita Baker; Luther Vandross	The Heat Tour			
October 6	United States	Anita Baker; Luther Vandross	The Heat Tour			
October 9	United States	Anita Baker; Luther Vandross	The Heat Tour			
October 17	United Kingdom	Elton John	Reg Strikes Back Tour	Wet Wet Wet	96,750 / 96,750	$2,250,580
October 18	United Kingdom	Elton John	Reg Strikes Back Tour	Wet Wet Wet	96,750 / 96,750	$2,250,580
October 20	United Kingdom	Elton John	Reg Strikes Back Tour	Wet Wet Wet	96,750 / 96,750	$2,250,580
October 21	United Kingdom	Elton John	Reg Strikes Back Tour	Wet Wet Wet	96,750 / 96,750	$2,250,580
October 22	United Kingdom	Elton John	Reg Strikes Back Tour	Wet Wet Wet	96,750 / 96,750	$2,250,580
October 27	United States	New Edition	Heartbreak Tour	Bobby Brown; Al B. Sure!		
October 28	United Kingdom	The Moody Blues		Jack Bruce		

1989

Entertainment events at Madison Square Garden
Date	Nationality	Artists	Tours	Supporting Acts	Attendance	Box Office
February 4	United States	New Edition	Heartbreak Tour	Bobby Brown; Al B. Sure!		
April 10	United States	R.E.M.	Green Tour	Indigo Girls		
October 3	United Kingdom	Elton John	Sleeping with the Past Tour		65,345 / 65,345	$1,613,975
October 4	United Kingdom	Elton John	Sleeping with the Past Tour		65,345 / 65,345	$1,613,975
October 5	United Kingdom	Elton John	Sleeping with the Past Tour		65,345 / 65,345	$1,613,975
October 6	United Kingdom	Elton John	Sleeping with the Past Tour		65,345 / 65,345	$1,613,975
October 7	United Kingdom	Elton John	Sleeping with the Past Tour		65,345 / 65,345	$1,613,975
October 29	United States	Alabama		George Strait		
November 11	United States	Stevie Ray Vaughan	In Step Tour	Jeff Beck	18,565 / 18,565	$417,713
December 11	United Kingdom	Paul McCartney	The Paul McCartney World Tour			
December 12	United Kingdom	Paul McCartney	The Paul McCartney World Tour			
December 14	United Kingdom	Paul McCartney	The Paul McCartney World Tour			
December 15	United Kingdom	Paul McCartney	The Paul McCartney World Tour			

== 1990s ==
1990

Entertainment events at Madison Square Garden
Date	Nationality	Artists	Tours	Supporting Acts	Attendance	Box Office
February 16	United Kingdom	Erasure	Wild Tour			
March 15	United States	Janet Jackson	Rhythm Nation World Tour 1990		35,741 / 35,741	$1,053,548
March 16	United States	Janet Jackson	Rhythm Nation World Tour 1990		35,741 / 35,741	$1,053,548
March 23	United Kingdom	Anderson Bruford Wakeman Howe	An Evening of Yes Music Plus			
September 14	United States	Grateful Dead		Kiara; Guillermo Dávila		
September 15	United States	Grateful Dead		Kiara; Guillermo Dávila		
September 16	United States	Grateful Dead		Kiara; Guillermo Dávila		
September 18	United States	Grateful Dead		Kiara; Guillermo Dávila		
September 19	United States	Grateful Dead		Kiara; Guillermo Dávila		
September 20	United States	Grateful Dead		Kiara; Guillermo Dávila		
September 24	United States	The Allman Brothers Band	—N/a	Meat Loaf	—N/a	
September 28	United Kingdom	Phil Collins	Seriously, Live!			
September 29	United Kingdom	Phil Collins	Seriously, Live!			
September 30	United Kingdom	Phil Collins	Seriously, Live!			
October 1	United Kingdom	Phil Collins	Seriously, Live!			
October 2	United Kingdom	Phil Collins	Seriously, Live!			
October 3	United Kingdom	Phil Collins	Seriously, Live!			
November 9	United States	Kiss	Hot in the Shade Tour	Slaughter; Winger		

1991

Entertainment events at Madison Square Garden
Date	Nationality	Artists	Tours	Supporting Acts	Attendance	Box Office
January 28	United States	ZZ Top	Recycler Tour	The Black Crowes	26,915 / 26,915	$565,515
January 29	United States	ZZ Top	Recycler Tour	The Black Crowes	26,915 / 26,915	$565,515
February 4	Canada; United States	Neil Young & Crazy Horse	Smell the Horse Tour	Sonic Youth		
February 16	Australia	INXS	X-Factor Tour	The Soup Dragons		
July 13	Australia	AC/DC	Razors Edge World Tour	L.A. Guns		
July 23	United States	Whitney Houston	I'm Your Baby Tonight World Tour	After 7	13,850 / 14,000	$401,773
September 5	United Kingdom	Sting	Soul Cages Tour	Special Beat		
September 8	United States	Grateful Dead				
September 9	United States	Grateful Dead				
September 10	United States	Grateful Dead				
September 12	United States	Grateful Dead				
September 13	United States	Grateful Dead				
September 14	United States	Grateful Dead				
September 16	United States	Grateful Dead				
September 17	United States	Grateful Dead				
September 18	United States	Grateful Dead				
October 25	United Kingdom	George Michael	Cover to Cover Tour		29,031 / 29,031	$752,685
October 26	United Kingdom	George Michael	Cover to Cover Tour		29,031 / 29,031	$752,685
November 15	United States	Jerry Garcia Band	Fall Tour 1991	Blues Traveler		
December 6	Canada	Rush	Roll the Bones Tour	Vinnie Moore		
December 7	Canada	Rush	Roll the Bones Tour	Vinnie Moore		
December 9	United States	Guns N' Roses	Use Your Illusion Tour	Soundgarden		
December 10	United States	Guns N' Roses	Use Your Illusion Tour	Soundgarden		
December 13	United States	Guns N' Roses	Use Your Illusion Tour	Soundgarden		

1992

Entertainment events at Madison Square Garden
Date	Nationality	Artists	Tours	Supporting Acts	Attendance	Box Office
January 27	United Kingdom	Rod Stewart	Vagabond Heart Tour			
January 28	United Kingdom	Rod Stewart	Vagabond Heart Tour			
February 26	United Kingdom	Dire Straits	On Every Street Tour			
March 20	Ireland	U2	Zoo TV Tour	Pixies	18,179 / 18,179	$454,475
May 15	United States	MC Hammer	Too Legit to Quit World Tour	Boyz II Men		
May 16	United States	MC Hammer	Too Legit to Quit World Tour	Boyz II Men		
October 2	United Kingdom	Elton John	The One Tour	Lionel Richie; Bruce Hornsby	113,406 / 113,406	$3,345,477
October 3	United Kingdom	Elton John	The One Tour	Lionel Richie; Bruce Hornsby	113,406 / 113,406	$3,345,477
October 5	United Kingdom	Elton John	The One Tour	Lionel Richie; Bruce Hornsby	113,406 / 113,406	$3,345,477
October 7	United Kingdom	Elton John	The One Tour	Lionel Richie; Bruce Hornsby	113,406 / 113,406	$3,345,477
October 9	United Kingdom	Elton John	The One Tour	Lionel Richie; Bruce Hornsby	113,406 / 113,406	$3,345,477
October 10	United Kingdom	Elton John	The One Tour	Lionel Richie; Bruce Hornsby	113,406 / 113,406	$3,345,477
October 11	United Kingdom	Elton John	The One Tour	Lionel Richie; Bruce Hornsby	113,406 / 113,406	$3,345,477
October 16	United States	Bob Dylan; Various Artists	The 30th Anniversary Concert Celebration			
December 31	United States	Michael Bolton				

1993

Entertainment events at Madison Square Garden
Date	Nationality	Artists	Tours	Supporting Acts	Attendance	Box Office
January 31	United States	Bobby Brown	Humpin' Around the World Tour	Mary J. Blige; TLC		
February 14	Venezuela	Oscar D'León				
June 24	United Kingdom	Peter Gabriel	Secret World Tour	Papa Wemba	15,297 / 15,297	$466,898
June 26	United States	Bruce Springsteen	Bruce Springsteen 1992–1993 World Tour			
July 28			Z-100 Birthday Party 1993			
August 18	United States	Steely Dan	Reunion Tour			
September 11	Mexico	Luis Miguel	Aries Tour			
September 16	United States	Grateful Dead	Fall Tour 1993			
September 17	United States	Grateful Dead	Fall Tour 1993			
September 18	United States	Grateful Dead	Fall Tour 1993			
September 20	United States	Grateful Dead	Fall Tour 1993			
September 21	United States	Grateful Dead	Fall Tour 1993			
September 22	United States	Grateful Dead	Fall Tour 1993			
September 23	United Kingdom	Depeche Mode	Devotional Tour	The The		
September 24	United Kingdom	Depeche Mode	Devotional Tour	The The		
October 2	United States	Billy Joel	River of Dreams Tour			
October 4	United States	Billy Joel	River of Dreams Tour			
October 5	United States	Billy Joel	River of Dreams Tour			
October 6	United States	Billy Joel	River of Dreams Tour			
October 8	United States	Billy Joel	River of Dreams Tour			
October 9	United States	Billy Joel	River of Dreams Tour			
October 11	United States	Billy Joel	River of Dreams Tour			
October 12	United States	Billy Joel	River of Dreams Tour			
October 14	United States	Madonna	The Girlie Show World Tour	U.N.V.	43,353 / 43,353	$2,020,000
October 15	United States	Madonna	The Girlie Show World Tour	U.N.V.	43,353 / 43,353	$2,020,000
October 17	United States	Madonna	The Girlie Show World Tour	U.N.V.	43,353 / 43,353	$2,020,000
November 3	United States	Jerry Garcia Band				
November 12	United States	Jerry Garcia Band				
November 29	United States	Neil Diamond	Christmas Tour			
November 30	United States	Neil Diamond	Christmas Tour			
December 3	United States	Little Anthony and the Imperials		Martha and the Vandellas		
December 10	United States	Mariah Carey	Music Box Tour		15,050 / 15,627	$473,727
December 17	United States	Janet Jackson	Janet World Tour	Tony! Toni! Toné!	14,621 / 14,621	$548,902
December 18	United States	Janet Jackson	Janet World Tour	Tony! Toni! Toné!	14,621 / 14,621	$548,902
December 22	United States	Janet Jackson	Janet World Tour	Tony! Toni! Toné!	14,621 / 14,621	$548,902
December 23	United States	Janet Jackson	Janet World Tour	Tony! Toni! Toné!	14,621 / 14,621	$548,902
December 31	United States	Janet Jackson	Janet World Tour	Tony! Toni! Toné!	15,472 / 15,472	$838,500

1994

Entertainment events at Madison Square Garden
Date	Nationality	Artists	Tours	Supporting Acts	Attendance	Box Office
February 17	United States	Aerosmith	Get a Grip Tour	Brother Cane	18,083 / 18,083	$632,905
March 6	Canada	Bryan Adams		Crash Test Dummies		
March 8	Canada	Rush	Counterparts Tour	Candlebox		
March 9	Canada	Rush	Counterparts Tour	Candlebox		
June 20	United States	Barbra Streisand	Barbra Streisand in Concert	—N/a	94,284 / 94,284	$16,488,900
June 23	United States	Barbra Streisand	Barbra Streisand in Concert	—N/a	94,284 / 94,284	$16,488,900
June 26	United States	Barbra Streisand	Barbra Streisand in Concert	—N/a	94,284 / 94,284	$16,488,900
June 28	United States	Barbra Streisand	Barbra Streisand in Concert	—N/a	94,284 / 94,284	$16,488,900
June 30	United States	Barbra Streisand	Barbra Streisand in Concert	—N/a	94,284 / 94,284	$16,488,900
July 6	United Kingdom	Phil Collins	Both Sides of the World Tour	—N/a	28,988 / 29,200	$1,145,380
July 7	United Kingdom	Phil Collins	Both Sides of the World Tour	—N/a	28,988 / 29,200	$1,145,380
July 10	United States	Barbra Streisand	Barbra Streisand in Concert	—N/a	94,284 / 94,284	$16,488,900
July 12	United States	Barbra Streisand	Barbra Streisand in Concert	—N/a	94,284 / 94,284	$16,488,900
September 10	United Kingdom	Yes	Talk Tour	—N/a		
October 8	United Kingdom	Eric Clapton	Nothing But the Blues Tour	Jimmie Vaughan		
October 9	United Kingdom	Eric Clapton	Nothing But the Blues Tour	Jimmie Vaughan		
October 10	United Kingdom	Eric Clapton	Nothing But the Blues Tour	Jimmie Vaughan		
October 13	United States	Grateful Dead	Fall Tour '94			
October 14	United States	Grateful Dead	Fall Tour '94			
October 15	United States	Grateful Dead	Fall Tour '94			
October 17	United States	Grateful Dead	Fall Tour '94			
October 18	United States	Grateful Dead	Fall Tour '94			
October 19	United States	Grateful Dead	Fall Tour '94			
November 12	United States	Little Richard		Jerry Lee Lewis		
December 5			Z100 Jingle Ball 1994	—N/a		
December 8	United States	Nine Inch Nails	Further Down the Spiral tour	Marilyn Manson; The Jim Rose Circus Sideshow		
December 9	United States	Nine Inch Nails	Further Down the Spiral tour	Marilyn Manson; The Jim Rose Circus Sideshow		

1995

Entertainment events at Madison Square Garden
Date	Nationality	Artists	Tours	Supporting Acts	Attendance	Box Office
March 20	United States	Tom Petty & The Heartbreakers	Dogs with Wings Tour	Pete Droge		
May 13	United States	Liza Minnelli				
May 23	United States	Beastie Boys	Quadraphonic Tour			
June 22	United States	R.E.M.	Monster Tour	Luscious Jackson		
June 23	United States	R.E.M.	Monster Tour	Luscious Jackson		
June 24	United States	R.E.M.	Monster Tour	Luscious Jackson		
September 17	United Kingdom	Eric Clapton	Nothing But the Blues Tour			
October 5	United States	Jodeci				
October 10	United States	Mariah Carey	Fantasy: Mariah Carey at Madison Square Garden			
October 12	United Kingdom	Elton John	Made in England Tour		91,134 / 91,134	$3,530,399
October 13	United Kingdom	Elton John	Made in England Tour		91,134 / 91,134	$3,530,399
October 14	United Kingdom	Elton John	Made in England Tour		91,134 / 91,134	$3,530,399
October 17	United Kingdom	Elton John	Made in England Tour		91,134 / 91,134	$3,530,399
October 19	United Kingdom	Elton John	Made in England Tour		91,134 / 91,134	$3,530,399
October 20	United Kingdom	Elton John	Made in England Tour		91,134 / 91,134	$3,530,399
October 26	United Kingdom	Page and Plant	No Quarter tour	The Tragically Hip		
October 27	United Kingdom	Page and Plant	No Quarter tour	The Tragically Hip		
December 30	United States	Phish	New Year's Run 1995			
December 31	United States	Phish	New Year's Run 1995			

1996

Entertainment events at Madison Square Garden
Date	Nationality	Artists	Tours	Supporting Acts	Attendance	Box Office
February 9	United States	Red Hot Chili Peppers	One Hot Minute Tour	The Rentals; Silverchair		
February 21	United States	Bob Seger & The Silver Bullet Band				
March 15	Australia	AC/DC	Ballbreaker World Tour	The Poor	13,656	461,770
May 22	United Kingdom	Rod Stewart	A Spanner in the Works Tour		31,672 / 35,086	$1,822,635
May 23	United Kingdom	Rod Stewart	A Spanner in the Works Tour		31,672 / 35,086	$1,822,635
July 16	United Kingdom	The Who	The Who Tour 1996	Joan Osborne; Me'Shell NdegeOcello		
July 17	United Kingdom	The Who	The Who Tour 1996	Joan Osborne; Me'Shell NdegeOcello		
July 18	United Kingdom	The Who	The Who Tour 1996	Joan Osborne; Me'Shell NdegeOcello		
July 20	United Kingdom	The Who	The Who Tour 1996	Joan Osborne; Me'Shell NdegeOcello		
July 21	United Kingdom	The Who	The Who Tour 1996	Joan Osborne; Me'Shell NdegeOcello		
July 22	United Kingdom	The Who	The Who Tour 1996	Joan Osborne; Me'Shell NdegeOcello		
July 25	United States	Kiss	Alive/Worldwide Tour	The Nixons; 311; D Generation	58,820 / 58,820	$3,267,670
July 26	United States	Kiss	Alive/Worldwide Tour	The Nixons; 311; D Generation	58,820 / 58,820	$3,267,670
July 27	United States	Kiss	Alive/Worldwide Tour	The Nixons; 311; D Generation	58,820 / 58,820	$3,267,670
July 28	United States	Kiss	Alive/Worldwide Tour	The Nixons; 311; D Generation	58,820 / 58,820	$3,267,670
July 29	Canada	Celine Dion	Falling Into You Around the World Tour	The Corrs	13,524 / 13,524	$624,260
July 30	United States	Hootie & the Blowfish		John Hiatt		
July 31	United States	Hootie & the Blowfish		John Hiatt		
August 19	Canada; United States	Neil Young & Crazy Horse	1996 Broken Arrow North American Tour	Jewel; The Afghan Whigs		
September 17	United States	The Smashing Pumpkins	Infinite Sadness tour	Giant Lee Buffalo; Silverchair		
September 18	United States	The Smashing Pumpkins	Infinite Sadness tour	Giant Lee Buffalo; Silverchair		
October 3	United States	Dave Matthews Band	1996 Fall Tour	Soul Coughing	17,010	
October 4	United States	Dave Matthews Band	1996 Fall Tour	Soul Coughing	17,010	
October 21	United States	Phish	Fall Tour 1996			
October 22	United States	Phish	Fall Tour 1996			
November 25	United States	Stone Temple Pilots		Local H		
December 5	United States		Z-100 Jingle Ball '96			
December 15	United States	Tracy Chapman				
December 31	United States	Blues Traveler		They Might Be Giants		

1997

Entertainment events at Madison Square Garden
Date	Nationality	Artists	Tours	Supporting Acts	Attendance	Box Office
January 7	United Kingdom	David Bowie	David Bowie's 50th Anniversary Concert			
January 8	United Kingdom	David Bowie	David Bowie's 50th Anniversary Concert			
January 9	United Kingdom	David Bowie	David Bowie's 50th Anniversary Concert			
February 26	—N/a	39th Annual Grammy Awards		—N/a		
March 10	United States	Metallica	Poor Touring Me	Corrosion of Conformity		
March 11	United States	Metallica	Poor Touring Me	Corrosion of Conformity		
March 13	United Kingdom	Phil Collins	Trip Into the Light World Tour			
April 12	Canada	Celine Dion	Falling Into You Around the World Tour	The Corrs	13,524 / 13,524	$624,260
April 14	United Kingdom	Bush	Razorblade Suitcase Tour	Veruca Salt		
August 6	United States	Aerosmith	Nine Lives Tour	Jonny Lang		
September 12	United States	Mary J. Blige	Share My World Tour	Usher		
September 18	United States	John Fogerty	Blue Moon Swamp Tour			
September 20	Mexico	Juan Gabriel				
October 8	United States	Luther Vandross	Your Secret Love Tour			
October 14	United States	Chubby Checker				
October 15	United States	Chubby Checker				
October 16	United States	Chubby Checker				
October 17	United States	Chubby Checker				
November 27	United States; United Kingdom	Fleetwood Mac	The Dance Tour			
December 7	United States	Earth, Wind & Fire				
December 9	United States		Z-100 Jingle Ball 1997			
December 29	United States	Phish	New Year's Run 1997			
December 30	United States	Phish	New Year's Run 1997			
December 31	United States	Phish	New Year's Run 1997			

1998

Entertainment events at Madison Square Garden
Date	Nationality	Artists	Tours	Supporting Acts	Attendance	Box Office
January 14	United Kingdom	The Rolling Stones	Bridges to Babylon Tour	Fiona Apple	53,626 / 53,626	$6,395,815
January 16	United Kingdom	The Rolling Stones	Bridges to Babylon Tour	Fiona Apple	53,626 / 53,626	$6,395,815
January 17	United Kingdom	The Rolling Stones	Bridges to Babylon Tour	Fiona Apple	53,626 / 53,626	$6,395,815
February 19	United States	Jimmy Buffett	Havana Daydreamin' Tour			
April 10	United States		1998 Essence Awards			
April 18	United Kingdom	Eric Clapton	Pilgrim Tour			
April 19	United Kingdom	Eric Clapton	Pilgrim Tour			
April 20	United Kingdom	Eric Clapton	Pilgrim Tour			
May 22	United States	Van Halen	III Tour	Creed		
July 1	United Kingdom	Spice Girls	Spiceworld Tour			
July 14	United States	Boyz II Men				
July 16	United Kingdom	Page & Plant	Walking Into Everywhere Tour 1998			
July 28	United States	Tori Amos	Plugged Tour			
August 1	Mexico	Alejandro Fernandez				
August 6	Italy	Andrea Bocelli				
August 21	United States	Beastie Boys	Hello Nasty Tour	A Tribe Called Quest		
September 3	Canada	Celine Dion	Let's Talk About Love Tour	André-Philippe Gagnon	37,448 / 37,448	$2,256,115
September 4	Canada	Celine Dion	Let's Talk About Love Tour	André-Philippe Gagnon	37,448 / 37,448	$2,256,115
September 10	United States	Pearl Jam	Yield Tour	Ben Harper		
September 11	United States	Pearl Jam	Yield Tour	Ben Harper		
September 24	United States	Barry Manilow				
September 25	United States	Prince	New Power Soul Tour	Marc Anthony; Chaka Khan		
September 26	United States	Prince	New Power Soul Tour	Marc Anthony; Chaka Khan		
October 2	United Kingdom	Rod Stewart	When We Were The New Boys Tour			
October 3	United Kingdom	Rod Stewart	When We Were The New Boys Tour			
October 10	United States	Janet Jackson	The Velvet Rope Tour	Usher	28,930 / 28,930	$2,542,024
October 11	United States	Janet Jackson	The Velvet Rope Tour	Usher	28,930 / 28,930	$2,542,024
October 13	United Kingdom	Elton John	Big Picture Tour		73,315/73,315	$3,600,234
October 14	United Kingdom	Elton John	Big Picture Tour		73,315/73,315	$3,600,234
October 17	United Kingdom	Elton John	Big Picture Tour		73,315/73,315	$3,600,234
October 18	United Kingdom	Elton John	Big Picture Tour		73,315/73,315	$3,600,234
October 23	United States		VH1 Fashion Awards			
October 28	United Kingdom	Depeche Mode	The Singles Tour	Stabbing Westward; Angeldust		
October 29	United Kingdom	Depeche Mode	The Singles Tour	Stabbing Westward; Angeldust		
November 1	United States	Bob Dylan	Never Ending Tour 1998	Joni Mitchell; Dave Alvin and the Guilty Men		
November 23	United States	Kiss	Psycho Circus Tour		15,000	
December 2	United States	Dave Matthews Band	1998 Fall Tour	Bela Fleck & The Flecktones	18,657	
December 3	United States	Dave Matthews Band	1998 Fall Tour	Bela Fleck & The Flecktones	18,657	
December 5	United States	Billy Joel				
December 13	United States	Billy Joel				
December 15	United States	Billy Joel				
December 17	United States		Z-100 Jingle Ball '98			
December 18	United States	Billy Joel	World Tour 1998-1999			
December 20	United States	Billy Joel	World Tour 1998-1999			
December 22	United States	Billy Joel	World Tour 1998-1999			
December 28	United States	Phish	New Year's Run 1998			
December 29	United States	Phish	New Year's Run 1998			
December 30	United States	Phish	New Year's Run 1998			
December 31	United States	Phish	New Year's Run 1998			

1999

Entertainment events at Madison Square Garden
Date	Nationality	Artists	Tours	Supporting Acts	Attendance	Box Office
February 22	United States	Jimmy Buffett	Don't Stop the Carnival Tour			
June 15	Canada	Shania Twain	Come On Over Tour	Shane Minor	18,371 / 18,371	$1,018,695
June 30	United Kingdom	Eric Clapton				
July 13	United States	Cher	Do You Believe?	Cyndi Lauper; Wild Orchid	15,439 / 15,439	$1,070,828
July 27	United States	Bob Dylan; Paul Simon	Never Ending Tour 1999	—N/a	17,161 / 17,161	$1,347,123
August 22	United States	Chaka Khan				
September 8	United States	Lenny Kravitz		Buckcherry; Smash Mouth		
October 15	United Kingdom	Elton John	An Evening with Elton John			
October 16	United Kingdom	Elton John	An Evening with Elton John			
October 21	United States	John Mellencamp		Susan Tedeschi		
October 25	United States	Bette Midler		Melissa Etheridge		
October 26	United States	Bette Midler		Melissa Etheridge		
October 28	Puerto Rico	Ricky Martin	Livin' la Vida Loca World Tour	Jessica Simpson	29,774 / 29,774	$1,826,755
October 29	Puerto Rico	Ricky Martin	Livin' la Vida Loca World Tour	Jessica Simpson	29,774 / 29,774	$1,826,755
November 1	United Kingdom	Phil Collins	106.7 Lite FM's 15th Anniversary Party			
November 9	United Kingdom	Eurythmics	Peace Tour			
November 23	United States	Metallica	Garage Remains the Same Tour	—N/a		
December 2			Sports Illustrated's Sports Awards 1999			
December 16			Z-100 Jingle Ball			
December 31	United States	Billy Joel				

== 2000s ==
2000

Entertainment events at Madison Square Garden
Date	Nationality	Artists	Tours	Supporting Acts	Attendance	Box Office
January 21	United States	TLC	FanMail Tour	Christina Aguilera; Blaque		
April 3	United States; Canada; United Kingdom	Crosby, Stills, Nash & Young	CSNY2K Tour			
April 4	United States; Canada; United Kingdom	Crosby, Stills, Nash & Young	CSNY2K Tour			
April 7	United States	Tina Turner	Twenty Four Seven Tour	Lionel Richie	29,117 / 29,962	$2,489,681
April 8	United States	Tina Turner	Twenty Four Seven Tour	Lionel Richie	29,117 / 29,962	$2,489,681
April 11	United States	Mariah Carey	Rainbow World Tour	Da Brat	14,870 / 14,870	$1,066,413
June 12	United States	Bruce Springsteen & The E Street Band	Reunion Tour	—N/a	190,530 / 190,530	$12,217,343
June 15	United States	Bruce Springsteen & The E Street Band	Reunion Tour	—N/a	190,530 / 190,530	$12,217,343
June 17	United States	Bruce Springsteen & The E Street Band	Reunion Tour	—N/a	190,530 / 190,530	$12,217,343
June 20	United States	Bruce Springsteen & The E Street Band	Reunion Tour	—N/a	190,530 / 190,530	$12,217,343
June 22	United States	Bruce Springsteen & The E Street Band	Reunion Tour	—N/a	190,530 / 190,530	$12,217,343
June 23	United States	Bruce Springsteen & The E Street Band	Reunion Tour	—N/a	190,530 / 190,530	$12,217,343
June 26	United States	Bruce Springsteen & The E Street Band	Reunion Tour	—N/a	190,530 / 190,530	$12,217,343
June 27	United States	Bruce Springsteen & The E Street Band	Reunion Tour	—N/a	190,530 / 190,530	$12,217,343
June 29	United States	Bruce Springsteen & The E Street Band	Reunion Tour	—N/a	190,530 / 190,530	$12,217,343
July 1	United States	Bruce Springsteen & The E Street Band	Reunion Tour	—N/a	190,530 / 190,530	$12,217,343
July 6	United States	Diana Ross & The Supremes	Return to Love Tour			
July 11	United Kingdom	Roger Waters	In the Flesh Tour 2000			
July 13	United Kingdom	Roger Waters	In the Flesh Tour 2000			
July 25	United States	NSYNC	No Strings Attached Tour	Pink; Sisqó		
July 26	United States	NSYNC	No Strings Attached Tour	Pink; Sisqó		
July 27	United States	NSYNC	No Strings Attached Tour	Pink; Sisqó		
July 28	United States	NSYNC	No Strings Attached Tour	Pink; Sisqó		
August 5	United Kingdom	Iron Maiden	Brave New World Tour	Halford; Queensrÿche		
September 16	United States	Faith Hill; Tim McGraw	Soul2Soul Tour	Keith Urban; The Warren Brothers		
September 27	United States	Barbra Streisand	Timeless	—N/a	25,994 / 25,994	$14,393,750
September 28	United States	Barbra Streisand	Timeless	—N/a	25,994 / 25,994	$14,393,750
October 3	United Kingdom	The Who	The Who Tour 2000	The Wallflowers; Jimmy Page; The Black Crowes		
October 4	United Kingdom	The Who	The Who Tour 2000	The Wallflowers; Jimmy Page; The Black Crowes		
October 6	United Kingdom	The Who	The Who Tour 2000	The Wallflowers; Jimmy Page; The Black Crowes		
October 7	United Kingdom	The Who	The Who Tour 2000	The Wallflowers; Jimmy Page; The Black Crowes		
October 20	United Kingdom	Elton John	Medusa Tour			
October 21	United Kingdom	Elton John	Medusa Tour			
December 12	United States	Dave Matthews Band	2000 Fall Tour	Steve Earle and the Dukes		
December 13	United States	Dave Matthews Band	2000 Fall Tour	Steve Earle and the Dukes		
December 14			Z-100 Jingle Ball			

2001

Entertainment events at Madison Square Garden
Date	Nationality	Artists	Tours	Supporting Acts	Attendance	Box Office
June 17	Ireland	U2	Elevation Tour	PJ Harvey	36,632 / 36,632	$3,141,260
June 19	Ireland	U2	Elevation Tour	PJ Harvey	36,632 / 36,632	$3,141,260
June 21	United Kingdom	Eric Clapton	Reptile World Tour	Doyle Bramhall II		
June 22	United Kingdom	Eric Clapton	Reptile World Tour	Doyle Bramhall II		
June 23	United Kingdom	Eric Clapton	Reptile World Tour	Doyle Bramhall II		
June 27	United Kingdom	Depeche Mode	Exciter Tour	Poe		
June 28	United Kingdom	Depeche Mode	Exciter Tour	Poe		
July 25	United States	Madonna	Drowned World Tour	—N/a	79,401 / 79,401	$9,297,105
July 26	United States	Madonna	Drowned World Tour	—N/a	79,401 / 79,401	$9,297,105
July 28	United States	Madonna	Drowned World Tour	—N/a	79,401 / 79,401	$9,297,105
July 30	United States	Madonna	Drowned World Tour	—N/a	79,401 / 79,401	$9,297,105
July 31	United States	Madonna	Drowned World Tour	—N/a	79,401 / 79,401	$9,297,105
August 13	United Kingdom	Sade	Lovers Rock Tour	India Arie		
August 15	United Kingdom	Sade	Lovers Rock Tour	India Arie		
August 20	United States	Janet Jackson	All for You Tour	112	38,743 / 42,492	$3,175,672
August 22	United States	Janet Jackson	All for You Tour	112	38,743 / 42,492	$3,175,672
August 23	United States	Janet Jackson	All for You Tour	112	38,743 / 42,492	$3,175,672
September 7	United States	Michael Jackson	30th Anniversary Celebration	—N/a		$10,072,105
September 10	United States	Michael Jackson	30th Anniversary Celebration	—N/a		$10,072,105
October 20	—N/a	The Concert for New York City		—N/a		
October 24	Ireland	U2	Elevation Tour	Garbage; No Doubt; Stereophonics	55,155 / 55,155	$4,706,370
October 25	Ireland	U2	Elevation Tour	Garbage; No Doubt; Stereophonics	55,155 / 55,155	$4,706,370
October 27	Ireland	U2	Elevation Tour	Garbage; No Doubt; Stereophonics	55,155 / 55,155	$4,706,370
November 12	United States	Aerosmith	Just Push Play Tour	The Cult		
November 19	United States	Bob Dylan	Never Ending Tour 2001			
November 27	United Kingdom	Elton John	Songs from the West Coast Tour			
November 28	United Kingdom	Elton John	Songs from the West Coast Tour			
December 5	United States	Britney Spears	Dream Within a Dream Tour	O-Town	16,674 / 16,674	$933,210
December 16			Z-100 Jingle Ball			

2002

Entertainment events at Madison Square Garden
Date	Nationality	Artists	Tours	Supporting Acts	Attendance	Box Office
February 22	United States; Canada; United Kingdom	Crosby, Stills, Nash & Young	Tour Of America			
February 23	United States; Canada; United Kingdom	Crosby, Stills, Nash & Young	Tour Of America			
March 15	United States; United Kingdom	Billy Joel; Elton John	Face to Face 2002	—N/a	18,799 / 19,325	$2,168,960
April 12	Mexico	Luis Miguel	Mis Romances Tour		13,029 / 13,742	$1,123,980
April 26	United Kingdom	Paul McCartney	Driving World Tour	—N/a	31,402 / 31,402	$4,050,500
April 27	United Kingdom	Paul McCartney	Driving World Tour	—N/a	31,402 / 31,402	$4,050,500
May 10	United States	Kid Rock	Cocky Tour	Lit	—N/a	
May 28	United States	Dave Matthews Band	2002 Spring Tour	Robert Randolph and the Family Band		
May 29	United States	Dave Matthews Band	2002 Spring Tour	Robert Randolph and the Family Band		
May 31	United States	Blink-182, Green Day	Pop Disaster Tour			
June 26	United States	Cher	Living Proof: The Farewell Tour	Cyndi Lauper	28,033 / 28,033	$2,083,396
June 27	United States	Cher	Living Proof: The Farewell Tour	Cyndi Lauper	28,033 / 28,033	$2,083,396
August 22	United States	Bruce Springsteen & The E Street Band	The Rising Tour	—N/a	18,725 / 18,725	$1,403,175
September 23	United States; United Kingdom	Billy Joel; Elton John	Face to Face 2002	—N/a	18,634 / 18,634	$2,141,030
September 26	United Kingdom	The Rolling Stones	Licks Tour	The Pretenders		
October 17	United States	Cher	Living Proof: The Farewell Tour	Cyndi Lauper	28,853 / 29,568	$2,177,228
October 18	United States	Cher	Living Proof: The Farewell Tour	Cyndi Lauper	28,853 / 29,568	$2,177,228
October 20	Canada	Rush	Vapor Trails Tour			
November 11	United States	Bob Dylan	Never Ending Tour 2002			
November 13	United States	Bob Dylan	Never Ending Tour 2002			
November 20	Colombia	Shakira	Tour of the Mongoose	—N/a	14,249 / 14,249	1,024,460
November 21	United Kingdom	Peter Gabriel	Growing Up Tour	The Blind Boys of Alabama	—N/a	
December 5	United States	Guns N' Roses	Chinese Democracy Tour		20,000 / 20,000	
December 12			Z-100 Jingle Ball			
December 20	United States	Dave Matthews Band	2002 Fall Tour	Karl Denson's Tiny Universe		
December 21	United States	Dave Matthews Band	2002 Fall Tour	Karl Denson's Tiny Universe		

2003

Entertainment events at Madison Square Garden
Date	Nationality	Artists	Tours	Supporting Acts	Attendance	Box Office
January 16	United Kingdom	The Rolling Stones	Licks Tour	Ryan Adams		
January 18	United Kingdom	The Rolling Stones	Licks Tour	Ryan Adams		
February 23	—N/a	45th Annual Grammy Awards		—N/a		
May 20	United States	Red Hot Chili Peppers	By the Way World Tour	Queens of the Stone Age; The Mars Volta		
June 11	United States	Cher	Living Proof: The Farewell Tour	Dom Irrera	29,776 / 29,776	$2,266,525
June 12	United States	Cher	Living Proof: The Farewell Tour	Dom Irrera	29,776 / 29,776	$2,266,525
June 13	United Kingdom	Coldplay	A Rush of Blood to the Head Tour	Ron Sexsmith	15,774 / 15,774	$582,760
July 8	United States	Pearl Jam	Riot Act Tour	Buzzcocks; Sleater-Kinney		
July 9	United States	Pearl Jam	Riot Act Tour	Buzzcocks; Sleater-Kinney		
July 30	United Kingdom	Iron Maiden	Give Me Ed... 'Til I'm Dead Tour	Dio; Motörhead	—N/a	
October 14	Canada	Shania Twain	Up! Tour	James Otto	15,706 / 19,018	$871,760
November 11	Mexico	Luis Miguel	33 Tour		12,123 / 13,102	$982,334
November 16	United States	Kiss; Aerosmith	Rocksimus Maximus Tour/World Domination Tour	Saliva	15,000 / 15,000	—N/a
December 11			Z-100 Jingle Ball			
December 15	United Kingdom	David Bowie	A Reality Tour	Macy Gray	13,752 / 13,572	$1,108,711
December 17	United States	Dave Matthews and Friends	2003 Fall Tour	Emmylou Harris		

2004

Entertainment events at Madison Square Garden
Date	Nationality	Artists	Tours	Supporting Acts	Attendance	Box Office
April 12	United States	Beyoncé; Alicia Keys; Missy Elliott	The Verizon Ladies First Tour	Tamia	13,725 / 13,725	$1,110,090
May 13	United Kingdom	Yes	35th Anniversary Tour			
May 22	United Kingdom	The Who	The Who Tour 2004	David Johansen		
June 16	United States	Madonna	Re-Invention World Tour		88,625 / 88,625	$12,674,925
June 17	United States	Madonna	Re-Invention World Tour		88,625 / 88,625	$12,674,925
June 20	United States	Madonna	Re-Invention World Tour		88,625 / 88,625	$12,674,925
June 21	United States	Madonna	Re-Invention World Tour		88,625 / 88,625	$12,674,925
June 23	United States	Madonna	Re-Invention World Tour		88,625 / 88,625	$12,674,925
June 24	United States	Madonna	Re-Invention World Tour		88,625 / 88,625	$12,674,925
June 25	United States	Incubus	2004 US Tour	Sparta		
June 28	United Kingdom	Eric Clapton	—N/a	Robert Randolph and the Family Band		
June 29	United Kingdom	Eric Clapton	—N/a	Robert Randolph and the Family Band		
June 30	United Kingdom	Eric Clapton	—N/a	Robert Randolph and the Family Band		
July 12	United States	Prince	Musicology Live 2004ever		57,023 / 57,023	$3,973,848
July 13	United States	Prince	Musicology Live 2004ever		57,023 / 57,023	$3,973,848
July 14	United States	Prince	Musicology Live 2004ever		57,023 / 57,023	$3,973,848
October 9	United States	Beastie Boys	Pageant Tour	Talib Kweli		
October 13	United States	Usher	Truth Tour	Kanye West; Christina Milian	26,658 / 26,658	$2,026,698
October 14	United States	Usher	Truth Tour	Kanye West; Christina Milian	26,658 / 26,658	$2,026,698
December 10			Z-100 Jingle Ball			

2005

Entertainment events at Madison Square Garden
Date	Nationality	Artists	Tours	Supporting Acts	Attendance	Box Office
May 21	Ireland	U2	Vertigo Tour	Kings of Leon	18,415 / 18,415	$1,907,086
June 22	United Kingdom	Oasis	Don't Believe The Truth Tour		Sold Out	
July 29	United States	Destiny's Child	Destiny Fulfilled... and Lovin' It	Teairra Marí		
August 8	United States	Eminem	Anger Management Tour	D12, Obie Trice, Stat Quo		
August 9	United States	Eminem	Anger Management Tour	D12, Obie Trice, Stat Quo		
September 6	United Kingdom	Coldplay	Twisted Logic Tour	Rilo Kiley	31,861 / 31,861	$1,767,792
September 7	United Kingdom	Coldplay	Twisted Logic Tour	Rilo Kiley	31,861 / 31,861	$1,767,792
September 13	United Kingdom	The Rolling Stones	A Bigger Bang Tour	Alanis Morissette		
September 20	—N/a	Hurricane Katrina Benefit Concert		—N/a		
September 21	United Kingdom	Elton John	Peachtree Road Tour	—N/a	46,708 / 46,708	$4,123,815
September 23	United Kingdom	Elton John	Peachtree Road Tour	—N/a	46,708 / 46,708	$4,123,815
September 24	United Kingdom	Elton John	Peachtree Road Tour	—N/a	46,708 / 46,708	$4,123,815
September 30	United Kingdom	Paul McCartney	The 'US' Tour	—N/a	63,867 / 63,867	$8,495,513
October 1	United Kingdom	Paul McCartney	The 'US' Tour	—N/a	63,867 / 63,867	$8,495,513
October 4	United Kingdom	Paul McCartney	The 'US' Tour	—N/a	63,867 / 63,867	$8,495,513
October 5	United Kingdom	Paul McCartney	The 'US' Tour	—N/a	63,867 / 63,867	$8,495,513
October 7	Ireland	U2	Vertigo Tour	Keane; Patti Smith	130,589 / 130,589	$13,517,837
October 8	Ireland	U2	Vertigo Tour	Keane; Patti Smith	130,589 / 130,589	$13,517,837
October 10	Ireland	U2	Vertigo Tour	Keane; Patti Smith	130,589 / 130,589	$13,517,837
October 11	Ireland	U2	Vertigo Tour	Keane; Patti Smith	130,589 / 130,589	$13,517,837
October 14	Ireland	U2	Vertigo Tour	Keane; Patti Smith	130,589 / 130,589	$13,517,837
October 23	Mexico	Luis Miguel	México En La Piel Tour		11,160 / 14,943	$1,082,931
November 28	United States	Bon Jovi	Have a Nice Day Tour		30,040 / 30,040	$2,420,274
November 29	United States	Bon Jovi	Have a Nice Day Tour		30,040 / 30,040	$2,420,274
December 9	United States	Dave Matthews Band	2005 Fall Tour	Soulive		
December 10	United States	Dave Matthews Band	2005 Fall Tour			
December 16			Z-100 Jingle Ball			
December 31	United States	The Black Crowes	All Join Hands	Trey Anastasio Band North Mississippi Allstars		

2006

Entertainment events at Madison Square Garden
Date	Nationality	Artists	Tours	Supporting Acts	Attendance	Box Office
January 18	United Kingdom	The Rolling Stones	A Bigger Bang Tour	Metric		
January 20	United Kingdom	The Rolling Stones	A Bigger Bang Tour	Metric		
January 23	United States	Billy Joel	2006 Tour			
January 26	United States	Billy Joel	2006 Tour			
February 2	United States	Billy Joel	2006 Tour			
February 4	South Korea	Rain	Rainy Day 2005 Tour	—N/a	12,000 / 12,000	—N/a
February 5	South Korea	Rain	Rainy Day 2005 Tour	—N/a	12,000 / 12,000	—N/a
February 9	United States	Billy Joel	2006 Tour			
February 11	United States	Billy Joel	2006 Tour			
February 16	United States	Billy Joel	2006 Tour			
February 25	United States	Billy Joel	2006 Tour			
February 27	United States	Billy Joel	2006 Tour			
March 2	United States	Billy Joel	2006 Tour			
March 4	United States	Billy Joel	2006 Tour			
April 19	United States	Billy Joel	2006 Tour			
April 24	United States	Billy Joel	2006 Tour			
June 22	United States	Bruce Springsteen & The Sessions Band	Seeger Sessions Tour	—N/a	12,945 / 12,945	$1,027,015
June 23	United States	Faith Hill; Tim McGraw	Soul2Soul II Tour			
June 24	United States	Faith Hill; Tim McGraw	Soul2Soul II Tour			
June 28	United States	Madonna	Confessions Tour	—N/a	91,841 / 91,841	$16,507,855
June 29	United States	Madonna	Confessions Tour	—N/a	91,841 / 91,841	$16,507,855
July 2	United States	Madonna	Confessions Tour	—N/a	91,841 / 91,841	$16,507,855
July 3	United States	Madonna	Confessions Tour	—N/a	91,841 / 91,841	$16,507,855
July 18	United States	Madonna	Confessions Tour	—N/a	91,841 / 91,841	$16,507,855
July 19	United States	Madonna	Confessions Tour	—N/a	91,841 / 91,841	$16,507,855
August 23	United States	Mariah Carey	The Adventures of Mimi	Sean Paul	13,930 / 13,930	$1,300,140
September 7	Colombia	Shakira	Oral Fixation Tour		31,035 / 31,035	$2,546,264
September 8	Colombia	Shakira	Oral Fixation Tour		31,035 / 31,035	$2,546,264
September 12	United Kingdom	Roger Waters	The Dark Side of the Moon Live	—N/a	29,488 / 29,488	$2,722,257
September 13	United Kingdom	Roger Waters	The Dark Side of the Moon Live	—N/a	29,488 / 29,488	$2,722,257
September 18	United Kingdom	The Who	The Who Tour 2006–2007	Peeping Tom	—N/a	
September 19	United Kingdom	The Who	The Who Tour 2006–2007	Peeping Tom	—N/a	
October 9	United States	Barbra Streisand	Streisand	—N/a	33,514 / 33,514	$11,313,050
October 11	United States	Barbra Streisand	Streisand	—N/a	33,514 / 33,514	$11,313,050
October 27	Australia	The Wiggles	Wiggledancing! Live on Stage	—N/a		
October 28	Australia	The Wiggles	Wiggledancing! Live on Stage	—N/a		
October 29	Australia	The Wiggles	Wiggledancing! Live on Stage	—N/a		
November 10	United States	Guns N' Roses	Chinese Democracy Tour		14,482 / 14,482	
December 1	United States	Tenacious D	The Pick of Destiny Tour	Neil Hamburger; Supafloss		

2007

Entertainment events at Madison Square Garden
Date	Nationality	Artists	Tours	Supporting Acts	Attendance	Box Office
February 7	United States	Justin Timberlake	FutureSex/LoveShow	Pink		
March 23	United States	Christina Aguilera	Back to Basics Tour	The Pussycat Dolls; Danity Kane		
March 25	United Kingdom	Elton John	The Captain and the Kid Tour			
August 1	United Kingdom	The Police	Reunion Tour	Fiction Plane	37,387 / 37,387	$4,753,610
August 3	United Kingdom	The Police	Reunion Tour	Fiction Plane	37,387 / 37,387	$4,753,610
August 4	United States	Beyoncé	The Beyoncé Experience	Robin Thicke	26,109 / 26,109	$2,744,345
August 5	United States	Beyoncé	The Beyoncé Experience	Robin Thicke	26,109 / 26,109	$2,744,345
August 15	United States	Justin Timberlake	FutureSex/LoveShow	Fergie	36,546 / 36,546	$2,784,912
August 16	United States	Justin Timberlake	FutureSex/LoveShow	Fergie	36,546 / 36,546	$2,784,912
September 1	United States	Aventura	Kings of Bachata			
September 25	United Kingdom	Genesis	Turn It On Again: The Tour	—N/a	12,752 / 12,752	$2,127,449
October 7	United States	Jennifer Lopez; Marc Anthony	En Concierto			
October 8	United States	Jennifer Lopez; Marc Anthony	En Concierto			
October 17	United States	Bruce Springsteen & The E Street Band	Magic Tour	—N/a	37,735 / 37,735	$3,604,315
October 18	United States	Bruce Springsteen & The E Street Band	Magic Tour	—N/a	37,735 / 37,735	$3,604,315
October 31	United Kingdom	The Police	Reunion Tour	Fiction Plane	34,961 / 34,961	$4,530,450
November 2	United Kingdom	The Police	Reunion Tour	Fiction Plane	34,961 / 34,961	$4,530,450

2008

Entertainment events at Madison Square Garden
Date	Nationality	Artists	Tours	Supporting Acts	Attendance	Box Office
February 18	United Kingdom	Spice Girls	The Return of the Spice Girls			
February 21	United States	Linkin Park	Minutes to Midnight World Tour	Coheed And Cambria; Chiodos	16,096 / 16,096	$808,469
May 2	United States	Mary J. Blige; Jay-Z	Heart of the City Tour	The-Dream		
May 6	United States	Mary J. Blige; Jay-Z	Heart of the City Tour	The-Dream		
May 7	United States	Mary J. Blige; Jay-Z	Heart of the City Tour	The-Dream		
May 9	United States	My Chemical Romance	The Black Parade World Tour			
May 15	United States	Kid Rock	Rock n Roll Revival Tour	Rev Run; Peter Wolf; Lynyrd Skynyrd		
May 28	United States	Eagles	Long Road Out of Eden Tour		38,182 / 38,182	$4,962,090
May 30	United States	Eagles	Long Road Out of Eden Tour		38,182 / 38,182	$4,962,090
May 31	United Kingdom	Iron Maiden	Somewhere Back in Time World Tour	Lauren Harris		
June 7	Puerto Rico	Wisin & Yandel	Los Extraterrestres World Tour			
June 18	United States	Alicia Keys	As I Am Tour	Ne-Yo		
June 23	United Kingdom	Coldplay	Viva la Vida Tour	The Blue Jackets		
July 14	United States	Bon Jovi	Lost Highway Tour		36,536 / 36,536	$4,079,017
July 15	United States	Bon Jovi	Lost Highway Tour		36,536 / 36,536	$4,079,017
July 21	United Kingdom	George Michael	25 Live			
July 23	United Kingdom	George Michael	25 Live			
August 7	United Kingdom	The Police	Reunion Tour	The B-52's	18,348 / 18,348	$2,754,050
September 10	United States	Dave Matthews Band	Stand Up for a Cure	Ingrid Michaelson		
September 15	Canada	Celine Dion	Taking Chances World Tour		36,291 / 36,291	$4,476,480
September 16	Canada	Celine Dion	Taking Chances World Tour		36,291 / 36,291	$4,476,480
October 6	United States	Madonna	Sticky & Sweet Tour	Paul Oakenfold	61,586 / 61,586	$11,527,375
October 7	United States	Madonna	Sticky & Sweet Tour	Paul Oakenfold	61,586 / 61,586	$11,527,375
October 11	United States	Madonna	Sticky & Sweet Tour	Paul Oakenfold	61,586 / 61,586	$11,527,375
October 12	United States	Madonna	Sticky & Sweet Tour	Paul Oakenfold	61,586 / 61,586	$11,527,375
November 1	United States	Janet Jackson	Rock Witchu Tour	DJ Juan	9,955 / 12,029	$799,082
November 12	Australia	AC/DC	Black Ice World Tour	The Answer	28,136 / 28,136	$2,465,450
November 13	Australia	AC/DC	Black Ice World Tour	The Answer	28,136 / 28,136	$2,465,450
December 1	United States	Tina Turner	Tina!: 50th Anniversary Tour		13,887 / 13,887	$1,782,685
December 15	Canada	Neil Young	North American Tour 2008	Wilco; Everest		
December 16	Canada	Neil Young	North American Tour 2008	Wilco; Everest		
December 17	United Kingdom	Oasis	Dig Out Your Soul Tour	Ryan Adams & the Cardinals; Matt Costa		

2009

Entertainment events at Madison Square Garden
Date	Nationality	Artists	Tours	Supporting Acts	Attendance	Box Office
February 5	United States	Slipknot	All Hope Is Gone World Tour	Coheed and Cambria Trivium		
April 14	United States	Dave Matthews Band	2009 Spring Tour	The Roots		
May 3	United States	Dave Matthews Band	The Clearwater Concert			
June 21	United States	Beyoncé	I Am... World Tour	RichGirl	27,580 / 27,580	$3,526,375
June 22	United States	Beyoncé	I Am... World Tour	RichGirl	27,580 / 27,580	$3,526,375
July 27	United States	Green Day	21st Century Breakdown World Tour	Kaiser Chiefs		
July 28	United States	Green Day	21st Century Breakdown World Tour	Kaiser Chiefs		
August 7	Guatemala	Ricardo Arjona	Quinto Piso Tour	—N/a	9,142 / 12,896	$1,013,711
August 24	United States	Britney Spears	Circus Tour	Jordin Sparks; Kristinia DeBarge; One Call	53,356 / 53,356	$3,814,089
August 25	United States	Britney Spears	Circus Tour	Jordin Sparks; Kristinia DeBarge; One Call	53,356 / 53,356	$3,814,089
August 26	United States	Britney Spears	Circus Tour	Jordin Sparks; Kristinia DeBarge; One Call	53,356 / 53,356	$3,814,089
August 27	United States	Taylor Swift	Fearless Tour	Gloriana; Kellie Pickler	13,597 / 13,597	$976,062
October 2	Puerto Rico	Wisin & Yandel	La Revolución World Tour			
October 5	United States	Pink	Funhouse Tour	The Ting Tings	15,056 / 15,056	$909,149
October 10	United States	Kiss	Alive 35 World Tour	Buckcherry		
November 7	United States	Bruce Springsteen & The E Street Band	Working on a Dream Tour	—N/a	37,064 / 37,064	$3,459,026
November 8	United States	Bruce Springsteen & The E Street Band	Working on a Dream Tour	—N/a	37,064 / 37,064	$3,459,026
November 14	United States	Metallica	World Magnetic Tour	Volbeat; Lamb of God		$2,539,232
November 15	United States	Metallica	World Magnetic Tour	Volbeat; Lamb of God		$2,539,232
December 2	United States	Phish	Fall Tour 2009			
December 3	United States	Phish	Fall Tour 2009			
December 4	United States	Phish	Fall Tour 2009			
December 31	United States	Mariah Carey	Angels Advocate Tour	Trey Songz	11,534 / 11,831	$1,224,734

== 2010s ==
2010

Entertainment events at Madison Square Garden
Date	Nationality	Artists	Tours	Supporting Acts	Attendance	Box Office
March 17	United States	Alicia Keys	The Freedom Tour	Melanie Fiona; Robin Thicke		
May 20	United States	Pearl Jam	Backspacer Tour	Band of Horses; The Black Keys		
May 21	United States	Pearl Jam	Backspacer Tour	Band of Horses; The Black Keys		
July 6	United States	Lady Gaga	The Monster Ball Tour	Semi Precious Weapons	45,461 / 45,461	$5,083,454
July 7	United States	Lady Gaga	The Monster Ball Tour	Semi Precious Weapons	45,461 / 45,461	$5,083,454
July 9	United States	Lady Gaga	The Monster Ball Tour	Semi Precious Weapons	45,461 / 45,461	$5,083,454
July 12	United Kingdom	Iron Maiden	The Final Frontier World Tour	Dream Theater	13,312 / 13,312	$1,030,584
August 12	Barbados	Rihanna	Last Girl on Earth Tour	Ke$ha; Travie McCoy; DJ Brian Dawe	14,331 / 14,331	$1,271,547
August 31	Canada	Justin Bieber	My World Tour	—N/a	14,529 / 14,529	$378,946
September 4	Brazil	Ivete Sangalo	Multishow ao Vivo: Ivete Sangalo no Madison Square Garden	—N/a	14,577 / 14,577	$965,137
September 21	Colombia	Shakira	The Sun Comes Out World Tour	—N/a	14,144 / 14,144	$1,322,713
October 5	United Kingdom	Roger Waters	The Wall Live	—N/a	36,704 / 36,704	$5,449,885
October 6	United Kingdom	Roger Waters	The Wall Live	—N/a	36,704 / 36,704	$5,449,885
October 8	United Kingdom	Gorillaz	Escape to Plastic Beach Tour	N.E.R.D.		
October 20	France	Phoenix	Wolfgang Amadeus Phoenix Tour	Dirty Projectors; Wavves; Daft Punk (Surprise Act)		
November 6	United Kingdom	Roger Waters	The Wall Live	—N/a	12,498 / 12,498	$1,902,115
November 12	United States	Dave Matthews Band	2010 Fall Tour	John Butler Trio		
November 13	United States	Dave Matthews Band	2010 Fall Tour	John Butler Trio		
December 11	Germany	Rammstein	Liebe ist für alle da Tour			
December 13	United States	Usher	OMG Tour	Trey Songz; Miguel	29,462 / 29,462	$2,567,864
December 14	United States	Usher	OMG Tour	Trey Songz; Miguel	29,462 / 29,462	$2,567,864
December 18	United States	Prince	Welcome 2 America	Graham Central Station	—N/a	
December 29	United States	Prince	Welcome 2 America	Janelle Monáe; Mint Condition	—N/a	

2011

Entertainment events at Madison Square Garden
Date	Nationality	Artists	Tours	Supporting Acts	Attendance	Box Office
January 18	United States	Prince	Welcome 2 America	Sharon Jones & the Dap-Kings	70,855 / 72,911	$7,592,092
February 4	United States	Linkin Park	A Thousand Suns World Tour	Pendulum, Does It Offend You, Yeah?	15,170 / 15,170	$812,120
February 7	United States	Prince	Welcome 2 America	CeeLo Green	—N/a	
February 21	United States	Lady Gaga	The Monster Ball Tour	Scissor Sisters	28,949 / 28,949	$3,211,580
February 22	United States	Lady Gaga	The Monster Ball Tour	Scissor Sisters	28,949 / 28,949	$3,211,580
March 16	United Kingdom	Elton John	Greatest Hits Tour	2Cellos	36,338 / 36,338	$3,471,360
March 20	United Kingdom	Elton John	Greatest Hits Tour	2Cellos	36,338 / 36,338	$3,471,360
October 23	South Korea	SM Town: BoA; f(x); Girls' Generation; Kangta; Shinee; Super Junior (except Heechul and Siwon); Super Junior-M; TVXQ (only Max and U-Know)	SM Town Live '10 World Tour	—N/a	15,000	$1,600,000
November 7	United States	Jay-Z; Kanye West	Watch the Throne Tour	—N/a	27,649 / 27,649	$4,330,393
November 8	United States	Jay-Z; Kanye West	Watch the Throne Tour	—N/a	27,649 / 27,649	$4,330,393
November 16	United States	Katy Perry	California Dreams Tour	Ellie Goulding	—N/a	
November 21	United States	Taylor Swift	Speak Now World Tour	Needtobreathe; Adam Brand	26,652 / 26,652	$1,988,411
November 22	United States	Taylor Swift	Speak Now World Tour	Needtobreathe; Adam Brand	26,652 / 26,652	$1,988,411
December 16	Sweden	Swedish House Mafia	—N/a	A-Trak; Jacques Lu Cont	20,000 / 20,000	—N/a

2012

Entertainment events at Madison Square Garden
Date	Nationality	Artists	Tours	Supporting Acts	Attendance	Box Office
February 11	United States	Romeo Santos	The King Stays King	—N/a		
February 22	United States	Romeo Santos	The King Stays King	—N/a		
February 23	United States	Romeo Santos	The King Stays King	—N/a		
February 26	Guatemala	Ricardo Arjona	Metamorfosis World Tour	—N/a	13,556 / 13,556	$1,282,356
February 28	United States	Van Halen	A Different Kind of Truth Tour	Kool & The Gang	—N/a	
March 1	United States	Van Halen	A Different Kind of Truth Tour	Kool & The Gang	—N/a	
March 12	United States	The Black Keys	El Camino Tour	Arctic Monkeys	—N/a	
March 22	United States	The Black Keys	El Camino Tour	Arctic Monkeys	—N/a	
March 25	Japan	L'Arc-en-Ciel	L'Arc~en~Ciel WORLD TOUR 2012	—N/a		
April 6	United States	Bruce Springsteen & The E Street Band	Wrecking Ball World Tour	—N/a	38,828 / 38,828	$3,524,874
April 9	United States	Bruce Springsteen & The E Street Band	Wrecking Ball World Tour	—N/a	38,828 / 38,828	$3,524,874
November 12	United States	Madonna	The MDNA Tour	Martin Solveig	24,790 / 24,790	$4,846,665
November 13	United States	Madonna	The MDNA Tour	Martin Solveig	24,790 / 24,790	$4,846,665
November 20	United States	Aerosmith	Global Warming Tour	Cheap Trick	11,894 / 13,173	$1,014,769
November 28	Canada	Justin Bieber	Believe Tour	Carly Rae Jepsen; The Wanted	29,680 / 29,680	$2,390,196
November 29	Canada	Justin Bieber	Believe Tour	Carly Rae Jepsen; The Wanted	29,680 / 29,680	$2,390,196
December 3	United Kingdom	One Direction	Up All Night Tour	—N/a		
December 12	—N/a	12-12-12: The Concert for Sandy Relief		—N/a		

2013

Entertainment events at Madison Square Garden
Date	Nationality	Artists	Tours	Supporting Acts	Attendance	Box Office
February 9	Guatemala	Ricardo Arjona	Metamorfosis World Tour	—N/a	11,905 / 11,905	$1,371,732
February 16	United States	Maroon 5	Overexposed Tour	Neon Trees; Owl City	—N/a	
March 22	United States	Pink	The Truth About Love Tour	The Hives	14,131 / 14,131	$1,347,083
March 30	Netherlands	Armin van Buuren	A State of Trance 600			
April 11	United States	Alicia Keys	Set the World on Fire Tour	Miguel	—N/a	
November 23	United States	Kanye West	The Yeezus Tour	Kendrick Lamar; A Tribe Called Quest	—N/a	
November 24	United States	Kanye West	The Yeezus Tour	Kendrick Lamar; A Tribe Called Quest	—N/a	
December 3	United Kingdom	Elton John	The Diving Board Tour	—N/a	36,196 / 36,196	$3,852,856
December 4	United Kingdom	Elton John	The Diving Board Tour	—N/a	36,196 / 36,196	$3,852,856

2014

Entertainment events at Madison Square Garden
Date	Nationality	Artists	Tours	Supporting Acts	Attendance	Box Office
February 8	United Kingdom	Arctic Monkeys	AM Tour	Deerhunter	14,262 / 14,262	
February 15	Spain	Enrique Iglesias	Sex and Love Tour	—N/a	15,070 / 15,070	$1,285,055
February 20	United States	Justin Timberlake	The 20/20 Experience World Tour	DJ Freestyle Steve	27,763 / 27,763	$3,663,790
February 21	United States	Justin Timberlake	The 20/20 Experience World Tour	DJ Freestyle Steve	27,763 / 27,763	$3,663,790
March 22	Taiwan	Mayday	Nowhere Tour	—N/a		
April 11	Netherlands	Armin van Buuren	Armin Only: Intense tour			
May 13	United States	Lady Gaga	Artrave: The Artpop Ball	Lady Starlight; Hatsune Miku	14,326 / 14,326	$1,625,812
July 9	United States	Katy Perry	The Prismatic World Tour	Capital Cities; Ferras	13,846 / 13,846	$2,047,284
July 14	United States	Bruno Mars	The Moonshine Jungle Tour	Pharrell Williams	31,434 / 31,434	$3,453,499
July 15	United States	Bruno Mars	The Moonshine Jungle Tour	Pharrell Williams	31,434 / 31,434	$3,453,499
July 17	United Kingdom; United States	Queen + Adam Lambert	Queen + Adam Lambert Tour 2014–2015	—N/a	14,007 / 14,007	$1,249,871
September 25	Spain	Enrique Iglesias	Sex and Love Tour	Pitbull	15,019 / 15,019	$1,775,806
September 27	Sweden	Eric Prydz	Eric Prydz in Concert EPIC 3.0	—N/a		
October 6	United Kingdom; United States	Fleetwood Mac	On with the Show Tour	—N/a		
October 7	United Kingdom; United States	Fleetwood Mac	On with the Show Tour	—N/a		
October 11	Japan	X Japan	X Japan Live at Madison Square Garden	—N/a		
November 6	United States	Stevie Wonder	Songs in the Key of Life Tour	—N/a		
November 7	United States	Usher	UR Experience Tour	DJ Cassidy; August Alsina	—N/a	
November 15	Netherlands	Hardwell	I Am Hardwell World Tour			

2015

Entertainment events at Madison Square Garden
Date	Nationality	Artists	Tours	Supporting Acts	Attendance	Box Office
January 15	United Kingdom	Sam Smith	In the Lonely Hour Tour	George Ezra	14,282 / 14,282	$757,230
January 22	United Kingdom; United States	Fleetwood Mac	On with the Show Tour	—N/a		
March 5	United States	Maroon 5	Maroon V Tour	Magic! Rozzi Crane	29,998 / 29,998	$2,852,671
March 6	United States	Maroon 5	Maroon V Tour	Magic! Rozzi Crane	29,998 / 29,998	$2,852,671
March 8	Guatemala	Ricardo Arjona	Viaje Tour	—N/a		
March 20	United States	Ariana Grande	The Honeymoon Tour	Cashmere Cat; Rixton	28,520 / 28,520	$1,445,122
June 27	United Kingdom	Morrissey		Blondie		
June 29	Canada	Rush	R40 Live Tour	—N/a	13,554 / 13,554	$1,507,393
June 30	Canada	Shania Twain	Rock This Country Tour	Gavin DeGraw	12,396 / 12,396	$1,425,828
July 18	Ireland	U2	Innocence + Experience Tour	—N/a	149,942 / 149,942	$19,474,285
July 19	Ireland	U2	Innocence + Experience Tour	—N/a	149,942 / 149,942	$19,474,285
July 22	Ireland	U2	Innocence + Experience Tour	—N/a	149,942 / 149,942	$19,474,285
July 23	Ireland	U2	Innocence + Experience Tour	—N/a	149,942 / 149,942	$19,474,285
July 26	Ireland	U2	Innocence + Experience Tour	—N/a	149,942 / 149,942	$19,474,285
July 27	Ireland	U2	Innocence + Experience Tour	—N/a	149,942 / 149,942	$19,474,285
July 30	Ireland	U2	Innocence + Experience Tour	—N/a	149,942 / 149,942	$19,474,285
July 31	Ireland	U2	Innocence + Experience Tour	—N/a	149,942 / 149,942	$19,474,285
August 5	United States	J. Cole	2014 Forest Hills Drive	YG; Big Sean; Jhene Aiko	12,683/ 12,683	$1,230,985
September 5	Guatemala	Ricardo Arjona	Viaje Tour	—N/a		
September 16	United States	Madonna	Rebel Heart Tour	Amy Schumer	28,371 / 28,371	$5,230,985
September 17	United States	Madonna	Rebel Heart Tour	Amy Schumer	28,371 / 28,371	$5,230,985
October 8	Puerto Rico	Ricky Martin	One World Tour	Wisin	—N/a	
October 23	United Kingdom	Blur	The Magic Whip Tour			
November 16	Canada	The Weeknd	The Madness Fall Tour	Banks; Travis Scott	14,817 / 14,817	$1,299,553
November 24	United States	Stevie Wonder	Songs in the Key of Life Tour	—N/a		
December 30	United States	Phish	Phish Tour 2015-2016	—N/a		
December 31	United States	Phish	Phish Tour 2015-2016	—N/a		

2016

Entertainment events at Madison Square Garden
Date	Nationality	Artists	Tours	Supporting Acts	Attendance	Box Office
January 1	United States	Phish	Phish Tour 2015-2016	—N/a		
January 2	United States	Phish	Phish Tour 2015-2016	—N/a		
January 7	United States	Billy Joel	Billy Joel at The Garden	—N/a		
January 27	United States	Bruce Springsteen and the E Street Band	The River Tour 2016	—N/a	18,474 / 18,474	$2,508,528
February 13	United States	Billy Joel	Billy Joel at The Garden	—N/a		
February 19	United States	Hall & Oates		Mayer Hawthorne; Sharon Jones & The Dap-Kings	—N/a	
February 25	United Kingdom	Black Sabbath	The End Tour	Rival Sons	29,411 / 29,411	$3,471,530
February 27	United Kingdom	Black Sabbath	The End Tour	Rival Sons	29,411 / 29,411	$3,471,530
March 3	United Kingdom	The Who	The Who Hits 50!	Joan Jett and the Blackhearts	14,863 / 14,863	$1,597,504
March 4	United States	Fall Out Boy	Wintour is Coming	PVRIS; Awolnation	13,940 / 13,940	$726,377
March 28	United States	Bruce Springsteen and the E Street Band	The River Tour 2016	—N/a	18,484 / 18,484	$2,508,003
March 30	United Kingdom	Iron Maiden	The Book of Souls World Tour	The Raven Age	13,289 / 13,289	$1,472,331
April 8	United States	The Avett Brothers	Spring Tour 2016	Brandi Carlile	—N/a	
April 11	United Kingdom	David Gilmour	Rattle That Lock Tour	—N/a	28,160 / 28,160	$3,941,985
April 12	United Kingdom	David Gilmour	Rattle That Lock Tour	—N/a	28,160 / 28,160	$3,941,985
April 13	Mexico; United States	Journey; Santana	—N/a	—N/a	—N/a	—N/a
April 15	United States	Billy Joel	Billy Joel at the Garden	—N/a	—N/a	—N/a
April 18	United States	Chicago; Earth Wind & Fire	Heart and Soul 2.0	—N/a	—N/a	—N/a
May 1	United States	Pearl Jam	Pearl Jam 2016 North America Tour	—N/a	—N/a	—N/a
May 2	United States	Pearl Jam	Pearl Jam 2016 North America Tour	—N/a	—N/a	—N/a
June 21	United Kingdom	Ellie Goulding	Delirium World Tour	Years & Years; Cedric Gervais	12,998 / 12,998	—N/a
June 30	United Kingdom	The Stone Roses	Reunion Tour			
July 15	Australia	5 Seconds of Summer	Sounds Live Feels Live World Tour	One Ok Rock; Hey Violet	12,660 / 12,914	$771,186
July 17	United States	Billy Joel	Billy Joel at the Garden	—N/a		
July 18	Canada	Justin Bieber	Purpose World Tour	Post Malone; Moxie Raia	29,425 / 29,425	$3,340,025
July 19	Canada	Justin Bieber	Purpose World Tour	Post Malone; Moxie Raia	29,425 / 29,425	$3,340,025
August 4	Canada; United States	Drake; Future	Summer Sixteen Tour	Roy Wood$ dvsn	58,085 / 58,085	$6,804,352
August 5	Canada; United States	Drake; Future	Summer Sixteen Tour	Roy Wood$ dvsn	58,085 / 58,085	$6,804,352
August 6	Canada; United States	Drake; Future	Summer Sixteen Tour	Roy Wood$ dvsn	58,085 / 58,085	$6,804,352
August 8	Canada; United States	Drake; Future	Summer Sixteen Tour	Roy Wood$ dvsn	58,085 / 58,085	$6,804,352
August 10	United States	Twenty One Pilots	Emotional Roadshow World Tour	Mutemath; Chef'Special	24,661 / 24,661	$1,184,446
August 11	United States	Twenty One Pilots	Emotional Roadshow World Tour	Mutemath; Chef'Special	24,661 / 24,661	$1,184,446
August 13	United States	Halsey	Badlands Tour	Oh Wonder	12,776 / 12,776	$501,282
August 28	—N/a	2016 MTV Video Music Awards		—N/a		
September 5	United States	Kanye West	Saint Pablo Tour	—N/a	37,005 / 37,005	$4,852,888
September 6	United States	Kanye West	Saint Pablo Tour	—N/a	37,005 / 37,005	$4,852,888
September 10	Canada	Shawn Mendes	2016 World Tour	—N/a	12,828 / 12,828	$674,353
September 14	Australia	AC/DC	Rock or Bust World Tour	Vintage Trouble	13,737 / 13,737	$1,555,320
September 19	United Kingdom	Adele	2016 World Tour	—N/a	86,652 / 86,652	$9,829,597
September 20	United Kingdom	Adele	2016 World Tour	—N/a	86,652 / 86,652	$9,829,597
September 22	United Kingdom	Adele	2016 World Tour	—N/a	86,652 / 86,652	$9,829,597
September 23	United Kingdom	Adele	2016 World Tour	—N/a	86,652 / 86,652	$9,829,597
September 25	United Kingdom	Adele	2016 World Tour	—N/a	86,652 / 86,652	$9,829,597
September 26	United Kingdom	Adele	2016 World Tour	—N/a	86,652 / 86,652	$9,829,597
October 25	United States	Carrie Underwood	Storyteller Tour: Stories in the Round	Easton Corbin; The Swon Brothers	17,815 / 17,815	$1,362,263
December 15	Italy	Andrea Bocelli	Cinema World Tour	—N/a		

2017

Entertainment events at Madison Square Garden
Date	Nationality	Artists	Tours	Supporting Acts	Attendance	Box Office
January 11	United States	Billy Joel	Billy Joel in Concert	—N/a		
January 20	United States	Kings of Leon	Walls Tour	Deerhunter	—N/a	
February 2	United States	The Lumineers	Cleopatra World Tour	Andrew Bird	28,214 / 28,214	$1,412,311
February 3	United States	The Lumineers	Cleopatra World Tour	Andrew Bird	28,214 / 28,214	$1,412,311
February 15	United States	Red Hot Chili Peppers	The Getaway World Tour	Trombone Shorty and Orleans Avenue; Jack Irons	45,218 / 45,218	$4,287,735
February 17	United States	Red Hot Chili Peppers	The Getaway World Tour	Trombone Shorty and Orleans Avenue; Jack Irons	45,218 / 45,218	$4,287,735
February 18	United States	Red Hot Chili Peppers	The Getaway World Tour	Trombone Shorty and Orleans Avenue; Jack Irons	45,218 / 45,218	$4,287,735
February 22	United States	Billy Joel	Billy Joel in Concert	—N/a	—N/a	—N/a
February 23	United States	Ariana Grande	Dangerous Woman Tour	Victoria Monét; Little Mix	26,635 / 26,635	$2,923,027
February 24	United States	Ariana Grande	Dangerous Woman Tour	Victoria Monét; Little Mix	26,635 / 26,635	$2,923,027
March 1	United States	Luke Bryan	Kill the Lights Tour	Brett Eldredge	14,981 / 14,981	$1,086,993
March 2	United States	Panic! at the Disco	Death of a Bachelor Tour	MisterWives; Saint Motel	14,468 / 14,468	$816,524
March 3	United States	Billy Joel	Billy Joel in Concert	—N/a	—N/a	—N/a
March 7	—N/a		Game of Thrones Live Concert Experience	—N/a	14,633 / 17,046	$1,237,251
March 19	United Kingdom	Eric Clapton		Gary Clark Jr. Jimmie Vaughan	—N/a	—N/a
March 20	United Kingdom	Eric Clapton		Gary Clark Jr. Jimmie Vaughan	—N/a	—N/a
April 7	United States	Bon Jovi	This House is Not for Sale Tour	Oak & Ash	33,773 / 36,542	$4,142,783
April 8	United States	Bon Jovi	This House is Not for Sale Tour	Dylan Rockoff	33,773 / 36,542	$4,142,783
April 14	United States	Billy Joel	Billy Joel in Concert	—N/a	—N/a	—N/a
June 1	England	The 1975	I Like It When You Sleep, for You Are So Beautiful yet So Unaware of It Tour	Pale Waves	13,330 / 13,330	$656,018
June 15	United States	Neil Diamond	Neil Diamond 50th Anniversary Tour	—N/a	27,303 / 31,488	$3,306,191
June 17	United States	Neil Diamond	Neil Diamond 50th Anniversary Tour	—N/a	27,303 / 31,488	$3,306,191
July 21	United States	Phish	The Baker's Dozen	—N/a	227,385 / 236,278	$15,041,405
July 22	United States	Phish	The Baker's Dozen	—N/a	227,385 / 236,278	$15,041,405
July 23	United States	Phish	The Baker's Dozen	—N/a	227,385 / 236,278	$15,041,405
July 25	United States	Phish	The Baker's Dozen	—N/a	227,385 / 236,278	$15,041,405
July 26	United States	Phish	The Baker's Dozen	—N/a	227,385 / 236,278	$15,041,405
July 28	United States	Phish	The Baker's Dozen	—N/a	227,385 / 236,278	$15,041,405
July 29	United States	Phish	The Baker's Dozen	—N/a	227,385 / 236,278	$15,041,405
July 30	United States	Phish	The Baker's Dozen	—N/a	227,385 / 236,278	$15,041,405
August 1	United States	Phish	The Baker's Dozen	—N/a	227,385 / 236,278	$15,041,405
August 2	United States	Phish	The Baker's Dozen	—N/a	227,385 / 236,278	$15,041,405
August 4	United States	Phish	The Baker's Dozen	—N/a	227,385 / 236,278	$15,041,405
August 5	United States	Phish	The Baker's Dozen	—N/a	227,385 / 236,278	$15,041,405
August 6	United States	Phish	The Baker's Dozen	—N/a	227,385 / 236,278	$15,041,405
August 19	United States	Lionel Richie; Mariah Carey	All the Hits Tour	Tauren Wells	14,379 / 14,505	$1,168,544
September 15	United Kingdom	Paul McCartney	One on One Tour	—N/a	30,213 / 30,213 (Note: The score data for the shows held at Madison Square Garden in New York on 15 and 17 September 2017 is available only as a two-show total.)	$6,448,272
September 16	Germany	Scorpions	Crazy World Tour	Megadeth	11,000 / 12,500	$766,456
September 17	United Kingdom	Paul McCartney	One on One Tour	—N/a	—	—
September 22	United States	Bruno Mars	24K Magic World Tour	Dua Lipa	31,318 / 31,318	$4,120,197
September 23	United States	Bruno Mars	24K Magic World Tour	Dua Lipa	31,318 / 31,318	$4,120,197
October 2	United States	Katy Perry	Witness: The Tour	Noah Cyrus	21,688 / 22,667	$2,618,096
October 6	United States	Katy Perry	Witness: The Tour	Noah Cyrus	21,688 / 22,667	$2,618,096
October 11	United States	Guns N' Roses	Not in This Lifetime... Tour	—N/a	41,818 / 41,818	$6,160,000
October 12	Guatemala	Ricardo Arjona	Circo Soledad: La Gira			
October 15	United States	Guns N' Roses	Not in This Lifetime... Tour	—N/a		
October 16	United States	Guns N' Roses	Not in This Lifetime... Tour	—N/a		

2018

Entertainment events at Madison Square Garden
Date	Nationality	Artists	Tours	Supporting Acts	Attendance	Box Office
January 28	—N/a	60th Annual Grammy Awards		—N/a		
February 23	Guatemala	Ricardo Arjona	Circo Soledad: La Gira	—N/a		
March 22	United States	Justin Timberlake	The Man of the Woods Tour	The Shadowboxers	17,288 / 17,288	$2,867,064
April 4	United States	Pink	Beautiful Trauma World Tour	KidCutUp; Bleachers	30,286 / 30,286	$5,320,560
April 5	United States	Pink	Beautiful Trauma World Tour	KidCutUp; Bleachers	30,286 / 30,286	$5,320,560
June 13	United Kingdom; United States	Def Leppard; Journey	Def Leppard & Journey 2018 Tour	—N/a	12,407 / 12,407	$1,605,251
June 16	United States	Logic	Logic Presents: Bobby Tarantino vs. Everybody tour with NF and Kyle	NF Kyle	TBA	TBA
June 25	Ireland	U2	Experience + Innocence Tour	—N/a	55,575 / 55,575 (Note: The score data for the shows held at Madison Square Garden in New York on 25–26 June and 1 July 2018 is available only as a three-show total.)	$8,705,673
June 26	Ireland	U2	Experience + Innocence Tour	—N/a	55,575 / 55,575	$8,705,673
June 29	United Kingdom	Sam Smith	The Thrill of It All Tour		25,741 / 26,662	$2,331,605
June 30	United Kingdom	Sam Smith	The Thrill of It All Tour		25,741 / 26,662	$2,331,605
July 1	Ireland	U2	Experience + Innocence Tour	—N/a	—	—
July 16	United States	Foo Fighters	Concrete and Gold Tour	The Struts	—N/a	
July 17	United States	Foo Fighters	Concrete and Gold Tour	The Struts	—N/a	
August 1	United States	The Smashing Pumpkins	Shiny And Oh So Bright Tour	—N/a	—	—
August 10	Colombia	Shakira	El Dorado World Tour	Salva	12,921 / 12,921	$2,003,172
August 24	Canada; United States	Drake; Migos	Aubrey & the Three Migos Tour	Roy Woods	67,446 / 67,446	$8,992,078
August 25	Canada; United States	Drake; Migos	Aubrey & the Three Migos Tour	Roy Woods	67,446 / 67,446	$8,992,078
August 27	Canada; United States	Drake; Migos	Aubrey & the Three Migos Tour	Roy Woods	67,446 / 67,446	$8,992,078
August 28	Canada; United States	Drake; Migos	Aubrey & the Three Migos Tour	Roy Woods	67,446 / 67,446	$8,992,078
October 1	United States	J. Cole	KOD Tour			
October 14	United States	Maroon 5	Red Pill Blues Tour	Julia Michaels	28,275 / 28,275	$3,660,043
October 15	United States	Maroon 5	Red Pill Blues Tour	Julia Michaels	28,275 / 28,275	$3,660,043
October 18	United Kingdom	Elton John	Farewell Yellow Brick Road	—N/a	29,435 / 29,435	$4,846,015
October 19	United Kingdom	Elton John	Farewell Yellow Brick Road	—N/a	29,435 / 29,435	$4,846,015
October 22	United States	Justin Timberlake	The Man of the Woods Tour	Francesco Yates	17,690 / 17,690	$2,832,189
November 8	United Kingdom	Elton John	Farewell Yellow Brick Road		29,514 / 29,514	$5,178,733
November 9	United Kingdom	Elton John	Farewell Yellow Brick Road		29,514 / 29,514	$5,178,733
November 29	United States	Dave Matthews Band	2018 Fall Tour			
November 30	United States	Dave Matthews Band	2018 Fall Tour			

2019

Entertainment events at Madison Square Garden
Date	Nationality	Artists	Tours	Supporting Acts	Attendance	Box Office
January 31	United States	Justin Timberlake	The Man of the Woods Tour	—N/a	18,522 / 18,522	$2,774,525
March 5	United Kingdom	Elton John	Farewell Yellow Brick Road	—N/a	29,821 / 29,821	$5,249,700
March 6	United Kingdom	Elton John	Farewell Yellow Brick Road	—N/a	29,821 / 29,821	$5,249,700
March 8	Sweden	Robyn	Honey Tour	—N/a	12,806 / 12,806	$1,121,530
March 11	United States; United Kingdom	Fleetwood Mac	An Evening with Fleetwood Mac	—N/a	30,912 / 30,912	$4,769,179
March 18	United States; United Kingdom	Fleetwood Mac	An Evening with Fleetwood Mac	—N/a	30,912 / 30,912	$4,769,179
March 27	United States	Kiss	End of the Road World Tour	David Garibaldi	13,359 / 13,359	$1,730,755
May 21	United States	Pink	Beautiful Trauma World Tour	Julia Michaels; KidCutUp	29,997 / 29,997	$5,527,014
May 22	United States	Pink	Beautiful Trauma World Tour	Julia Michaels; KidCutUp	29,997 / 29,997	$5,527,014
June 18	United States	Ariana Grande	Sweetener World Tour	Normani; Social House	28,576 / 28,576	$5,492,909
June 19	United States	Ariana Grande	Sweetener World Tour	Normani; Social House	28,576 / 28,576	$5,492,909
July 12	United States	Jennifer Lopez	It's My Party Tour	Briar Nolet; Swing Latino	28,066 / 28,066	$5,536,127
July 15	United States	Jennifer Lopez	It's My Party Tour	Briar Nolet; Swing Latino	28,066 / 28,066	$5,536,127
August 29	United States	Jonas Brothers	Happiness Begins Tour	Jordan McGraw Bebe Rexha	29,812 / 29,812	$5,210,049
August 30	United States	Jonas Brothers	Happiness Begins Tour	Jordan McGraw Bebe Rexha	29,812 / 29,812	$5,210,049
September 6	United States	Vampire Weekend	Father of the Bride Tour	Despot Angélique Kidjo	N/A	N/A
September 21	United States	Illenium	Ascend Tour	Adventure Club Said the Sky Dabin	N/A	N/A
September 28	United States	Vulfpeck		The Fearless Flyers		
October 2	United States	Carrie Underwood	Cry Pretty Tour 360	Maddie & Tae; Runaway June	17,815 / 17,815	$1,362,263
October 6	United Kingdom	Phil Collins	Not Dead Yet Tour	—N/a	26,568 / 26,568	$4,202,395
October 7	United Kingdom	Phil Collins	Not Dead Yet Tour	—N/a	26,568 / 26,568	$4,202,395
November 9	United States	Slayer	Final World Tour	Primus, Ministry, Phil Anselmo and the Illegals		
November 14	United States	Post Malone	Runaway Tour	Swae Lee; Tyla Yaweh	28,967 / 28,967	$4,227,339
November 15	United States	Post Malone	Runaway Tour	Swae Lee; Tyla Yaweh	28,967 / 28,967	$4,227,339
November 19	South Korea	SuperM	SuperM: We Are the Future Live	—N/a		
December 3	United States	Cher	Here We Go Again Tour	Nile Rodgers; Chic	27,495 / 27,495	$3,842,660
December 4	United States	Cher	Here We Go Again Tour	Nile Rodgers; Chic	27,495 / 27,495	$3,842,660

== 2020s ==
2020

Entertainment events at Madison Square Garden
Date	Nationality	Artists	Tours	Supporting Acts	Attendance	Box Office
January 25	United States	Billy Joel	Billy Joel in Concert	—N/a	18,679/ 18,679	$2,564,160
February 13	United States	Marc Anthony	Opus Tour 2020	—N/a	—	—
February 14	United States	Eagles	Hotel California 2020 Tour	—N/a	41,058/ 41,058	$10,707,033
February 15	United States	Eagles	Hotel California 2020 Tour	—N/a	41,058/ 41,058	$10,707,033
February 19	United States	Eagles	Hotel California 2020 Tour	—N/a	41,058/ 41,058	$10,707,033
February 20	United States	Billy Joel	Billy Joel in Concert	—N/a	18,229/ 18,299	$2,418,296
February 28	United States	Hall & Oates	—N/a	—N/a	—	—
March 10	United States	The Brothers	—N/a	—N/a	—	—

2021

Entertainment events at Madison Square Garden
Date	Nationality	Artists	Tours	Supporting Acts	Attendance	Box Office
June 20	United States	Foo Fighters	Medicine at Midnight Tour	—N/a	—	—
September 16	United States	Dan+Shay	The (Arena) Tour	The Band Camino; Ingrid Andress	—	
October 3	United Kingdom	Harry Styles	Love On Tour	Jenny Lewis	56,392 / 56,392 (Note: The box office data is representative of the three shows at Madison Square Garden on 3-4 and 16 October respectively.)	$8,099,555
October 4	United Kingdom	Harry Styles	Love On Tour	Jenny Lewis	56,392 / 56,392	$8,099,555
October 8	United States	Chris Stapleton	Chris Stapleton's All-American Road Show Tour	The Marcus King Band; Yola		
October 16	United Kingdom	Harry Styles	Love On Tour	Jenny Lewis		
October 30	United Kingdom	Harry Styles	Love On Tour	Madison Cunningham; Orville Peck	37,321 / 37,321	$5,714,220
October 31	United Kingdom	Harry Styles	Love On Tour	Madison Cunningham; Orville Peck	37,321 / 37,321	$5,714,220
November 5	United States	Billy Joel	Billy Joel in Concert			
December 16	Italy	Andrea Bocelli				
December 17	Italy	Andrea Bocelli				
December 20	United States	Billy Joel	Billy Joel in Concert			

2022

Entertainment events at Madison Square Garden
Date	Nationality	Artists	Tours	Supporting Acts	Attendance	Box Office
February 5	United States	Kacey Musgraves	Star-crossed: unveiled	King Princess; MUNA	14,370 / 14,370	$1,703,117
February 12	United States	Billy Joel	Billy Joel in Concert	—N/a	—	—
February 18	United States	Billie Eilish	Happier Than Ever, The World Tour	Dora Jar	26,976 / 26,976	$3,927,430
February 19	United States	Billie Eilish	Happier Than Ever, The World Tour	Dora Jar	26,976 / 26,976	$3,927,430
February 22	United Kingdom	Elton John	Farewell Yellow Brick Road	—N/a	29,893 / 29,893	$6,860,968
February 23	United Kingdom	Elton John	Farewell Yellow Brick Road	—N/a	29,893 / 29,893	$6,860,968
March 1	United Kingdom	Dua Lipa	Future Nostalgia Tour	Caroline Polachek; Lolo Zouaï	15,461 / 15,461	$1,803,373
March 24	United States	Billy Joel	Billy Joel in Concert	—N/a	—	—
April 8	United States	Billy Joel	Billy Joel in Concert		—	—
May 14	United States	Billy Joel	Billy Joel in Concert		—	—
May 17	United States	Haim	One More Haim Tour	Princess Nokia; Faye Webster	—	—
June 10	United States	Billy Joel	Billy Joel in Concert	—	—	
June 30	United States	Big Time Rush	Forever Tour	Dixie D'Amelio	—	—
July 20	United States	Billy Joel	Billy Joel In Concert	—	—	
August 8	United States	Rage Against the Machine	Public Service Announcement Tour	Run The Jewels	68,659 / 68,659	$8,170,421
August 9	United States	Rage Against the Machine	Public Service Announcement Tour	Run The Jewels	68,659 / 68,659	$8,170,421
August 11	United States	Rage Against the Machine	Public Service Announcement Tour	Run The Jewels	68,659 / 68,659	$8,170,421
August 12	United States	Rage Against the Machine	Public Service Announcement Tour	Run The Jewels	68,659 / 68,659	$8,170,421
August 14	United States	Rage Against the Machine	Public Service Announcement Tour	Run The Jewels	68,659 / 68,659	$8,170,421
August 20	United Kingdom	Harry Styles	Love On Tour	Blood Orange	—	—
August 21	United Kingdom	Harry Styles	Love On Tour	Blood Orange	—	—
August 22	United Kingdom	Harry Styles	Love On Tour	Blood Orange	—	—
August 24	United States	Billy Joel	Billy Joel In Concert	—	—	
August 26	United Kingdom	Harry Styles	Love On Tour	Blood Orange	—	—
August 27	United Kingdom	Harry Styles	Love On Tour	Blood Orange	—	—
August 28	United Kingdom	Harry Styles	Love On Tour	Blood Orange	—	—
August 30	United Kingdom	Roger Waters	This Is Not a Drill	—N/a	29,314 / 34,082	$4,327,748
August 31	United Kingdom	Roger Waters	This Is Not a Drill	—N/a	29,314 / 34,082	$4,327,748
September 1	United Kingdom	Harry Styles	Love On Tour	Blood Orange	—	—
September 2	United Kingdom	Harry Styles	Love On Tour	Blood Orange	—	—
September 3	United Kingdom	Harry Styles	Love On Tour	Blood Orange	—	—
September 7	United Kingdom	Harry Styles	Love On Tour	Blood Orange	—	—
September 8	United Kingdom	Harry Styles	Love On Tour	Blood Orange	—	—
September 9	United States	Billy Joel	Billy Joel In Concert	—	—	
September 10	United Kingdom	Harry Styles	Love On Tour	Blood Orange	—	—
September 11	United States	Pearl Jam	Gigaton Tour	Pluralone	—	—
September 12	United Kingdom	Roxy Music	50th Anniversary Tour	St. Vincent	—	—
September 13	Colombia	Karol G	$trip Love Tour	—N/a	—	—
September 14	United Kingdom	Harry Styles	Love On Tour	Blood Orange	—	—
September 15	United Kingdom	Harry Styles	Love On Tour	Blood Orange	—	—
September 16	United Kingdom	Florence and the Machine	Dance Fever Tour	Sam Fender	—	—
September 17	United Kingdom	Florence and the Machine	Dance Fever Tour	Sam Fender	—	—
September 18	United Kingdom	Eric Clapton	—N/a	Jimmie Vaughan	—	—
September 19	United Kingdom	Eric Clapton	—N/a	Jimmie Vaughan	—	—
September 20	Puerto Rico	Daddy Yankee	La Última Vuelta World Tour	—N/a	12,487 / 12,487	$2,337,909
September 21	United Kingdom	Harry Styles	Love On Tour	Blood Orange	—	—
September 23	United States	Panic! at the Disco	Viva Las Vengeance Tour	Marina; Jake Wesley Rogers	—	—
September 27	United States	Ben Platt	Reverie Tour	Aly & AJ	—	—
September 28	United Kingdom	Pet Shop Boys; New Order	Unity Tour	—N/a	—	—
September 30	United States	The Killers	Imploding the Mirage Tour	Johnny Marr	26,206 / 26,206	$1,813,218
October 1	United States	The Killers	Imploding the Mirage Tour	Johnny Marr	26,206 / 26,206	$1,813,218
October 2	United States	Lizzo	The Special Tour	Latto	—	—
October 3	United States	Lizzo	The Special Tour	Latto	—	—
October 6	Norway	Kygo	—N/a	—N/a	—	—
October 8	Puerto Rico	Wisin & Yandel	La Última Misión World Tour	—N/a	—	—
October 9	United States	Billy Joel	Billy Joel In Concert	—N/a	—	—
October 12	United States	Post Malone	Twelve Carat Tour	Roddy Ricch	24,880 / 24,880	$3,286,899
October 13	United States	Post Malone	Twelve Carat Tour	Roddy Ricch	24,880 / 24,880	$3,286,899
October 19	United States	Smashing Pumpkins; Jane's Addiction	Spirits on Fire Tour	Poppy	—	—
October 22	United States	Brandi Carlile	Beyond These Silent Days Tour	Brittany Howard	—	—
November 7	United Kingdom	The 1975	At Their Very Best	Blackstarkids	12,947 / 12,947	$1,051,011
November 16	Nigeria	Wizkid	—N/a	—N/a	—	—
November 18	United States	Dave Matthews Band	Fall Tour 2022	—N/a	—	—
November 19	United States	Dave Matthews Band	Fall Tour 2022	—N/a	—	—
November 21	Belgium	Stromae	Multitude Tour	—N/a	—	—
November 22	Belgium	Stromae	Multitude Tour	—N/a	—	—
November 23	United States	Billy Joel	Billy Joel In Concert	—N/a	—	—
December 13	United States	Mariah Carey	Merry Christmas to All!	—N/a	—	—
December 14	Italy	Andrea Bocelli	Live in Concert	—N/a	—	—
December 16	United States	Mariah Carey	Merry Christmas to All!	—N/a	—	—
December 28	United States	Phish	—N/a	—N/a	—	—
December 29	United States	Phish	—N/a	—N/a	—	—
December 30	United States	Phish	—N/a	—N/a	—	—
December 31	United States	Phish	—N/a	—N/a	—	—

2023

Entertainment events at Madison Square Garden
Date	Nationality	Artists	Tours	Supporting Acts	Attendance	Box Office
January 13	United States	Billy Joel	Billy Joel in Concert	—N/a	—	—
January 28	United States	Louis C.K.	—N/a	—N/a	—	—
February 9	United States	Marc Anthony	Viviendo Tour	—N/a	—	—
February 14	United States	Billy Joel	Billy Joel In Concert	—N/a	17,944 / 17,944	$3,083,458
February 18	United Kingdom; United States	Four Tet, Fred again.., and Skrillex	—N/a	—N/a	—	—
February 21	United States	Carrie Underwood	Denim & Rhinestones Tour	Jimmie Allen	—	—
February 24	United States	Nas	—N/a		—	—
March 4	United States	SZA	SOS Tour	Omar Apollo	26,574 / 26,574	$4,738,096
March 5	United States	SZA	SOS Tour	Omar Apollo	26,574 / 26,574	$4,738,096
March 15	United States	John Mayer	Solo Tour	JP Saxe	—	—
March 17	United Kingdom	Muse	Will of the People World Tour	Evanescence; One Ok Rock	2,894	—
March 26	United States	Billy Joel	Billy Joel in Concert	—N/a	18,501 / 18,501	$3,218,836
April 1	United States	Bruce Springsteen	Springsteen and E Street Band 2023 Tour	—N/a	18,718 / 18,718	$4,404,597
April 14	United Kingdom	Depeche Mode	Memento Mori World Tour	Stella Rose	14,926 / 14,926	$3,302,047
April 15	United States	Reba McEntire	—N/a	Terri Clark; The Isaacs	—	—
April 25	United States	Billy Joel	Billy Joel in Concert	—N/a	—	—
May 5	United States	Billy Joel	Billy Joel in Concert	—N/a	—	—
May 6	Japan	Joji	Smithereens "OBLIVION" Tour	rei brown SavageRealm	—	—
May 8	United States	Janet Jackson	Janet Jackson: Together Again	Ludacris	24,500 / 24,500	$3,800,000
May 9	United States	Janet Jackson	Janet Jackson: Together Again	Ludacris	24,500 / 24,500	$3,800,000
May 19	United States	Blink-182	World Tour 2023/2024	Turnstile; Beauty School Dropout	—	—
May 28	Puerto Rico	Anuel AA	Legends Never Die Tour	—N/a	—	—
May 30	United States	Paramore	This Is Why Tour	Bloc Party; Genesis Owusu	—	—
May 31	United States	Paramore	This Is Why Tour	Bloc Party; Genesis Owusu	—	—
June 2	United States	Billy Joel	Billy Joel in Concert	—N/a	—	—
June 9	Canada	Bryan Adams	So Happy It Hurts Tour	Joan Jett	—	—
June 14	Ireland	Dermot Kennedy	The Sonder Tour	—N/a	—	—
June 17	Guatemala	Ricardo Arjona	Blanco Y Negro Volver Tour	—N/a	—	38,000
June 18	Guatemala	Ricardo Arjona	Blanco Y Negro Volver Tour	—N/a	—	38,000
June 20	United Kingdom	The Cure	Shows of a Lost World Tour	The Twilight Sad	—	—
June 21	United Kingdom	The Cure	Shows of a Lost World Tour	The Twilight Sad	—	—
June 22	United Kingdom	The Cure	Shows of a Lost World Tour	The Twilight Sad	—	—
June 23	United States	Avenged Sevenfold	Life Is but a Dream... Tour	Falling in Reverse; Living Colour	—	—
June 26	United Kingdom	Tears for Fears	The Tipping Point Part II Tour	Cold War Kids	—	—
July 8	United States	Erykah Badu	Unfollow Me Tour	Yasiin Bey	—	—
July 11	Canada	Shania Twain	Queen of Me Tour	Breland	13,686 / 13,686	$2,000,675
July 23	Canada; United States	Drake; 21 Savage	It's All a Blur Tour	—N/a	—	—
July 24	United States	Billy Joel	Billy Joel in Concert	—N/a	—	—
July 25	Canada; United States	Drake; 21 Savage	It's All a Blur Tour	—N/a	—	—
July 26	Canada; United States	Drake; 21 Savage	It's All a Blur Tour	—N/a	—	—
July 28	United States	Phish	Summer Tour 2023	—N/a	—	—
July 29	United States	Phish	Summer Tour 2023	—N/a	—	—
July 30	United States	Phish	Summer Tour 2023	—N/a	—	—
August 1	United States	Phish	Summer Tour 2023	—N/a	—	—
August 2	United States	Phish	Summer Tour 2023	—N/a	—	—
August 4	United States	Phish	Summer Tour 2023	—N/a	—	—
August 5	United States	Phish	Summer Tour 2023	—N/a	—	—
August 8	United Kingdom	Sam Smith	Gloria the Tour	Jessie Reyez	26,174 / 26,174	$2,164,843
August 9	United Kingdom	Sam Smith	Gloria the Tour	Jessie Reyez	26,174 / 26,174	$2,164,843
August 12	United States	Lionel Richie; Earth, Wind & Fire	Sing a Song All Night Long Tour	—N/a	—	—
August 18	United States	The National	First Two Pages of Frankenstein Tour	Patti Smith	—	—
August 21	Australia	5 Seconds of Summer	The 5 Seconds of Summer Show	—N/a	—	—
August 29	United States	Billy Joel	Billy Joel in Concert	—N/a	—	—
August 31	Mexico	RBD	Soy Rebelde Tour	—N/a	27,884 / 27,884	$8,588,037
September 1	Mexico	RBD	Soy Rebelde Tour	—N/a	27,884 / 27,884	$8,588,037
September 2	Mexico	Banda MS	—N/a		—	—
September 3	Israel	Ishay Ribo	—N/a		—	—
September 9	United States; France	Beck & Phoenix	Summer Odyssey Tour	Weyes Blood	—	—
September 10	United States	Billy Joel	Billy Joel in Concert	—N/a	—	—
September 12	United States	Greta Van Fleet	Starcatcher World Tour	Surf Curse	—	—
September 13	United States	Suicideboys	Grey Day Tour 2023	Ghostemane; City Morgue; Freddie Dredd; Sematary; Ramirez	—	—
September 15	United States	Wu-Tang Clan; Mary J. Blige; EPMD; Tyrese; Sean Paul; Mariah Carey; Maxwell	Hip Hop Forever	—N/a	—	—
September 18	United Kingdom	Peter Gabriel	i/o The Tour	—N/a	—	—
September 19	United States	The Postal Service & Death Cab for Cutie	Give Up & Translanticism	Warpaint	—	—
September 20	United States	The Postal Service & Death Cab for Cutie	Give Up & Translanticism	Warpaint	—	—
September 21	Italy	Måneskin	RUSH! World Tour	—N/a	—	—
September 29	United States	Tedeschi Trucks Band	The Garden Party	Lukas Nelson & Promise of the Real	—	—
September 30	Ireland	Hozier	Unreal Unearth Tour	Madison Cunningham	—	—
October 1	United States	Stevie Nicks	—N/a	TBA	—	—
October 2	United States	Boygenius	The Record Tour	MUNA	—	—
October 3	United States	John Mayer	Solo Tour	JP Saxe	—	—
October 4	United States	John Mayer	Solo Tour	JP Saxe	—	—
October 6	Colombia	Maluma	Don Juan Tour	—N/a	—	—
October 7	South Africa	Black Coffee	—N/a		—	—
October 8	Mexico	Luis Miguel	Luis Miguel Tour 2023	—N/a	12,424 / 12,424	$2,472,520
October 12	United Kingdom; United States	Queen + Adam Lambert	The Rhapsody Tour	—N/a	—	—
October 13	United Kingdom; United States	Queen + Adam Lambert	The Rhapsody Tour	—N/a	—	—
October 15	Puerto Rico	Anuel AA	Las Leyendas Nunca Mueren Tour	—	—	—
October 17	Canada; United States	Daniel Caesar; Omar Apollo	Superpowers World Tour	Montell Fish	—	—
October 20	United States	Billy Joel	Billy Joel in Concert	—N/a	—	—
October 21	Dominican Republic	El Alfa	La Leyenda del Dembow Tour	—N/a	—	—
October 26	Spain; United States; Puerto Rico	Enrique Iglesias; Pitbull; Ricky Martin	The Trilogy Tour	—N/a	—	—
October 27	Spain; United States; Puerto Rico	Enrique Iglesias; Pitbull; Ricky Martin	The Trilogy Tour	—N/a	—	—
October 28	United Kingdom	Depeche Mode	Memento Mori World Tour	DIIV	14,867 / 14,867	$2,571,362
November 4	United States	Pink	Trustfall Tour	Grouplove; KidCutUp	—	—
November 5	United States	Pink	Trustfall Tour	Grouplove; KidCutUp	—	—
November 14	United Kingdom	The 1975	Still... At Their Very Best	Dora Jar	—	—
November 15	United Kingdom	The 1975	Still... At Their Very Best	Dora Jar	—	—
November 17	United States	Dave Matthews Band	Fall Tour 2023	—N/a	—	—
November 18	United States	Dave Matthews Band	Fall Tour 2023	—N/a	—	—
November 22	United States	Billy Joel	Billy Joel in Concert	—N/a	—	—
December 1	United States	Kiss	End of the Road World Tour	—N/a	—	—
December 2	United States	Kiss	End of the Road World Tour	—N/a	—	—
December 13	Italy	Andrea Bocelli	Holiday Tour 2023	—N/a	—	—
December 14	Italy	Andrea Bocelli	Holiday Tour 2023	—N/a	—	—
December 17	United States	Mariah Carey	Merry Christmas One and All! Tour	—N/a	14,349 / 14,349	$2,266,090
December 19	United States	Billy Joel	Billy Joel in Concert	—N/a	—	—
December 21	United States	Travis Scott	Circus Maximus Tour	Teezo Touchdown	17,703 / 17,703	$3,533,062
December 28	United States	Phish	—N/a	—N/a	—	—
December 29	United States	Phish	—N/a	—N/a	—	—
December 30	United States	Phish	—N/a	—N/a	—	—
December 31	United States	Phish	—N/a	—N/a	—	—

2024

Entertainment events at Madison Square Garden
Date	Nationality	Artists	Tours	Supporting Acts	Attendance	Box Office
January 11	United States	Billy Joel	Billy Joel in Concert	—N/a	—	—
January 22	United States	Madonna	The Celebration Tour	Stuart Price	—	—
January 23	United States	Madonna	The Celebration Tour	Stuart Price	—	—
January 29	United States	Madonna	The Celebration Tour	Bearcat	—	—
February 9	United States	Billy Joel	Billy Joel in Concert	—N/a	—	—
March 22	United States	Fall Out Boy	So Much For (Tour) Dust	Jimmy Eat World; Hot Mulligan; Games We Play	—	—
March 28	United States	Billy Joel	Billy Joel in Concert	—N/a	—	—
March 30	Trinidad and Tobago	Nicki Minaj	Pink Friday 2 World Tour	Monica	13,702 / 13,702	$2,857,908
April 5	United States	Olivia Rodrigo	Guts World Tour	The Breeders	57,943 / 57,943	$7,754,249
April 6	United States	Olivia Rodrigo	Guts World Tour	The Breeders	57,943 / 57,943	$7,754,249
April 8	United States	Olivia Rodrigo	Guts World Tour	The Breeders	57,943 / 57,943	$7,754,249
April 9	United States	Olivia Rodrigo	Guts World Tour	The Breeders	57,943 / 57,943	$7,754,249
April 17	Nigeria	Davido	Timeless Tour	—N/a	—	—
April 26	United States	Billy Joel	Billy Joel in Concert	—N/a	—	—
May 9	United States	Billy Joel	Billy Joel in Concert	—N/a	—	—
May 21	United States	Megan Thee Stallion	Hot Girl Summer Tour	GloRilla	14,118 / 14,118	$1,724,250
May 22	United States	Aventura	Cerrando Ciclos	—N/a	—	—
May 23	United States	Aventura	Cerrando Ciclos	—N/a	—	—
June 1	South Korea	Tomorrow X Together	Act: Promise Tour	—N/a	—	—
June 2	South Korea	Tomorrow X Together	Act: Promise Tour	—N/a	—	—
June 5	United States	Melanie Martinez	The Trilogy Tour	Beach Bunny; Sofia Isella	—	—
June 6	United States	Melanie Martinez	The Trilogy Tour	Beach Bunny; Sofia Isella	—	—
June 8	United States	Billy Joel	Billy Joel in Concert	—N/a	—	—
June 13	Ireland	Niall Horan	The Show: Live on Tour	Del Water Gap	—	—
June 14	Ireland	Niall Horan	The Show: Live on Tour	Del Water Gap	—	—
June 25	United States	Justin Timberlake	The Forget Tomorrow World Tour	—N/a	—	—
June 26	United States	Justin Timberlake	The Forget Tomorrow World Tour	—N/a	—	—
July 24	United States	Xscape; SWV	Queens of R&B Tour	Mýa; 702; Total	—	—
July 25	United States	Billy Joel	Billy Joel in Concert	—N/a	—	—
July 26	United States	AJR	The Maybe Man Tour	mxmtoon Almost Monday	—	—
July 27	United States	AJR	The Maybe Man Tour	mxmtoon Almost Monday	—	—
August 12	United States	Slipknot	Slipknot 25th Anniversary Tour	Knocked Loose; Orbit Culture	—	—
August 22	Canada	Tate McRae	Think Later World Tour	Presley Regier	—	—
August 23	United States	Wallows	Model World Tour	Benee		
September 3	United States	Pearl Jam	Dark Matter World Tour	Glen Hansard	—	—
September 4	United States	Pearl Jam	Dark Matter World Tour	Glen Hansard	—	—
September 23	United Kingdom & Australia	Charli XCX Troye Sivan	Sweat	Shygirl		
September 25	United States	Meghan Trainor	The Timeless Tour	Natasha Bedingfield; Paul Russell	—	—
September 29	United States	Sabrina Carpenter	Short n' Sweet Tour	Amaarae	13,985 / 13,985	$1,935,205
September 30	United States	Conan Gray	Found Heaven On Tour	Maisie Peters	—	—
October 5	United States	Vampire Weekend	Only God Was Above Us Tour	Mark Ronson Turnstiles	—	—
October 6	United States	Vampire Weekend	Only God Was Above Us Tour	The Brothers Macklovitch Turnstiles		
October 16	United States	Billie Eilish	Hit Me Hard and Soft: The Tour	Nat & Alex Wolff	54,866 / 54,866	$9,498,638
October 17	United States	Billie Eilish	Hit Me Hard and Soft: The Tour	Nat & Alex Wolff	54,866 / 54,866	$9,498,638
October 18	United States	Billie Eilish	Hit Me Hard and Soft: The Tour	Nat & Alex Wolff	54,866 / 54,866	$9,498,638
October 30	United States	Cyndi Lauper	Girls Just Wanna Have Fun Farewell Tour	—N/a		
November 4	United Kingdom	David Gilmour	Luck and Strange Tour	—N/a	—	—
November 5	United Kingdom	David Gilmour	Luck and Strange Tour	—N/a	—	—
November 6	United Kingdom	David Gilmour	Luck and Strange Tour	—N/a	—	—
November 9	United Kingdom	David Gilmour	Luck and Strange Tour	—N/a	—	—
November 10	United Kingdom	David Gilmour	Luck and Strange Tour	—N/a	—	—

2025

Entertainment events at Madison Square Garden
Date	Nationality	Artists	Tours	Supporting Acts	Attendance	Box Office
January 24	United States	Dimension 20	Dimension 20 2025 Tour		20,000 - sold out	
March 21	United States	Disturbed	The Sickness 25th Anniversary Tour	Three Days Grace; Sevendust	—	—
March 27	United States	Nathaniel Rateliff & the Night Sweats	South of Here Tour		—	—
April 3	United States	Deftones	North America Tour 2025	The Mars Volta; Fleshwater	—	—
April 4	Australia	Kylie Minogue	Tension Tour	Romy	—	—
April 5	Australia	Kylie Minogue	Tension Tour	Romy	—	—
April 10	United States	Mary J. Blige	The For My Fans Tour	Ne-Yo; Mario	—	—
April 15	United States	The Allman Brothers		Chuck Leavell	—	—
April 16	United States	The Allman Brothers		Chuck Leavell	—	—
May 3	Nigeria	Rema	Heis World Tour		—	—
May 20	United States	Pierce the Veil	I Can't Hear You World Tour	Sleeping With Sirens; Daisy Grenade	—	—
May 24	Mexico	Los Tigres del Norte			—	—
May 30	Canada	Avril Lavigne	Greatest Hits Tour	Simple Plan; We the Kings	—	—
June 6	United States	Lil Wayne	Tha Carter VI Live		—	—
June 7	Nigeria	Wizkid	Morayo Live in New York		—	—
June 20	United States	Fuerza Regida	This Is Not A Tour		—	—
June 28	United States	Goose	The Everything Must Go tour		—	
July 12	United States	"Weird Al" Yankovic	Bigger & Weirder 2025 Tour		—	—
July 14	United States	Tyler, the Creator	Chromakopia: The World Tour	Lil Yachty; Paris Texas	—	—
July 15	United States	Tyler, the Creator	Chromakopia: The World Tour	Lil Yachty; Paris Texas	—	—
July 16	United States	Wu-Tang Clan	Wu-Tang Forever: The Final Chamber	Run the Jewels	—	—
July 20	United States	Shinedown	Dance, Kid, Dance Tour	Bush; Morgan Wade	—	—
July 22	Sweden	Ghost	World Tour 2025		—	—
July 23	United States	Kesha; Scissor Sisters	The Tits Out Tour	Vengaboys	—	—
July 24	United States	Keshi	Requiem Tour	Mac Ayres; Starfall	—	—
July 25	United States	Chris Stapleton	Chris Stapleton's All-American Road Show	Grace Potter	—	—
July 26	United States	Chris Stapleton	Chris Stapleton's All-American Road Show	Grace Potter	—	—
July 28	United States	Gracie Abrams	The Secret of Us Tour	Role Model	—	—
July 29	United States	Gracie Abrams	The Secret of Us Tour	Role Model	—	—
July 30	United States	Lord Huron		Waxahatchee	—	—
August 11	United States	Katy Perry	The Lifetimes Tour	Rebecca Black	—	—
August 17	India	Zakir Khan				
August 20	United States	Billy Idol	It's A Nice Day To...Tour Again!		—	—
August 22	United States	Lady Gaga	The Mayhem Ball		—	—
August 23	United States	Lady Gaga	The Mayhem Ball		—	—
August 26	United States	Lady Gaga	The Mayhem Ball		—	—
August 27	United States	Lady Gaga	The Mayhem Ball		—	—
August 28	United States	Dierks Bentley	Broken Branches Tour		—	—
August 30	United Kingdom	The Who	The Song Is Over – North American Farewell Tour		—	—
September 3	Canada	Tate McRae	Miss Possessive Tour	Zara Larsson	—	—
September 4	Canada	Tate McRae	Miss Possessive Tour	Zara Larsson	—	—
September 5	United States	Benson Boone	American Heart World Tour		—	—
September 6	United States	Lady Gaga	The Mayhem Ball			
September 7	United States	Lady Gaga	The Mayhem Ball			
September 8	United States	Haim	I quit tour 2025		—	—
September 11	United States	Kali Uchis	The Sincerely, Tour	Thee Sacred Souls	—	—
September 12	United States	Kali Uchis	The Sincerely, Tour	Thee Sacred Souls	—	—
September 13	United States	Vulfpeck			—	—
September 17	United Kingdom	Dua Lipa	Radical Optimism Tour		—	—
September 18	United Kingdom	Dua Lipa	Radical Optimism Tour		—	—
September 19	United Kingdom	Eric Clapton		The Wallflowers	—	—
September 20	United Kingdom	Dua Lipa	Radical Optimism Tour		—	—
September 21	United Kingdom	Dua Lipa	Radical Optimism Tour		—	—
September 19	United States	Hardy	Jim Bob World Tour	Koe Wetzel; Stephen Wilson Jr. Sikarus	—	—
September 29	United States	Reneé Rapp	Bite Me Tour	Syd	—	—
October 1	New Zealand	Lorde	Ultrasound World Tour	The Japanese House; Chanel Beads	—	—
October 10	United States	Lainey Wilson	Whirlwind Tour	Muscadine Bloodline; Lauren Watkins	—	—
October 15	Iceland	Laufey	A Matter of Time	Suki Waterhouse	—	—
October 16	Iceland	Laufey	A Matter of Time	Suki Waterhouse		
October 18	Canada	Tate McRae	Miss Possessive Tour	Alessi Rose	—	—
October 26	United States	Sabrina Carpenter	Short n' Sweet Tour	Olivia Dean; Amber Mark	—	—
October 28	United States	Sabrina Carpenter	Short n' Sweet Tour	Olivia Dean; Amber Mark	—	—
October 29	United States	Sabrina Carpenter	Short n' Sweet Tour	Olivia Dean; Amber Mark	—	—
October 30	Canada	Bryan Adams	Roll With The Punches	Pat Benatar; Neil Giraldo	—	—
October 31	United States	Sabrina Carpenter	Short n' Sweet Tour	Olivia Dean; Amber Mark	—	—
November 1	United States	Sabrina Carpenter	Short n' Sweet Tour	Olivia Dean; Amber Mark	—	—
November 6	United States	Giveon	Dear Beloved, the Tour	Charlotte Day Wilson		
November 19	United States	Maroon 5	Love Is Like Tour	Claire Rosinkranz	—	—
November 20	United States	Maroon 5	Love Is Like Tour	Claire Rosinkranz	—	—
November 22	United States	Gunna	Wun World Tour			
December 17	Italy	Andrea Bocelli	Andrea Bocelli In Concert		—	—
December 18	Italy	Andrea Bocelli	Andrea Bocelli In Concert		—	—
December 28	United States	Phish	New Year's Run 2025		—	—
December 29	United States	Phish	New Year's Run 2025		—	—
December 30	United States	Phish	New Year's Run 2025		—	—
December 31	United States	Phish	New Year's Run 2025		—	—

2026

Entertainment events at Madison Square Garden
Date	Nationality	Artists	Tours	Supporting Acts	Attendance	Box Office
February 11	Guatemala	Ricardo Arjona	Lo Que el Seco No Dijo Tour		—	—
February 12	Guatemala	Ricardo Arjona	Lo Que el Seco No Dijo Tour		—	—
February 13	United States	Brandi Carlile	The Human Tour	The Head and the Heart	—	—
February 14	United States	Brandi Carlile	The Human Tour	The Head and the Heart	—	—
March 19	United States	Lady Gaga	The Mayhem Ball		—	—
March 20	United States	Lady Gaga	The Mayhem Ball		—	—
March 21	United Kingdom	FKA Twigs	Body High Tour	Tokischa	—	—
March 25	United States	Cardi B	Little Miss Drama Tour		—	—
March 26	United States	Cardi B	Little Miss Drama Tour		—	—
April 13	United States	Lady Gaga	The Mayhem Ball		—	—
April 14	United States	The Neighbourhood	Wourld Tour	Noise Dept	—	—
April 16	United Kingdom	Lewis Capaldi	2026 Tour	Joy Crookes	—	—
April 21	United Kingdom	Florence and the Machine	Everybody Scream Tour	Sofia Isella	—	—
April 22	United Kingdom	Florence and the Machine	Everybody Scream Tour	Sofia Isella	—	—
April 24	United States	Demi Lovato	It's Not That Deep Tour	Adéla	—	—
April 30	Mexico	Peso Pluma	Dinastía Tour		—	—
May 2	United Kingdom	Bring Me the Horizon	N. American Ascension Program 2	Motionless in White	—	—
May 11	United States	Bruce Springsteen	Land of Hope & Dreams American Tour		—	—
May 16	United States	Bruce Springsteen	Land of Hope & Dreams American Tour		—	—
May 24	India	Diljit Dosanjh	Aura Tour		—	—
May 25	India	Diljit Dosanjh	Aura Tour		—	—
May 29	United States	Charlie Puth	Whatever's Clever! World Tour	Daniel Seavey	—	—
May 30	United States	Kid Cudi	The Rebel Ragers	Big Boi	—	—
June 4	United States	Stephen Sanchez	Angel Face Tour		—	—
June 11	United States	Forrest Frank	The Jesus Generation Tour	Tori Kelly Cory Asbury The Figs		
June 12	United States	Jennifer Hudson		Josh Groban	—	—
June 13	Australia	5 Seconds of Summer	Everyone's a Star! World Tour	The Band Camino	—	—
June 16	Spain	Rosalía	Lux Tour		—	—
June 17	Spain	Rosalía	Lux Tour		—	—
June 19	United States	Goose	Summer Tour 2026		—	—
June 20	United States	Goose	Summer Tour 2026		—	—
June 22	Mexico	Carín León	De Sonora Para El Mundo		—	—
June 23	United States	Bleachers	Bleachers Forever		—	—
June 25	Australia	Rüfüs du Sol	North American 2026 Tour		—	—
June 26	Australia	Rüfüs du Sol	North American 2026 Tour		—	—
June 27	Australia	Rüfüs du Sol	North American 2026 Tour		—	—
June 28	Australia	Rüfüs du Sol	North American 2026 Tour		—	—
July 7	United States	Bon Jovi	Forever Tour		—	—
July 8	United Kingdom	Louis Tomlinson	How Did We Get Here? World Tour		—	—
July 9	United States	Bon Jovi	Forever Tour		—	—
July 11	United States	Lionel Richie	Sing a Song All Night Long	Earth, Wind and Fire	—	—
July 12	United States	Bon Jovi	Forever Tour		—	—
July 13	United States	Madison Beer	The Locket Tour	Lulu Simon Thủy	—	—
July 14	United States	Bon Jovi	Forever Tour		—	—
July 15	United States	Alex Warren	Finding Family on the Road	Noah Cyrus	—	—
July 16	United States	Bon Jovi	Forever Tour		—	—
July 19	United States	Bon Jovi	Forever Tour		—	—
July 20	United States	The Pussycat Dolls	PCD Forever Tour		—	—
July 21	United States	Bon Jovi	Forever Tour		—	—
July 22	United States	Phish	Summer Tour 2026		—	—
July 23	United States	Bon Jovi	Forever Tour		—	—
July 24	United States	Phish	Summer Tour 2026		—	—
July 25	United States	Phish	Summer Tour 2026		—	—
July 26	United States	Bon Jovi	Forever Tour		—	—
July 27	United States	Phish	Summer Tour 2026		—	—
July 28	Canada	Rush	Fifty Something Tour		—	—
July 29	United States	Phish	Summer Tour 2026		—	—
July 30	Canada	Rush	Fifty Something Tour		—	—
August 1	Canada	Rush	Fifty Something Tour		—	—
August 3	Canada	Rush	Fifty Something Tour		—	—
August 4	United States	J. Cole	The Fall-Off Tour		—	—
August 5	United States	Hilary Duff	The Lucky Me Tour		—	—
August 6	United States	Hilary Duff	The Lucky Me Tour		—	—
August 11	United Kingdom	Mumford & Sons	Prizefighter Tour	Medium Build	—	—
August 12	United Kingdom	Mumford & Sons	Prizefighter Tour	Medium Build	—	—
August 13	United Kingdom	Mumford & Sons	Prizefighter Tour	Medium Build	—	—
August 14	United Kingdom	Olivia Dean	The Art of Loving Live		—	—
August 15	United Kingdom	Olivia Dean	The Art of Loving Live		—	—
August 17	United Kingdom	Olivia Dean	The Art of Loving Live		—	—
August 18	United Kingdom	Olivia Dean	The Art of Loving Live		—	—
August 26	United Kingdom	Harry Styles	Together, Together	Jamie xx	—	—
August 28	United Kingdom	Harry Styles	Together, Together	Jamie xx	—	—
August 29	United Kingdom	Harry Styles	Together, Together	Jamie xx	—	—
August 31	United States	Kacey Musgraves	Middle of Nowhere Tour		—	—
September 1	United States	Kacey Musgraves	Middle of Nowhere Tour		—	—
September 2	United Kingdom	Harry Styles	Together, Together		—	—
September 3	United Kingdom	Lily Allen	West End Girl		—	—
September 4	United Kingdom	Harry Styles	Together, Together	Jamie xx	—	—
September 5	United Kingdom	Harry Styles	Together, Together	Jamie xx	—	—
September 9	United Kingdom	Harry Styles	Together, Together	Jamie xx	—	—
September 11	United Kingdom	Harry Styles	Together, Together	Jamie xx	—	—
September 12	United Kingdom	Harry Styles	Together, Together	Jamie xx	—	—
September 16	United Kingdom	Harry Styles	Together, Together	Jamie xx	—	—
September 17	United States	Mt. Joy	World Tour 2026		—	—
September 18	United Kingdom	Harry Styles	Together, Together	Jamie xx	—	—
September 19	United Kingdom	Harry Styles	Together, Together	Jamie xx	—	—
September 23	United Kingdom	Harry Styles	Together, Together	Jamie xx	—	—
September 25	United Kingdom	Harry Styles	Together, Together	Jamie xx	—	—
September 26	United Kingdom	Harry Styles	Together, Together	Jamie xx	—	—
September 29	United Kingdom	Gorillaz	The Mountain Tour	Little Simz	—	—
September 30	United Kingdom	Harry Styles	Together, Together	Jamie xx	—	—
October 2	United Kingdom	Harry Styles	Together, Together	Jamie xx	—	—
October 3	United Kingdom	Harry Styles	Together, Together	Jamie xx	—	—
October 7	United Kingdom	Harry Styles	Together, Together	Jamie xx	—	—
October 9	United Kingdom	Harry Styles	Together, Together	Jamie xx	—	—
October 10	United Kingdom	Harry Styles	Together, Together	Jamie xx	—	—
October 14	United Kingdom	Harry Styles	Together, Together	Jamie xx	—	—
October 16	United Kingdom	Harry Styles	Together, Together	Jamie xx	—	—
October 17	United Kingdom	Harry Styles	Together, Together	Jamie xx	—	—
October 21	United Kingdom	Harry Styles	Together, Together	Jamie xx	—	—
October 23	United Kingdom	Harry Styles	Together, Together	Jamie xx	—	—
October 24	United Kingdom	Harry Styles	Together, Together	Jamie xx	—	—
October 28	United Kingdom	Harry Styles	Together, Together	Jamie xx	—	—
October 30	United Kingdom	Harry Styles	Together, Together	Jamie xx	—	—
October 31	United Kingdom	Harry Styles	Together, Together	Jamie xx	—	—
November 23	United States	Sombr	You Are the Reason Tour	Dove Cameron	—	—
December 1	United States	Doja Cat	Tour Ma Vie World Tour		—	—
