= News of the World Tour =

1977–1978 concert tour by Queen

- World tour by Queen
- Poster to the concert in Dortmund
- Location: Europe; North America
- Associated album: News of the World
- Start date: 11 November 1977
- End date: 13 May 1978
- Legs: 2
- No. of shows: 26 in North America; 20 in Europe; 46 in total

Queen concert chronology
- A Day at the Races Tour (1977); News of the World Tour (1977–1978); Jazz Tour (1978–1979)

The News of the World Tour was the fifth headlining concert tour by the British rock band Queen, supporting their successful 1977 album News of the World. The tour spanned from 11 November 1977 to 13 May 1978 over three tour legs: North America, Europe, and the United Kingdom. Rehearsals for the tour took place at Shepperton Studios in October 1977.

== Overview ==
Hot off the heels of the A Day at the Races Tour, the band retreated to Wessex Studios to record their sixth studio album, News of the World. A video shoot for the first single off the album, "We Are the Champions", was shot on 6 October 1977 at New London Theatre. Many people from the Queen Fan Club were privately invited to the event to fill up the theatre. After running through four takes of the video, the band played a short live set for the 900 person audience, which served as a warm-up gig for the tour in the coming month. The band then spent the last week of the month rehearsing for the tour, during which, News of the World was released (28 October 1977).

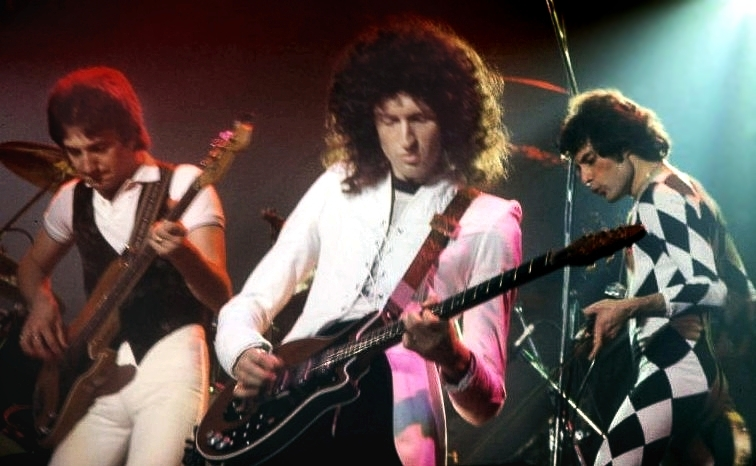
Deacon, May, and Mercury (L-R) on stage during the North American leg of the News of the World Tour at New Haven Coliseum on 16 November 1977.

Visually, their show has been revamped for this tour. The News of the World Tour prominently features their brand new lighting rig, "The Crown." The rig was first used for their two shows at Earls Court in June 1977. The full rig cost £50,000 to make, was 25 feet tall by 54 feet wide, and was the world's first mobile lighting rig. The Crown was scaled down for this tour, and built in Boston. The stage outfits have also changed. Instead of starting the show in his white jumpsuit like on the previous tour, Mercury would start the show with a leather jacket on top of his iconic leotards. There also seems to be a larger assortment of leotards in Mercury's arsenal for this tour, such as the black and white checkered outfit (worn on most shows, including the filmed concert in Houston), the black and white striped outfit (featured in Boston, Oakland, and Stockholm), the orange, green, and white checkered outfit (featured in the second night in Philadelphia and the second night in Rotterdam), the full white outfit (featured in the first night in Rotterdam), and the full black outfit (featured in Copenhagen and Hamburg). During the second encore, Mercury would switch to another spandex leotard coated in sparkles. However, for the UK Leg of the tour in 1978, Mercury had ditched the leotards for the main set, and instead wore leather pants and suspenders. This would become his main outfit for the following tour at the end of the year. His outfit for the second encore also changed on the UK leg; Mercury wears a sparkled spandex leotard similar to the one on the previous legs, but it's red instead of white, and the legs have been cut off. As for the other members, Brian May would typically wear a white jacket with black slacks and Nike Cortez sneakers through the main set, and would come out during the rock section of "Bohemian Rhapsody" in poncho-like drapes designed by Zandra Rhodes then for the encores a white shirt with black vest. Roger Taylor would dress in a white, baggy shirt (would switch shirts during "Love of My Life" to a black shirt and wore white pants (first half of show) and black pants (for second half) and sneakers, and John Deacon would casually dress in a shirt, slacks and shoes.

It was the first to feature "We Will Rock You", "We Are the Champions" and "Love of My Life" – three of the anthems that helped make Queen well known for their concerts.

This tour was the first the band performed without an opening act although at some shows on the US leg Cheap Trick served as opening act (namely Portland, Chicago and one of the shows in Los Angeles)

The News of the World Tour is also notable for featuring some of Queen's longest shows, generally lasting two hours per night, in contrast to previous tours, where the shows would last around 1 hour and 40 minutes. The shows in Boston (12 November 1977) and Inglewood (22 December 1977) were particularly lengthy performances, with the concert in Boston clocking in at 2 hours and 25 minutes, and the concert in Inglewood clocking in at 2 hours and 15 minutes, making them the second and third longest shows of Queen's career, respectively.

One of the shows on the North American leg – at The Summit in Houston, Texas – was filmed and is widely available among fans. The Houston concert is considered one of their best bootlegs. Other shows on the tour were filmed by Bob Harris and his crew, those being Atlanta (8 December 1977), Fort Worth (10 December 1977), and Las Vegas (15 December 1977), though no footage from those three performances have been seen. Footage of the pre-show setup from was mis-labeled in some documentaries as being at The Omni in Atlanta, but was in fact at the Summit in Houston.

== Setlists ==
Out of the eleven songs on News of the World, eight would be featured on stage in some capacity, whether it be the full song, or as part of the typical medley that they would perform early in the set. Songs that were performed in full include: "We Are the Champions," "Spread Your Wings," "Sleeping on the Sidewalk," "It's Late," and "My Melancholy Blues." "We Will Rock You" was performed three times during the set: First, it opened the show on playback while Freddie Mercury would walk out on stage and sing the first verse of the song, after which Brian May would finish the song with his guitar solo. The band would then quickly follow up with the fast version of the song, which was notably featured on Live Killers. The third and final performance of the song would be during the encores. This time, the playback would not be present, and instead, Roger Taylor would provide a real drum beat. Only one verse of the song is played again, but the song would be featured in full by the next tour. "Sheer Heart Attack" cut down to only a single verse, but just like "We Will Rock You," the song would eventually be played in full by the following tour. Finally, "Get Down Make Love" would be featured as part of the medley, and thus, the second verse and chorus were cut from the song.

"Sleeping on the Sidewalk" would not last long on stage, as the band only played the song at three shows on the tour before dropping it from the set. A live version of the song was released in the 40th Anniversary Box Set of News of the World, but the exact concert it was recorded at is unknown.

=== Average setlist ===
This setlist is representative of the performance on 1 December 1977 in New York City, United States. It does not represent all the setlists for the duration of the tour.

1. "We Will Rock You (Slow)"
2. "We Will Rock You (Fast)"
3. "Brighton Rock"
4. "Somebody To Love"
5. "It's Late"
6. "Death on Two Legs"
7. "Killer Queen"
8. "Good Old-Fashioned Lover Boy"
9. "I'm in Love with My Car"
10. "Get Down, Make Love"
11. "The Millionaire Waltz"
12. "You're My Best Friend"
13. "Spread Your Wings"
14. "Liar"
15. "Love of My Life"
16. "'39"
17. "My Melancholy Blues"
18. "White Man"
19. "The Prophet's Song"
20. "Guitar Solo"
21. "The Prophet's Song (Reprise)"
22. "Now I'm Here"
23. "Stone Cold Crazy"
24. "Bohemian Rhapsody"
25. "Keep Yourself Alive"
26. "Tie Your Mother Down"
  Encore
27. "We Will Rock You"
28. "We Are The Champions"
  Encore
29. "Sheer Heart Attack"
30. "Jailhouse Rock"
31. "God Save The Queen"

=== Selected setlists ===
North America

Detroit, United States / Toronto, Canada

1. "We Will Rock You"
2. "We Will Rock You (Fast)"
3. "Brighton Rock"
4. "Somebody To Love"
5. "It's Late"
6. "Death on Two Legs"
7. "Killer Queen"
8. "Good Old-Fashioned Lover Boy"
9. "I'm in Love with My Car"
10. "Get Down, Make Love"
11. "The Millionaire Waltz"
12. "You're My Best Friend"
13. "Spread Your Wings"
14. "Liar"
15. "Love of My Life"
16. "'39"
17. "My Melancholy Blues"
18. "White Man"
19. "The Prophet's Song"
20. "Guitar Solo"
21. "The Prophet's Song (Reprise)"
22. "Keep Yourself Alive"
23. "Stone Cold Crazy"
24. "Now I'm Here"
25. "Bohemian Rhapsody"
26. "Tie Your Mother Down"
  Encore
27. "We Will Rock You"
28. "We Are The Champions"
  Encore
29. "Sheer Heart Attack"
30. "Jailhouse Rock"
31. "God Save The Queen"

Philadelphia, United States

1. "We Will Rock You"
2. "We Will Rock You (Fast)"
3. "Brighton Rock"
4. "Somebody To Love"
5. "It's Late"
6. "Death on Two Legs"
7. "Killer Queen"
8. "Good Old-Fashioned Lover Boy"
9. "I'm in Love with My Car"
10. "Get Down, Make Love"
11. "The Millionaire Waltz"
12. "You're My Best Friend"
13. "Ogre Battle"
14. "Spread Your Wings"
15. "Liar"
16. "Love of My Life"
17. "'39"
18. "My Melancholy Blues"
19. "White Man"
20. "The Prophet's Song"
21. "Guitar Solo"
22. "The Prophet's Song (Reprise)"
23. "Keep Yourself Alive"
24. "Stone Cold Crazy"
25. "Bohemian Rhapsody"
26. "Now I'm Here"
27. "Tie Your Mother Down"
  Encore
28. "We Will Rock You"
29. "We Are The Champions"
  Encore
30. "Sheer Heart Attack"
31. "Jailhouse Rock"
32. "God Save The Queen"

New York City, United States (First Night)

1. "We Will Rock You"
2. "We Will Rock You (Fast)"
3. "Brighton Rock"
4. "Somebody To Love"
5. "It's Late"
6. "Death on Two Legs"
7. "Killer Queen"
8. "Good Old-Fashioned Lover Boy"
9. "I'm in Love with My Car"
10. "Get Down, Make Love"
11. "The Millionaire Waltz"
12. "You're My Best Friend"
13. "Spread Your Wings"
14. "Liar"
15. "Love of My Life"
16. "'39"
17. "My Melancholy Blues"
18. "White Man"
19. "The Prophet's Song"
20. "Guitar Solo"
21. "The Prophet's Song (Reprise)"
22. "Now I'm Here"
23. "Stone Cold Crazy"
24. "Bohemian Rhapsody"
25. "Keep Yourself Alive"
26. "Tie Your Mother Down"
  Encore
27. "We Will Rock You"
28. "We Are The Champions"
  Encore
29. "Sheer Heart Attack"
30. "Jailhouse Rock"
31. "God Save The Queen"

New York City, United States (Second Night)

1. "We Will Rock You"
2. "We Will Rock You (Fast)"
3. "Brighton Rock"
4. "Somebody To Love"
5. "Death on Two Legs"
6. "Killer Queen"
7. "Good Old-Fashioned Lover Boy"
8. "I'm in Love with My Car"
9. "Get Down, Make Love"
10. "The Millionaire Waltz"
11. "You're My Best Friend"
12. "Doing All Right"
13. "Liar"
14. "Love of My Life"
15. "'39"
16. "White Man"
17. "The Prophet's Song"
18. "Guitar Solo"
19. "The Prophet's Song (Reprise)"
20. "Now I'm Here"
21. "Stone Cold Crazy"
22. "Bohemian Rhapsody"
23. "Keep Yourself Alive"
24. "Tie Your Mother Down"
  Encore
25. "We Will Rock You"
26. "We Are The Champions"
  Encore
27. "Sheer Heart Attack"
28. "Jailhouse Rock"
29. "Saturday Night's Alright For Fighting"
30. "God Save The Queen"

Chicago, United States

1. "We Will Rock You"
2. "We Will Rock You (Fast)"
3. "Brighton Rock"
4. "Somebody To Love"
5. "Death on Two Legs"
6. "Killer Queen"
7. "Good Old-Fashioned Lover Boy"
8. "I'm in Love with My Car"
9. "Get Down, Make Love"
10. "The Millionaire Waltz"
11. "You're My Best Friend"
12. "Spread Your Wings"
13. "Liar"
14. "Love of My Life"
15. "'39"
16. "My Melancholy Blues"
17. "White Man"
18. "The Prophet's Song"
19. "Guitar Solo"
20. "The Prophet's Song (Reprise)"
21. "Now I'm Here"
22. "Stone Cold Crazy"
23. "Bohemian Rhapsody"
24. "Keep Yourself Alive"
25. "Tie Your Mother Down"
  Encore
26. "We Will Rock You"
27. "We Are The Champions"
  Encore
28. "Sheer Heart Attack"
29. "Jailhouse Rock"
30. "God Save The Queen"

Houston, United States

1. "We Will Rock You"
2. "We Will Rock You (Fast)"
3. "Brighton Rock"
4. "Somebody To Love"
5. "Death on Two Legs"
6. "Killer Queen"
7. "Good Old-Fashioned Lover Boy"
8. "I'm in Love with My Car"
9. "Get Down, Make Love"
10. "The Millionaire Waltz"
11. "You're My Best Friend"
12. "Liar"
13. "Love of My Life"
14. "'39"
15. "My Melancholy Blues"
16. "White Man"
17. "The Prophet's Song"
18. "Guitar Solo"
19. "Now I'm Here"
20. "Stone Cold Crazy"
21. "Bohemian Rhapsody"
22. "Keep Yourself Alive"
23. "Tie Your Mother Down"
  Encore
24. "We Will Rock You"
25. "We Are The Champions"
  Encore
26. "Sheer Heart Attack"
27. "Jailhouse Rock"
28. "God Save The Queen"

Long Beach, United States

1. "We Will Rock You"
2. "We Will Rock You (Fast)"
3. "Brighton Rock"
4. "Somebody To Love"
5. "Death on Two Legs"
6. "Killer Queen"
7. "Good Old-Fashioned Lover Boy"
8. "I'm in Love with My Car"
9. "Get Down, Make Love"
10. "The Millionaire Waltz"
11. "You're My Best Friend"
12. "Liar"
13. "Love of My Life"
14. "'39"
15. "My Melancholy Blues"
16. "White Man"
17. "The Prophet's Song"
18. "Guitar Solo"
19. "The Prophet's Song (Reprise)"
20. "Now I'm Here"
21. "Stone Cold Crazy"
22. "Bohemian Rhapsody"
23. "Keep Yourself Alive"
24. "Tie Your Mother Down"
  Encore
25. "We Will Rock You"
26. "We Are The Champions"
  Encore
27. "Sheer Heart Attack"
28. "Jailhouse Rock"
29. "God Save The Queen"

Inglewood, United States

1. "We Will Rock You"
2. "We Will Rock You (Fast)"
3. "Brighton Rock"
4. "Somebody To Love"
5. "It's Late"
6. "Death on Two Legs"
7. "Killer Queen"
8. "Good Old-Fashioned Lover Boy"
9. "I'm in Love with My Car"
10. "Get Down, Make Love"
11. "The Millionaire Waltz"
12. "You're My Best Friend"
13. "Spread Your Wings"
14. "Liar"
15. "Love of My Life"
16. "White Christmas"
17. "'39"
18. "My Melancholy Blues"
19. "White Man"
20. "The Prophet's Song"
21. "Guitar Solo"
22. "The Prophet's Song (Reprise)"
23. "Now I'm Here"
24. "Stone Cold Crazy"
25. "Bohemian Rhapsody"
26. "Keep Yourself Alive"
27. "Tie Your Mother Down"
  Encore
28. "We Will Rock You"
29. "We Are The Champions"
  Encore
30. "Sheer Heart Attack"
31. "Jailhouse Rock"
32. "God Save The Queen"

Europe

Stockholm, Sweden / Copenhagen, Denmark / Rotterdam, Netherlands (First Night) / Paris, France / Dortmund, Germany / Zurich, Switzerland / Vienna, Austria

1. "We Will Rock You"
2. "We Will Rock You (Fast)"
3. "Brighton Rock"
4. "Somebody To Love"
5. "Death on Two Legs"
6. "Killer Queen"
7. "Good Old-Fashioned Lover Boy"
8. "I'm in Love with My Car"
9. "Get Down, Make Love"
10. "The Millionaire Waltz"
11. "You're My Best Friend"
12. "Spread Your Wings"
13. "It's Late"
14. "Now I'm Here"
15. "Love of My Life"
16. "'39"
17. "My Melancholy Blues"
18. "White Man"
19. "The Prophet's Song"
20. "Guitar Solo"
21. "The Prophet's Song (Reprise)"
22. "Stone Cold Crazy"
23. "Bohemian Rhapsody"
24. "Keep Yourself Alive"
25. "Tie Your Mother Down"
  Encore
26. "We Will Rock You"
27. "We Are The Champions"
  Encore
28. "Sheer Heart Attack"
29. "Jailhouse Rock"
30. "God Save The Queen"

Rotterdam, Netherlands (Second Night)

1. "We Will Rock You"
2. "We Will Rock You (Fast)"
3. "Brighton Rock"
4. "Somebody To Love"
5. "Death on Two Legs"
6. "Killer Queen"
7. "Good Old-Fashioned Lover Boy"
8. "I'm in Love with My Car"
9. "Get Down, Make Love"
10. "The Millionaire Waltz"
11. "You're My Best Friend"
12. "Spread Your Wings"
13. "Liar"
14. "Now I'm Here"
15. "Love of My Life"
16. "'39"
17. "My Melancholy Blues"
18. "White Man"
19. "The Prophet's Song"
20. "Guitar Solo"
21. "The Prophet's Song (Reprise)"
22. "Stone Cold Crazy"
23. "Bohemian Rhapsody"
24. "Keep Yourself Alive"
25. "Tie Your Mother Down"
  Encore
26. "We Will Rock You"
27. "We Are The Champions"
  Encore
28. "Sheer Heart Attack"
29. "Jailhouse Rock"
30. "God Save The Queen"

Berlin, Germany

1. "We Will Rock You"
2. "We Will Rock You (Fast)"
3. "Brighton Rock"
4. "Somebody To Love"
5. "Death on Two Legs"
6. "Killer Queen"
7. "Good Old-Fashioned Lover Boy"
8. "I'm in Love with My Car"
9. "Get Down, Make Love"
10. "The Millionaire Waltz"
11. "You're My Best Friend"
12. "Spread Your Wings"
13. "It's Late"
14. "Now I'm Here"
15. "Love of My Life"
16. "'39"
17. "My Melancholy Blues"
18. "White Man"
19. "The Prophet's Song"
20. "Guitar Solo"
21. "The Prophet's Song (Reprise)"
22. "Stone Cold Crazy"
23. "Bohemian Rhapsody"
24. "Keep Yourself Alive"
25. "Tie Your Mother Down"
  Encore
26. "We Will Rock You"
27. "We Are The Champions"
  Encore
28. "Big Spender"
29. "Sheer Heart Attack"
30. "Jailhouse Rock"
31. "God Save The Queen"

Stafford, England / London, England (First Night) / London, England (Second Night)

1. "We Will Rock You"
2. "We Will Rock You (Fast)"
3. "Brighton Rock"
4. "Somebody To Love"
5. "Death on Two Legs"
6. "Killer Queen"
7. "Good Old-Fashioned Lover Boy"
8. "I'm in Love with My Car"
9. "Get Down, Make Love"
10. "The Millionaire Waltz"
11. "You're My Best Friend"
12. "Spread Your Wings"
13. "It's Late"
14. "Now I'm Here"
15. "Love of My Life"
16. "'39"
17. "My Melancholy Blues"
18. "White Man"
19. "The Prophet's Song"
20. "Guitar Solo"
21. "The Prophet's Song (Reprise)"
22. "Liar"
23. "Bohemian Rhapsody"
24. "Keep Yourself Alive"
25. "Tie Your Mother Down"
  Encore
26. "We Will Rock You"
27. "We Are The Champions"
  Encore
28. "Sheer Heart Attack"
29. "Jailhouse Rock"
30. "God Save The Queen"

London, England (Third Night)

1. "We Will Rock You"
2. "We Will Rock You (Fast)"
3. "Brighton Rock"
4. "Somebody To Love"
5. "White Queen"
6. "Death on Two Legs"
7. "Killer Queen"
8. "Good Old-Fashioned Lover Boy"
9. "I'm in Love with My Car"
10. "Get Down, Make Love"
11. "The Millionaire Waltz"
12. "You're My Best Friend"
13. "Spread Your Wings"
14. "It's Late"
15. "Now I'm Here"
16. "Love of My Life"
17. "'39"
18. "My Melancholy Blues"
19. "White Man"
20. "The Prophet's Song"
21. "Guitar Solo"
22. "The Prophet's Song (Reprise)"
23. "Liar"
24. "Bohemian Rhapsody"
25. "Keep Yourself Alive"
26. "Tie Your Mother Down"
  Encore
27. "Sheer Heart Attack"
28. "Jailhouse Rock"
  Encore
29. "We Will Rock You"
30. "We Are The Champions"
31. "God Save The Queen"

== Tour dates ==
List of 1977 concerts
Date	City	Country	Venue
11 November 1977	Portland	United States	Cumberland County Civic Center
12 November 1977	Boston	United States	Boston Garden
13 November 1977	Springfield	United States	Springfield Civic Center
15 November 1977	Providence	United States	Providence Civic Center
16 November 1977	New Haven	United States	New Haven Coliseum
18 November 1977	Detroit	United States	Cobo Arena
19 November 1977	Detroit	United States	Cobo Arena
21 November 1977	Toronto	Canada	Maple Leaf Gardens
23 November 1977	Philadelphia	United States	The Spectrum
24 November 1977	Philadelphia	United States	The Spectrum
25 November 1977	Norfolk	United States	Norfolk Scope
27 November 1977	Richfield	United States	Richfield Coliseum
29 November 1977	Landover	United States	Capital Centre
1 December 1977	New York City	United States	Madison Square Garden
2 December 1977	New York City	United States	Madison Square Garden
4 December 1977	Dayton	United States	University of Dayton Arena
5 December 1977	Chicago	United States	Chicago Stadium
8 December 1977	Atlanta	United States	Omni Coliseum
10 December 1977	Fort Worth	United States	Tarrant County Convention Center
11 December 1977	Houston	United States	The Summit
15 December 1977	Las Vegas	United States	Aladdin Theatre for the Performing Arts
16 December 1977	San Diego	United States	San Diego Sports Arena
17 December 1977	Oakland	United States	Oakland–Alameda County Coliseum Arena
20 December 1977	Long Beach	United States	Long Beach Convention Center
21 December 1977	Long Beach	United States	Long Beach Convention Center
22 December 1977	Inglewood	United States	The Forum

List of 1978 concerts
Date	City	Country	Venue
12 April 1978	Stockholm	Sweden	Johanneshovs Isstadion
13 April 1978	Copenhagen	Denmark	Falkoner Center
14 April 1978	Hamburg	West Germany	Ernst-Merck-Halle
16 April 1978	Brussels	Belgium	Forest National
17 April 1978	Brussels	Belgium	Forest National
19 April 1978	Rotterdam	Netherlands	Rotterdam Ahoy
20 April 1978	Rotterdam	Netherlands	Rotterdam Ahoy
21 April 1978	Brussels	Belgium	Forest National
23 April 1978	Paris	France	Pavillon de Paris
24 April 1978	Paris	France	Pavillon de Paris
26 April 1978	Dortmund	West Germany	Westfalenhallen
28 April 1978	West Berlin	West Germany	Deutschlandhalle
30 April 1978	Zürich	Switzerland	Hallenstadion
2 May 1978	Vienna	Austria	Wiener Stadthalle
3 May 1978	Munich	West Germany	Olympiahalle
6 May 1978	Stafford	England	Bingley Hall
7 May 1978	Stafford	England	Bingley Hall
11 May 1978	London	England	Wembley Arena
12 May 1978	London	England	Wembley Arena
13 May 1978	London	England	Wembley Arena

=== Box office score data ===
List of box office score data with date, city, venue, attendance, gross, references
Date (1977)	City	Venue	Attendance	Gross	Ref(s)
11 November	Portland, United States	Cumberland County Civic Center	8,600 / 8,600	$55,649	
12 November	Boston, United States	Boston Garden	15,411 / 15,411	$122,959	
16 November	New Haven, United States	New Haven Coliseum	9,900 / 9,900	$71,259	
18 November	Detroit, United States	Cobo Arena	22,323	$184,477	
19 November	Detroit, United States	Cobo Arena	22,323	$184,477	

== Personnel ==
- Freddie Mercury – lead and backing vocals, piano, tambourine on "Keep Yourself Alive"
- Brian May – electric guitar, acoustic guitar and backing vocals
- Roger Taylor – drums, lead vocals (on "I'm in Love with My Car") backing vocals, tambourine and bass drum on "'39"
- John Deacon – bass guitar and additional vocals

== Reception and recollections ==
In the book The Show I'll Never Forget: 50 Writers Relive Their Most Memorable Concertgoing Experience, novelist Tracy Chevalier recalls attending one of this tour's concerts at the age of 15:

The band wisely didn't dare attempt to reproduce in its entirety the long, baroque confection that is Bohemian Rhapsody. For the infamous operatic middle section, the band members left the stage as the studio recording played. Freddie and Brian then changed costume, and, at the word "Beelzebub", all four men popped out of a door in the stage floor and joined live again for the heavy metal section, fireworks going off, dry ice pouring out, everyone going berserk, me in tears of excitement. It was one of the best live moments I've ever witnessed. Indeed, I was spoiled by seeing Queen play live before anyone else; for sheer exuberant theatricality, no one else has come close.

Robert Hilburn of the Los Angeles Times called this concert tour the band's "most spectacularly staged and finely honed show yet".

"We arrived in Las Vegas on Monday," recalled Old Grey Whistle Test presenter Bob Harris, who was travelling with the band for a filmed piece, "and the band weren't playing until Thursday, so we had three days to party… On the Thursday, when the band were playing, they got the four limos to park at the back of the Aladdin. Each of them got in, then the limos drove them round to the front, where they got out and walked into the hotel for the gig. You have to do it; it's the rock 'n' roll way. You can't just walk into the lobby!"
