= News of the World (album) =

1977 studio album by Queen

Studio album by Queen
- Released: 28 October 1977
- Recorded: 6 July – 16 September 1977
- Studios: Sarm East (London); Wessex Sound (London)
- Genres: Hard rock; arena rock
- Length: 39:10
- Labels: EMI; Elektra
- Producers: Queen; Mike Stone

Queen chronology
A Day at the Races (1976)	News of the World (1977)	Jazz (1978)

Alternative cover
- Cover sold in Korean stores

Singles from News of the World
- 1. "We Are the Champions" / "We Will Rock You" Released: 7 October 1977; 2. "Spread Your Wings" Released: 10 February 1978 (Europe); 3. "It's Late" Released: 25 April 1978

News of the World is the sixth studio album by the British rock band Queen, released on 28 October 1977 by EMI Records in the United Kingdom and by Elektra Records in the United States. News of the World was the band's second album to be recorded at Sarm and Wessex Sound Studios in London, and engineered by Mike Stone, and was co-produced by the band and Stone.

In 1977, punk rock acts, most notably the Sex Pistols, sparked massive backlash against progressive rock artists such as Queen, to which the band responded by simplifying their symphonic rock sound and gearing towards a more spontaneous hard rock sound. The album subsequently reached number 4 on the UK Albums Chart and number 3 on the US Top Albums chart while achieving high certifications around the world. It has sold over 4 million copies in United States. Its lead single, "We Are the Champions", reached number 2 on the UK Singles Chart and number 4 on the US Billboard Hot 100. Critical reaction to News of the World was initially mixed, with many reviewers commenting on the band's change in musical style. However, it has since come to be regarded as one of Queen's greatest albums, while "We Are the Champions" and "We Will Rock You", often played back to back on radio, have become rock anthems.

== Background and recording ==
"I feel the Queen style of well-produced or production sort of albums is over. We've done to death multi-tracked harmonies and, for our own sakes and for the public's, we want to go on to a different sort of project. And the next album will be that."

— Freddie Mercury

After completing the "A Day at the Races Tour" in June 1977, the quartet entered the studio to begin work on their sixth studio offering in July 1977, enlisting Mike Stone as assistant producer at Sarm East and Wessex studios in London. The initial activity began on 4 July when Taylor and assistant 'Crystal' Taylor arrived in a lorry at Sarm to set up his drum kit, which continued over the next two days. That Wednesday, on 6 July, the rest of the band arrived at Sarm. They did backing track takes for "It's Late".

After recording all the backing tracks, work moved to Wessex Sound, again preceded by two days dedicated to drum kit set up. The lorry arrived on 1 August, and drum kit construction would continue well into 2 August. Andy Turner, a tea boy at Wessex, recalls thinking "You're being charged £200 an hour for this!" At Wessex, the band overdubbed onto the backing tracks. Some songs had been previously overdubbed, such as "It's Late", "Who Needs You", "All Dead All Dead", and "Sleeping on the Sidewalk". During the last few days of overdubbing, on 22 August, calls to the U.S. would be made regarding venues for the band's tour in November.

According to studio documentation, a lot of sessions had late arrivals, which were usually pre-arranged around an hour before the band would actually arrive. The median shift length was around 3–11pm, but sometimes the band would stay in the studio until 4am if they were falling behind schedule. The last principal overdubbing session was on 23 August, with the first mixes the next day on 24 August. Occasionally, further overdubbing would occur, as mixing continued. On 26 August, "We Are The Champions" was mixed, followed by "Spread Your Wings", and "We Will Rock You" on 27 August, and Take 12 of "Sheer Heart Attack" on 28 August.

After taking a day off for the Summer Bank Holiday, the band went to Leighton Mans Studios and Primrose Hill Studios on 30 August, although the output of these sessions is unknown. They also spent a day at Olympic Studios on 31 August. The last documented overdubbing session was on 1 September. Mixing continued until 4 September at Wessex, during which there was a delay on 3 September due to technical issues. That day, Roger appeared on the last episode of the show "Saturday Scene". The mixes were delivered back to Sarm Studios on 5 September for mastering, which would be completed on 16 September.

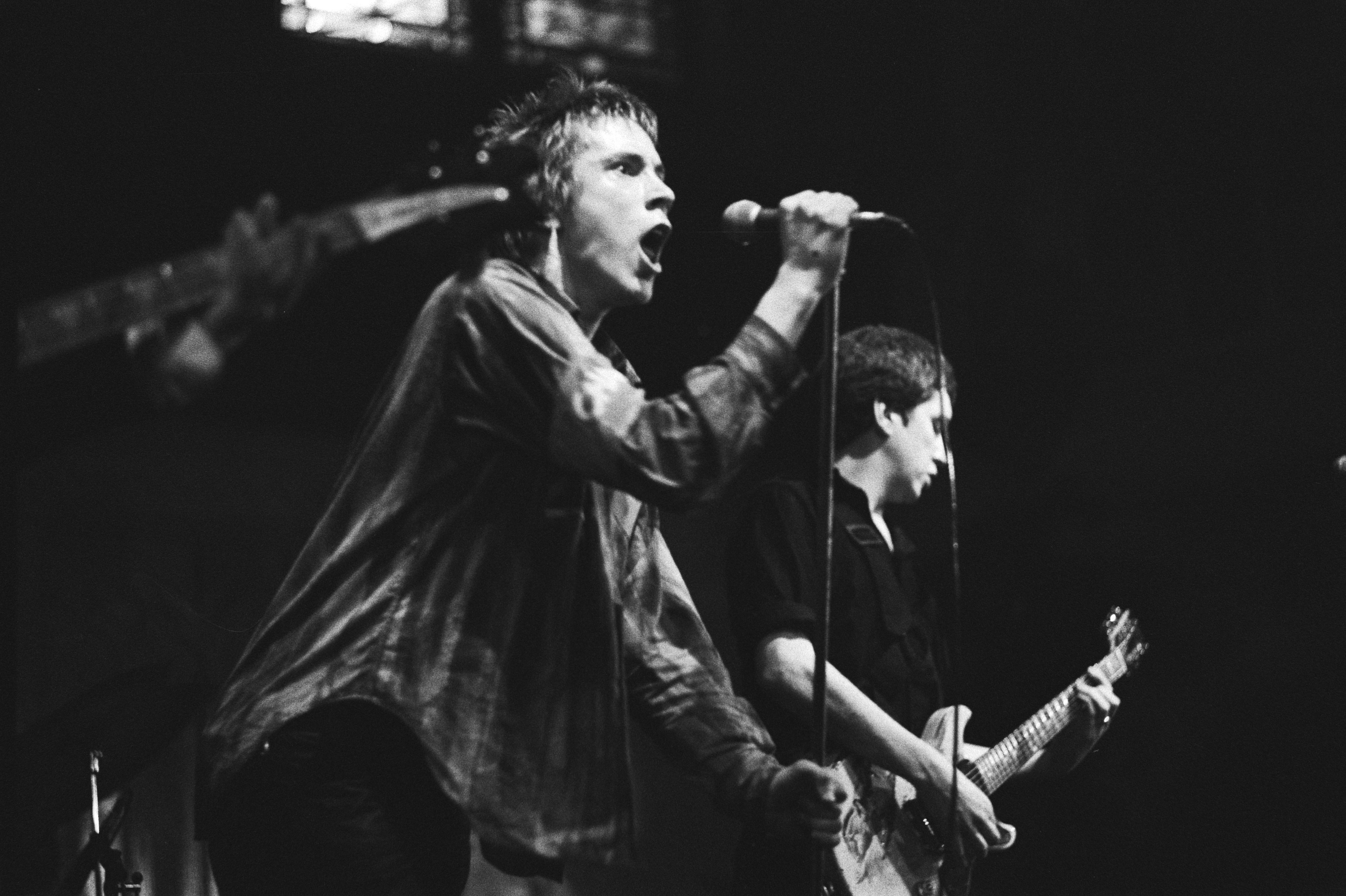
Queen's shift to a harder sound occurred amidst the rise of punk rock acts such as the Sex Pistols. Both bands interacted with one another during the album's recording.

They scaled down their complex arrangements and focused on a "rootsier" sound (as Brian May put it). However, the staple of the Queen sound – multi-tracked harmonies and guitar orchestrations – still exist on this album, albeit more subtly than previously. Having received some criticism that their first completely self-produced album, A Day at the Races, was a "boring" album, Queen decided to shift their musical focus towards the mainstream but remain as the producers of the next album. Races garnered criticism as many critics felt that it was too similar to A Night at the Opera, something which the band members themselves acknowledged. In addition, the arrival of punk rock, led by the Sex Pistols, saw the mainstream shift away from progressive rock and more towards simpler rock music. Queen were seen as the antithesis of punk, particularly in their camp influences and elaborate production.

Brian May stated in an interview that "We'd already made a decision that...[after] A Night at the Opera and A Day at the Races, we wanted to go back to basics for News of the World. But it was very timely because the world was looking at punk and things being very stripped down. So in a sense we were conscious, but it was part of our evolution anyway."

In contrast to A Day at the Races, which had taken five months to record, only two months were booked to record at Sarm East and Wessex Sound Studios. Most of the recording sessions took place in Wessex Studios, which was also where the Sex Pistols were busy recording Never Mind the Bollocks, Here's the Sex Pistols. As such, the two groups had several interactions, including the famous meeting between Mercury and Sid Vicious. Vicious, upon stumbling into Queen's recording studio, asked "Have you succeeded in bringing ballet to the masses yet?" in response to a comment the singer had made in an interview with NME, to which Mercury called him "Simon Ferocious" (a playful reference to Vicious' stage name) and replied "We're doing our best, dear." Johnny Rotten also expressed a desire to meet with Mercury. According to Bill Price, who engineered Never Mind the Bollocks, Rotten crawled on all fours across Queen's studio to Mercury, who was playing piano, and said "Hello Freddie" before leaving. Queen's history with the Sex Pistols dated back to December 1976, in which Queen were set to appear on Bill Grundy's Today show. However, Mercury had a toothache, and was forced to schedule a dentist appointment on the same day, his first one in 15 years. As a replacement, EMI offered the Sex Pistols instead, which led to their now famous appearance on the Today show.

== Songs ==
=== Overview ===
News of the World shows Queen's songwriting less dominated by Mercury and May than previously, with Roger Taylor and John Deacon composing two songs each. It has been classified as hard rock and arena rock, and has been regarded as a transitional album due to its shift towards a more minimalist production. Its songs are notable for their eclectic themes which would crystallise on future albums Jazz and The Game: "We Will Rock You" and "We Are the Champions" are arena rock, "Who Needs You" features a Latin influence, "Sheer Heart Attack" is punk rock, "Sleeping on the Sidewalk" is based upon blues rock, "Get Down, Make Love" features funk overtones, "My Melancholy Blues" is a blues number and "Fight from the Inside" was the group's first disco related song. Chuck Eddy said the album was widely regarded as a "back-to-basics" offering, minimising the group's more ornate and "multi-part-epic tendencies", with some even dubbing it Queen's response to punk rock. He added, however, that the record "sounds even more often like a response to funk", citing "Fight from the Inside" and "Get Down, Make Love", as well as the "proto-rap sparseness" of "We Will Rock You".

=== Side one ===
==== "We Will Rock You" ====
"We Will Rock You" (sample) was released as the B-side of "We Are the Champions", and became one of Queen's biggest songs worldwide as a staple of arena and stadium sets. It was a conscious decision by Brian May to make the song simple and anthemic ('stomp, stomp, clap, pause' per 4/4 measure), so that their live audience could be more directly involved in the show. In the videos for 'We Will Rock You' and 'Spread Your Wings', which shows the band performing in the snow in Roger Taylor's garden, May used a copy of his guitar. He supposedly did not want to submit his Red Special to the weather.

On 7 October 2017, Queen released a Raw Sessions version of the track to celebrate the 40th anniversary of the release of News of the World. It shows a radically different approach to the guitar solo and includes May's count-in immediately prior to the recording.

==== "We Are the Champions" ====
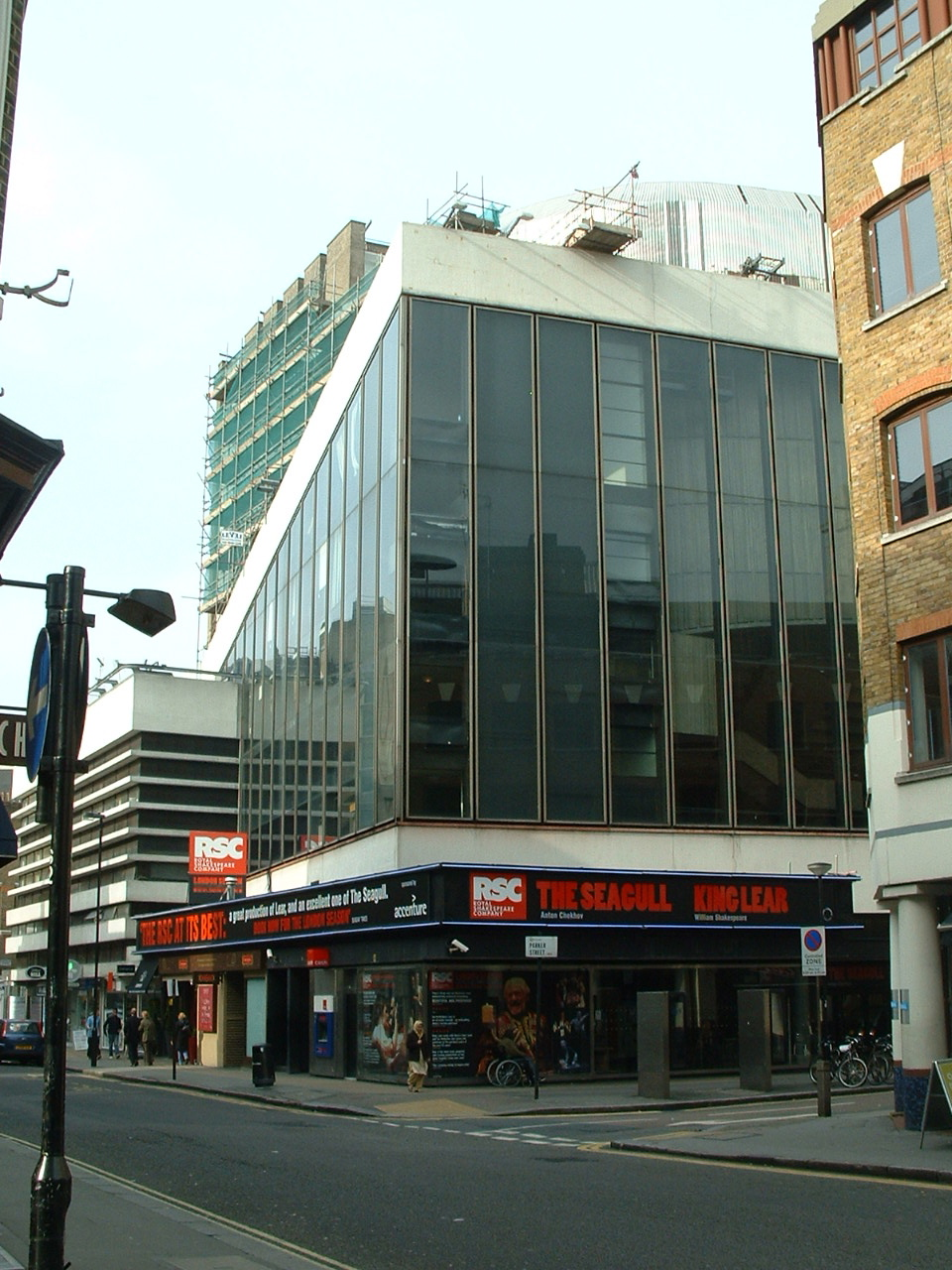
The music video for "We Are the Champions" was shot at the New London Theatre.

According to Freddie Mercury, "We Are the Champions" had already been written in 1975 but was not recorded until 1977. Released as a single with "We Will Rock You", "We Are the Champions" reached number two in the UK and number four in the US. "We Are the Champions" was the first promotional video for which fan club members were invited to participate in the filming. The video was filmed at the New London Theatre on 6 October 1977. Everyone received a free single of "We Are the Champions", a day before the single was released. To thank the audience for their attendance and role in making the video, Queen performed a short free concert after the shoot. It is one of the band's most popular songs.

On 7 October 2017, Queen released a Raw Sessions version of the track to celebrate the 40th anniversary of the release of News of the World. It was made from previously unheard vocal and instrumental takes from the original multi-track tapes. It also presents for the first time the original recorded length of the track, which is two choruses more than the 1977 edited single.

==== "Sheer Heart Attack" ====
"Sheer Heart Attack" was half-finished at the time of the 1974 album of the same name. Freddie Mercury sang lead and backing vocals. Taylor sang lead vocals and backing vocals. Rhythm guitar and bass were played by Taylor, apart from some guitar "screams" by May during the instrumental section. According to Eddy, the song is the "most punk-sounding" Queen song, highlighting its "proto-no-wave guitar solo and proto-Devo lyrics blaming teenage angst on D.N.A. (i.e., nature not nurture)", and the "toppling-over-itself tempo" later reprised by Prince's "own punkest song" "Sister" (1980).

==== "All Dead, All Dead" ====
"All Dead, All Dead" was written and sung by May, who also played piano with Mercury on backing vocals. In an episode of In the Studio with Redbeard, May confirmed rumours that the song is partly inspired by the death of his boyhood pet cat.

On 27 October 2017, in celebration of the album's 40th Anniversary, Queen released a specially created "hybrid version" of the track with previously unheard lead vocals by Mercury. It was accompanied with an animated lyric video of a cat exploring a place that is later revealed to be the inside of the robot of the album cover lying motionless in a field.

==== "Spread Your Wings" ====
"Spread Your Wings" was written by bassist John Deacon. The piano is played by Mercury, although Deacon mimes it in the music video. The video was filmed in the back garden of Taylor's then house, when the weather was freezing, and the band performed in the snow. Mercury can be seen wearing star-shaped sunglasses in the video. May is seen playing a copy of his Red Special, owing to the cold weather conditions.

==== "Fight from the Inside" ====
"Fight from the Inside" was written and sung by Taylor. In addition to the drums, he also plays rhythm guitar and bass guitar; for the latter he borrowed Deacon's instrument. It is also one of the few songs in the band's discography recorded almost entirely by one member.

Guitarist Slash has cited the guitar riff to this song as one of his favourite riffs of all time.

=== Side two ===
==== "Get Down, Make Love" ====
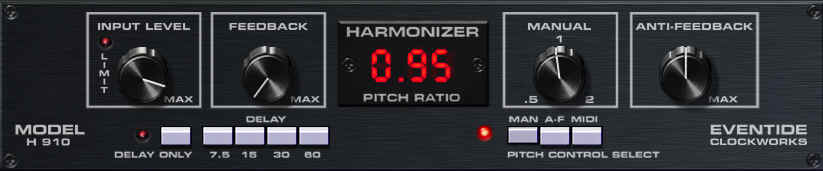
"Get Down, Make Love" makes use of an Eventide Harmonizer for its "psychedelic" sound effects.

"Get Down, Make Love", written by Mercury, is among the most sexually oriented songs in the Queen catalogue. Eddy calls it one of the album's funkier tracks, with a "proto-industrial-music perviness" which eventually morph into "sex-moaning psychedelic spaces" that constitute a form of 'dub-metal' comparable to similar parts of Led Zeppelin's "Whole Lotta Love".

The song was introduced into the band's live show immediately after its release, and remained a staple of their "medley" until the end of the Hot Space Tour of 1982. On the Hot Space tour, the song was reduced to the first verse/chorus only as a way to lead into May's guitar solo. In live versions of this song, Taylor used Latin-influenced percussion with timbales on the News of the World Tour, and tightly tuned Remo Rototoms on the Jazz, Crazy, The Game and Hot Space tours, along with Queen's tours with Paul Rodgers and with Adam Lambert.

The distinctive 'psychedelic' sound effects heard in the song were not produced on a synthesiser, but on May's Red Special and an Electroharmonix Frequency Analyzer pedal, which he would often do live. The studio cut made use of an Eventide Harmonizer. These sound effects, together with Mercury's moans and groans, were expanded upon during live renditions of the song, the band taking an opportunity to show off the full potential of their stage lights and effects.

A more aggressive version of this song was covered by the industrial rock band Nine Inch Nails as a B-side for the 1990 single, "Sin". It was later added as a bonus track to the 2010 remastered edition of Pretty Hate Machine.

==== "Sleeping on the Sidewalk" ====
"Sleeping on the Sidewalk", a blues excursion, was written and sung by May. It is the only song in their discography to be recorded (except for the vocals) in one take. Lyrically, it deals with an aspiring trumpet player's career, delivered in a "rags-to-riches" fashion. May sings with an American accent and measures the aforementioned trumpet player's success by "bucks" (dollars), as opposed to pounds or "quid". On a close inspection, Deacon can be heard playing the wrong notes in some bass parts, and May can also be heard laughing at the end of the song. It is also one of the few Queen songs not to feature any vocals by Mercury, although he did perform lead vocals in live performances.

The band's web site states they were unaware that they were being recorded, but May has cast doubt on the authenticity of this, though has confirmed the first take of the backing track was used.

==== "Who Needs You" ====
"Who Needs You" was a song written by Deacon, who, along with May, plays Spanish guitar. Mercury's lead vocal is entirely panned on the right audio channel while the lead guitar is on the left channel. May also plays maracas and Mercury plays a cowbell. It has been described as a "tentative reggae homage", albeit with "Spanish rather than Jamaican guitars".

==== "It's Late" ====
"It's Late", written by May, was his idea of treating a song as a three-act theatrical play. It makes use of the tapping technique.

==== "My Melancholy Blues" ====
"My Melancholy Blues" was composed by Mercury. There are no backing vocals or guitars. Deacon played fretless bass on stage during this song but used a regular fretted bass on the record.

== Artwork and packaging ==
For the album cover, Frank Kelly Freas repainted his illustration for the October 1953 issue of Astounding Science Fiction.

The album's cover was a painting by American sci-fi artist Frank Kelly Freas. Taylor had an issue of Astounding Science Fiction (October 1953) whose cover art depicted a giant intelligent robot holding the dead body of a man. The caption read: "Please... fix it, Daddy?" to illustrate the story "The Gulf Between" by Tom Godwin. The painting inspired the band to contact Freas, who agreed to alter the painting for their album cover, by replacing the single dead man with the four "dead" band members (with Mercury and May dead in the robot's hand—Mercury bleeding from his chest and blood on the robot's middle finger of its opposite hand—and with Taylor and Deacon falling to the ground, Taylor only visible on the back cover).

The inner cover (gatefold) has the robot extending its hand to snatch up the petrified fleeing audience in the shattered auditorium where the corpses were removed. Freas said he was a classical music fan and did not know Queen, and only listened to the band after doing the cover "because I thought I might just hate them, and it would ruin my ideas", but eventually liked their music.

== Release ==
=== Singles ===
- "We Are the Champions" was released as the first single from the album on 7 October 1977 in the UK, where it reached number 2. In the US it reached number 4.
- "Spread Your Wings" followed as the second single. Released in the UK on 10 February 1978, it reached number 34.
- "It's Late" is the last single from the album; it was released in 1978, and only in the US, Canada, Japan and New Zealand. It only reached number 74 in the US, failing to chart everywhere else.

=== Tour ===
The News of the World Tour was a concert tour by Queen to promote the album. Queen played 26 shows in North America and 21 in Europe, beginning on 11 November 1977 in Portland, United States and concluding the tour on 13 May 1978 in London.

=== Re-issues ===
In May 2011, a remastered and expanded reissue of the album was released. This was part of a new record deal between Queen and Universal Music, which meant Queen's association with EMI Records would come to an end after almost 40 years. According to Universal Music, all Queen albums would be remastered and reissued in 2011. This reissue included a deluxe edition which contains five additional tracks. The second batch of albums (the band's middle five albums) was released in June 2011.

On 4 September 2017, Queen released a multi-format deluxe boxset marking the 40th anniversary of the album's original issue by the Virgin EMI label. The set contains previously unreleased outtakes and rarities from the band's archives, in the form of a newly created "alternative" version of the entire album, dubbed Raw Sessions. The boxset also includes a pure analogue vinyl LP, cut from the original analogue master mix tapes, and a brand new one-hour DVD documentary created from backstage material filmed during the North American leg of Queen's 1977 News of the World Tour.

In promotion of the anniversary release, on 6 October Queen released the previously unheard Raw Sessions of "We Are the Champions" and "We Will Rock You". On 27 October, the band published on their official YouTube channel a new version of "All Dead, All Dead" with previously unheard lead vocals by Mercury, and was accompanied with an animated lyric video. The box set was officially released on 17 November 2017.

== Reception ==
Professional ratings
Review scores
Source	Rating
AllMusic	3.5/5 stars
Chicago Tribune	2.5/4 stars
Christgau's Record Guide	C
Classic Rock	4.5/5 stars
The Daily Vault	A
The Encyclopedia of Popular Music	2/5 stars
MusicHound Rock	4/5 stars
Q	3/5 stars
Rolling Stone	2.5/5 stars
The Rolling Stone Album Guide	2.5/5 stars

News of the World initially received mixed reviews, mostly reflecting on the album's shift towards a more minimalist sound, and away from the band's previous predominantly progressive rock sound. The Washington Post commended the band's experimentation within a range of hard rock to soft rock, while Rolling Stone magazine's Bart Testa noted, "Most of the songs on News of the World either challenge Queen's artistic enemies or endeavor to establish a vision of the new order." He further dismissed the album as "the salient fictions of which today's Top Ten albums are made." For The Village Voice in 1977, Robert Christgau said that one side of the album is devoted to "the futile rebelliousness of the doomed-to-life losers (those saps!) (you saps!) who buy and listen", while the other is devoted to songs about indecent women.

The Daily Mirror hailed it as the "most intriguing Queen album since their finest, Sheer Heart Attack," commenting that "whether all the obvious tension within the band will spur them on, or simply pull them apart, remains to be seen." Although Sounds dismissed side one as "foreboding", they reacted positively to side two, particularly praising "My Melancholy Blues". The Valley News criticised it as being "tamer" than the band's first four albums, but concluded that "Queen still pulls off top honors," particularly praising the production, Mercury's vocals and May's guitar work. In a mixed review, Record Mirror described News as "Queen stripped down to almost basics...it's not a bad album by any means, but it could have been better."

Retrospective reviews of the album have been unanimous in praise, and is now regarded as one of Queen's greatest works. Stephen Thomas Erlewine of AllMusic noted the eclecticism in comparison to "A Day at the Races", describing it as "an explosion of styles that didn't seem to hold to any particular center." He praised May's contributions for giving the album "some lightness", and concluded that "when it works, it's massive, earth-shaking rock & roll, the sound of a band beginning to revel in its superstardom." In Creem magazine's annual poll, readers voted News of the World as the 19th best album of 1977. BBC Music's Daryl Easlea said that the album is an exceptional showcase of "Queen's unerring ability to sound absolutely like no-other group – even when parodying other musical styles". Greg Kot of the Chicago Tribune gave the album a generally positive rating, and observed that Queen had "ventured deeper into stadium rock", while Brendan Schroer of Sputnikmusic also noted the relation to stadium rock, calling it "the great arena rock wonder" with very few flaws.

The 40th anniversary release prompted several more reviews, with David Chiu of The Quietus calling it "a work that had swagger and attitude", while Loudersound wrote that "Despite damping down their instincts so punks wouldn't spit at them, they still sound like flamboyance has burst through the wall, riding a Harley and wearing a tiara." Several publications have hailed it as one of the band's greatest albums. NME ranked it as the best Queen album, describing it as "their sharpest, surest set", while Christopher Thelen of the Daily Vault praised it for being "the best mixture of musical styles they had ever achieved" and Queen's "creative peak".

== In popular culture ==
The album as a whole has been released on Super Audio CD. In 2012, the TV show Family Guy dedicated an episode plot line to the album cover, in which the character Stewie Griffin is frightened of the cover. Show creator Seth MacFarlane stated that it was based on his own fear of the cover when he was a child.

Marvel paid tribute to News of the World on a variant cover of X-Men Gold #11. The cover, by artist Mike del Mundo, depicts a Sentinel holding Old Man Logan and Kitty Pryde as Colossus plummets to the ground; the subtitle "This Is Their World" is above the image. For London Comic Con 2017, Marvel and Queen released a limited-edition vinyl pressing of the album with the X-Men cover on one side and the original on the other.

The giant robot from the album cover, also known as "Frank", was used as a special effect during the songs "We Will Rock You" and "Killer Queen" for the 2017–18 Queen + Adam Lambert Tour, which was in celebration of the album's 40th anniversary.

== Track listing ==
All lead vocals by Freddie Mercury unless noted.

=== Original release ===
Side one
No.	Title	Writer(s)	Lead vocals	Length
1.	"We Will Rock You"	Brian May		2:01
2.	"We Are the Champions"	Mercury		2:59
3.	"Sheer Heart Attack"	Roger Taylor	Mercury and Taylor	3:26
4.	"All Dead, All Dead"	May	May	3:10
5.	"Spread Your Wings"	John Deacon		4:34
6.	"Fight from the Inside"	Taylor	Taylor	3:03

Side two
No.	Title	Writer(s)	Lead vocals	Length
7.	"Get Down, Make Love"	Mercury		3:51
8.	"Sleeping on the Sidewalk"	May	May	3:06
9.	"Who Needs You"	Deacon		3:05
10.	"It's Late"	May		6:26
11.	"My Melancholy Blues"	Mercury		3:29
Total length:				39:10

Bonus tracks (1991 Hollywood Records CD reissue)
No.	Title	Length
12.	"We Will Rock You" (1991 bonus remix by Rick Rubin)	4:58
Total length:		44:08

Disc 2: Bonus EP (2011 Universal Music CD reissue)
No.	Title	Writer(s)	Length
1.	"Feelings Feelings" (Take 10, July 1977)	May	1:54
2.	"Spread Your Wings" (BBC session, October 1977)	Deacon	5:25
3.	"My Melancholy Blues" (BBC session, October 1977)	Mercury	3:12
4.	"Sheer Heart Attack" (Live in Paris, France, 28 February 1979)	Taylor	3:34
5.	"We Will Rock You" (Fast) (Live in Tokorozawa, Japan, November 1982)	May	2:54
Total length:			16:59

Bonus videos (2011 iTunes deluxe edition)
No.	Title	Length
6.	"My Melancholy Blues" (live at the Summit, 1977)	3:54
7.	"Sheer Heart Attack" (live at Hammersmith, 1979)	3:13
8.	"We Will Rock You" (Queen Rocks version, 1998)	2:04
Total length:		25:30

=== 40th anniversary edition ===
The multi-format deluxe box set, released in 2017, contains previously unreleased outtakes and rarities from the band's archives, as well as a newly created "alternative" version of the entire album, dubbed Raw Sessions. The box set includes a pure analogue vinyl LP, cut from the original analogue master mix tapes, and a brand new one-hour DVD documentary created from backstage material filmed during the North American leg of Queen's 1977 News of the World tour.

CD two: Raw Sessions
No.	Title	Length
1.	"We Will Rock You" (Alternative Version)	2:26
2.	"We Are the Champions" (Alternative Version)	4:33
3.	"Sheer Heart Attack" (Original Rough Mix)	4:17
4.	"All Dead, All Dead" (Original Rough Mix)	3:08
5.	"Spread Your Wings" (Alternative Take)	4:56
6.	"Fight from the Inside" (Demo Vocal Version)	3:08
7.	"Get Down, Make Love" (Early Take)	4:02
8.	"Sleeping on the Sidewalk" (Live in the USA, 1977)	3:49
9.	"Who Needs You" (Acoustic Take)	2:49
10.	"It's Late" (Alternative Version)	6:44
11.	"My Melancholy Blues" (Original Rough Mix)	3:36
Total length:		50:38

CD three: Bonus Tracks
No.	Title	Original release	Length
1.	"Feelings Feelings" (Take 10, July 1977)	2011 Bonus EP	1:55
2.	"We Will Rock You" (BBC Session)	On Air, 2016	1:36
3.	"We Will Rock You (Fast)" (BBC Session)	On Air	2:52
4.	"Spread Your Wings" (BBC Session)	2011 Bonus EP	5:33
5.	"It's Late" (BBC Session)	On Air	6:39
6.	"My Melancholy Blues" (BBC Session)	2011 Bonus EP	3:13
7.	"We Will Rock You" (Backing Track)	Previously unreleased	2:03
8.	"We Are the Champions" (Backing Track)	Previously unreleased	2:59
9.	"Spread Your Wings" (Instrumental)	Previously unreleased	4:23
10.	"Fight from the Inside" (Instrumental)	Previously unreleased	3:02
11.	"Get Down, Make Love" (Instrumental)	Previously unreleased	3:49
12.	"It's Late" (USA Radio Edit 1978)	"It's Late" single, 1978	3:52
13.	"Sheer Heart Attack" (Live in Paris, February 1979)	2011 Bonus EP	3:35
14.	"We Will Rock You (Fast)" (Live in Tokorozawa, November 1982)	2011 Bonus EP	2:59
15.	"My Melancholy Blues" (Live in Houston, December 1977)	"The Miracle" single, 1989	4:11
16.	"Get Down, Make Love" (Live in Montreal, November 1981)	Queen Rock Montreal, 2007	4:35
17.	"Spread Your Wings" (Live in Europe, February 1979)	Live Killers, 1979	5:20
18.	"We Will Rock You" (Live at the Milton Keynes Bowl, June 1982)	Queen on Fire – Live at the Bowl, 2004	2:08
19.	"We Are the Champions" (Live at the Milton Keynes Bowl, June 1982)	Queen on Fire – Live at the Bowl	3:32
Total length:			1:08:16

DVD: Queen: The American Dream
No.	Title	Length
1.	"Back into the Studio"
2.	"We Will Rock You / We Are the Champions"
3.	"Taking Control"
4.	"Sheer Heart Attack"
5.	"The American Tour"
6.	"It's Late"
7.	"Spread Your Wings"
8.	"My Melancholy Blues"
9.	"Get Down, Make Love"
10.	"We Are the Champions"

== Personnel ==
Information is based on the album's liner notes
Track numbering refers to CD and digital releases of the album.

Queen

- Freddie Mercury – vocals, piano; hand claps and foot stamping (1), cowbell (9)
- Brian May – electric guitar (all except 11), backing vocals; lead vocals (4, 8), acoustic guitar (9), piano (4), hand claps and foot stamping (1), maracas (9)
- Roger Taylor – drums (all except 1), backing vocals; lead vocals (3, 6), rhythm guitar and bass guitar (3, 6), hand claps and foot stamping (1)
- John Deacon – bass guitar (2, 4, 5, 7–11), acoustic guitar (5, 9), hand claps and foot stamping (1)

Production

- Queen – production
- Mike Stone – production assistant

== Charts ==
=== Weekly charts ===
Chart (1977–1978)	Peak position
Australian Albums (Kent Music Report)	8
Austrian Albums (Ö3 Austria)	9
Canada Top Albums/CDs (RPM)	2
Dutch Albums (Album Top 100)	1
Finnish Albums (The Official Finnish Charts)	9
French Albums (SNEP)	1
German Albums (Offizielle Top 100)	7
Japanese Albums (Oricon)	3
New Zealand Albums (RMNZ)	15
Norwegian Albums (VG-lista)	4
Swedish Albums (Sverigetopplistan)	9
UK Albums (Official Charts)	4
US Billboard 200	3

Chart (2018)	Peak position
Portuguese Albums (AFP)	22

Chart (2019)	Peak position
Belgian Albums (Ultratop Wallonia)	98
Italian Albums (FIMI)	95

Chart (2026)	Peak position
Greek Albums (IFPI)	45
Greek Albums (IFPI) 2026 reissue	68

=== Year-end charts ===
Chart (1978)	Position
German Albums (Offizielle Top 100)	13

== Certifications ==
Region	Certification	Certified units/sales
Belgium (BRMA)	Gold	25,000^{*}
Canada (Music Canada)	3× Platinum	300,000^{^}
France (SNEP)	Gold	100,000^{*}
Germany (BVMI)	Platinum	500,000^{^}
Italy (FIMI) sales + streams since 2009	Platinum	50,000^{‡}
Netherlands (NVPI)	Platinum	100,000^{^}
Poland (ZPAV) 2008 Agora SA album reissue	Platinum	20,000^{*}
South Africa (RISA)	Gold	25,000^{*}
Switzerland (IFPI Switzerland)	Platinum	50,000^{^}
United Kingdom (BPI)	Gold	100,000^{^}
United States (RIAA)	4× Platinum	4,000,000^{^}
^{*} Sales figures based on certification alone.^{^} Shipments figures based on certification alone.^{‡} Sales+streaming figures based on certification alone.
