= Save Me (Queen song) =

- UK picture sleeve

Single by Queen

from the album The Game
- B-side: "Let Me Entertain You (live)" (UK); "Sheer Heart Attack (live)" (Japan)
- Released: 25 January 1980 (UK); April 1980 (Japan)
- Recorded: June–July 1979
- Genre: Pop
- Length: 3:48
- Label: EMI (UK); Elektra (Japan)
- Songwriter: Brian May
- Producer: Queen

Queen singles chronology
| "Crazy Little Thing Called Love" (1979) | "Save Me" (1980) | "Play the Game" (1980) |

Music video
- "Save Me" on YouTube

"Save Me" is a song by the British rock band Queen from their 1980 album The Game. Written by guitarist Brian May, it was recorded in 1979, and released in the UK on 25 January 1980, nearly six months prior to the release of the album. "Save Me" spent six weeks on the UK Singles Chart, peaking at number 11. It was the band's first single release of the 1980s.

The power ballad was played live from 1979 to 1982 and was recorded for their live albums, Queen Rock Montreal at the Montreal Forum, Quebec, Canada in November 1981 and Queen on Fire – Live at the Bowl at the Milton Keynes Bowl, Buckinghamshire, England in June 1982. The song is also included on Queen's Greatest Hits, and Queen Forever albums.

== History ==
The song was recorded in the summer of 1979 in Munich. During an interview for the radio show In the Studio with Redbeard, May stated: "I wrote ['Save Me']—to cut a long story short—I wrote it about a friend, someone who was going through a bad time, and I imagined myself in their shoes, kind of telling the story. Someone whose relationship is totally fucked up and how sad that person was."

== Technical details ==
Musically, the song is complex, with the verses in the key of G major, and the chorus in the key of D major. An instrumental solo, in the related key of G major, serves as a verse.

== Music video ==
The video for the song was filmed at Alexandra Palace on 22 December 1979 and directed by Keith "Keef" MacMillan and features animation of a woman and a dove. The video would be the last to feature Mercury without a moustache until 1984, as he would sport it starting with the next video for "Play the Game"

== Personnel ==
- Freddie Mercury – lead and backing vocals
- Brian May – acoustic and electric guitars, piano, synthesizer, backing vocals
- Roger Taylor – drums, backing vocals
- John Deacon – bass guitar

Additional musicians

- Reinhold Mack – additional synthesizer

== Charts ==
=== Weekly charts ===
| Chart (1980) | Peak position |
|---|---|
| Belgium (Ultratop 50 Flanders) | 13 |
| Italy (FIMI) | 31 |
| Netherlands (Dutch Top 40) | 5 |
| Netherlands (Single Top 100) | 6 |
| Norway (VG-lista) | 7 |
| UK Singles (Official Charts) | 11 |
| West Germany (GfK) | 42 |

=== Year-end charts ===
| Chart (1980) | Position |
|---|---|
| Belgium (Ultratop Flanders) | 98 |
| Italy (FIMI) | 96 |
| Netherlands (Dutch Top 40) | 60 |
| Netherlands (Single Top 100) | 80 |
