= Queen Rock Montreal =

Live album by Queen
- Released: 29 October 2007
- Recorded: 24–25 November 1981; 1982 (overdubs); May 2007 (pitch-corrections)
- Venues: Montreal Forum, Montreal, Canada
- Genre: Rock
- Length: 97:49
- Labels: EMI/Parlophone (UK); Hollywood (US)
- Producers: Justin Shirley-Smith; Kris Fredriksson; Josh Macrae

Queen chronology
The A–Z of Queen, Volume 1 (2007)	Queen Rock Montreal (2007)	The Singles Collection Volume 1 (2008)

Queen Rock Montreal & Live Aid
- Starring: Freddie Mercury; Brian May; Roger Taylor; John Deacon
- Cinematography: Richard E. Brooks
- Music by: Queen
- Release date: 2007
- Running time: 137 minutes

Professional ratings
Review scores
Source	Rating
AllMusic	4/5 stars
The Rolling Stone Album Guide	2.5/5 stars

Queen Rock Montreal is a concert film/live album by the British rock band Queen. It was released on 29 October 2007 as a double CD, Blu-ray, DVD, and triple vinyl in the UK and the following day in the US. It was recorded in Montreal, Quebec, at the Montreal Forum on 24 November and 25 November 1981. AllMusic described Queen's performance as being "deliberately theatrical and often majestic".

Unlike the original video release of We Will Rock You, this album features the full show (including "Flash" and "The Hero") fully remixed. Its soundtrack was released on double CD (by Hollywood Records for the US and Canada and by Parlophone Records for Europe and EMI for the rest of the world) and triple vinyl LP. A special double DVD Queen Rock Montreal & Live Aid included Queen's performance at Live Aid as well as never before seen interviews and rehearsal footage. HD-DVD and Blu-ray versions were released on 4 December 2007.

== Theatrical release ==
In November 2023 it was announced that the concert film would be released in IMAX from 18 January 2024 to 21 January 2024. Due to high demand, this limited theatrical run was extended through to 28 January 2024. The concert was remastered and given a limited theatrical release in January 2024 and released on all formats including 4K Ultra HD Blu-ray later the same year, giving the option to watch it in its original full-frame aspect ratio or cropped to 16:9 widescreen as per the 2007 release. This release is available on standard Blu-ray and UHD Blu-ray, the latter also featuring optional HDR for both aspect ratios.

== Track listing ==
All lead vocals by Freddie Mercury unless noted. Since the video is a compilation of two nights, the performance from which a specific song comes from has been noted, with some exceptions.

=== CD ===
Disc one
No.	Title	Writer(s)	Lead vocals	Length
1.	"Intro (Tape)" (24 November)	Queen		1:59
2.	"We Will Rock You (Fast)" (24 & 25 November)	Brian May		3:06
3.	"Let Me Entertain You" (24 November)	Mercury		2:48
4.	"Play the Game" (25 November)	Mercury		3:57
5.	"Somebody to Love" (25 November)	Mercury		7:53
6.	"Killer Queen" (24 November & 25 November)	Mercury		1:59
7.	"I'm in Love with My Car" (24 November)	Roger Taylor	Taylor	2:03
8.	"Get Down, Make Love" (24 & 25 November)	Mercury		4:45
9.	"Save Me" (25 November)	May		4:14
10.	"Now I'm Here" (25 November)	May		5:31
11.	"Dragon Attack" (Unknown)	May		3:11
12.	"Now I'm Here (Reprise)" (Unknown)	May		1:53
13.	"Love of My Life" (24 November)	Mercury		3:56
Total length:				47:15

Disc two
No.	Title	Writer(s)	Length
1.	"Under Pressure" (25 November)	Queen, David Bowie	3:49
2.	"Keep Yourself Alive" (25 November)	May	3:29
3.	"Drum & Tympani Solo" (24 & 25 November)	Taylor	3:00
4.	"Guitar Solo" (24 & 25 November)	May	5:11
5.	"Flash" (25 November)	May	2:11
6.	"The Hero" (25 November)	May	1:51
7.	"Crazy Little Thing Called Love" (24 & 25 November)	Mercury	4:15
8.	"Jailhouse Rock" (24 November)	Jerry Leiber, Mike Stoller	2:32
9.	"Bohemian Rhapsody" (24 November)	Mercury	5:28
10.	"Tie Your Mother Down" (25 November)	May	3:52
11.	"Another One Bites the Dust" (25 November)	John Deacon	4:00
12.	"Sheer Heart Attack" (25 November)	Taylor	3:53
13.	"We Will Rock You" (25 November)	May	2:09
14.	"We Are the Champions" (25 November)	Mercury	3:27
15.	"God Save the Queen" (25 November)	Traditional (arr. May)	1:27
Total length:			50:34

Previously unreleased songs are written in italic, note that they are not available in video format.

=== DVD/Blu-ray ===
Rock Montreal (Video)

Material from both nights has been used in the final version. In a number of instances, the footage is a mixture of camera shots from one night and audio recordings from the other night. A commentary by Roger Taylor and Brian May is an optional feature.

Live Aid (Video)
No.	Title	Writer(s)	Length
1.	"Bohemian Rhapsody"	Mercury
2.	"Radio Ga Ga"	Taylor
3.	"Hammer To Fall"	May
4.	"Crazy Little Thing Called Love"	Mercury
5.	"We Will Rock You"	May
6.	"We Are The Champions"	Mercury
7.	"Is This the World We Created...?"	Mercury, May

All tracks from Live Aid are recorded live at Wembley Stadium, 13 July 1985.

=== Commentary ===
When Queen eventually acquired the rights to the film, Brian May and Roger Taylor recorded a new commentary track, on which they discuss their feelings about the original process of making the concert film. May describes Swimmer's behaviour in trying to get the band to agree to the project in very negative terms. He says the director effectively hounded them and that when they relented, he was not easy to work with during the actual two nights of filming. Unlike Swimmer's earlier commentary track, which paints a generous picture of the relationship between himself and the band, May and Taylor's commentary track indicates very directly that this was not the case. In particular, May was irked by Swimmer's camera direction and raised this point every time he was not in shot during a guitar solo.

== Personnel ==
Queen

- Freddie Mercury – lead vocals, piano, acoustic rhythm guitar on "Crazy Little Thing Called Love", tambourine on "Keep Yourself Alive", backing vocals on "I'm in Love with My Car"
- Brian May – harmony and backing vocals, guitars, piano on "Save Me" and "Flash", synthesizer on "Flash"
- Roger Taylor – harmony and backing vocals, drums, percussion, lead vocals on "I'm in Love with My Car" and "Another One Bites the Dust" (chorus), synthesizer on "Intro"
- John Deacon – backing vocals, bass guitar

Production

- Josh Macrae – mix producer
- Justin Shirley-Smith – mix producer
- Kris Fredriksson – Pro Tools HD
- Reinhold Mack – recording engineer
- Kevin Metcalfe – mastering
- Richard Gray – artwork

== Charts ==
2007–2008 weekly chart performance for Queen Rock Montreal
Chart (2007–2008)	Peak position
Australian Music DVDs (ARIA)	9
Austrian Albums (Ö3 Austria)	25
Belgian Albums (Ultratop Flanders)	84
Belgian Albums (Ultratop Wallonia)	62
Dutch Albums (Album Top 100)	54
French Albums (SNEP)	111
German Albums (Offizielle Top 100)	17
Hungarian Physical Albums (MAHASZ)	24
Irish Albums (IRMA)	88
Italian Albums (FIMI)	27
Mexican Albums (AMPROFON)	73
Portuguese Albums (AFP)	22
Spanish Albums (Promusicae)	35
Swiss Albums (Schweizer Hitparade)	27
UK Albums (Official Charts)	20

2024 weekly chart performance for Queen Rock Montreal
Chart (2024)	Peak position
German Albums (Offizielle Top 100)	6
Japanese Albums (Oricon)	30
Polish Albums (ZPAV)	20
Swiss Albums (Schweizer Hitparade)	13
UK Albums (Official Charts)	31

== Certifications and sales ==
Certifications and sales for Queen Rock Montreal
Region	Certification	Certified units/sales
Argentina (CAPIF)	Platinum	8,000^{^}
Australia (ARIA)	Gold	7,500^{^}
Canada (Music Canada)	2× Platinum	20,000^{^}
Germany (BVMI)	Platinum	50,000^{^}
New Zealand (RMNZ)	Platinum	5,000^{^}
Poland (ZPAV)	Platinum	10,000^{*}
Portugal (AFP)	Platinum	8,000^{^}
Switzerland (IFPI Switzerland)	Gold	3,000^{^}
United Kingdom (BPI)	Platinum	50,000^{*}
United States (RIAA)	Platinum	100,000^{^}
^{*} Sales figures based on certification alone.^{^} Shipments figures based on certification alone.
