= I Hate Myself and Want to Die (book) =

- Author: Tom Reynolds
- Publication date: 2005

I Hate Myself and Want to Die: The 52 Most Depressing Songs You've Ever Heard is a popular book by Tom Reynolds. It was published in 2005. In this book, Reynolds analyses 52 songs and ranks them in order of what he thinks is the most depressing. The three songs at the top of his list are "The Christmas Shoes" by Christian rock band NewSong, Harry Chapin's "The Shortest Story", and Bobby Goldsboro's "Honey"

The book was reviewed in The Sunday Times, NME, Entertainment Weekly and others. The title is a reference to a Nirvana song.

== Reception ==
Frank Valish of Under the Radar praised the book for its "expressive, Edward Gorey-esque illustrations of Stacey Earley" and said it offers "more than one laugh-out-loud moment" and is "engaging". Maclean's reviewer Brian Bethune called the work "savagely comic and cogently argued". Tom Cox, a writer for The Sunday Times, stated that a critique of the book was that "the brief is too broad: it features deliberately miserable songs that are depressing in a good way".
