= Cadac Electronics =

British audio equipment manufacturer

- Founded: 15 September 1968; 58 years ago in London, United Kingdom
- Founders: Clive Green, Adrian Kerridge, David Bott, Charles Billet
- Headquarters: Stourport-on-Severn, Worcestershire, United Kingdom
- Key people: Rob Hughes (UK Sales Manager); Richard Ferriday (Director of Sales and Marketing
- Parent: Soundking Group
- Website: cadac-sound.com

Cadac Holdings Limited are a manufacturer of sound mixing consoles for live music productions, theatres, recording and broadcast. Cadac desks presently are best known for their use in large-scale musicals such as Phantom of the Opera (from 1984 till 2008), The Lion King, Mamma Mia! and We Will Rock You but historically from the late 1960s to the mid-1980s were installed in famous recording studios around the world including Lansdowne Studios, Manor Studios, Wessex Studios, Scorpio Studios and George Harrison's Friar Park Studio. Clive Green retired in 2001. In early 2009 the assets and IP of the company were purchased by Xianggui Wang of the Soundking group, China.

== History ==
In 1967 Clive Green started working with Adrian Kerridge at London's Lansdowne Studios in Holland Park, working on replacing all the valve parts for an old EMI mixing console with solid state technology and modifying the desk for 8-track recording. In 1968, Terry Brown (a sound engineer at Lansdowne and Olympic studios) was asked by Barry Morgan and Monty Bason to set up the new Morgan Studios. Brown asked to buy the designs for the new mixing console that Green and Kerridge had been working on. Green suggested that he build the desk for Brown, and got together with Kerridge, David Bott an engineer from "TVT", and Charles Billet of Audix (who made the frames for the desks). The brand name Cadac came from the combination of their first names (Clive, Adrian, David and Charles). The first Cadac mixing console, an 8-track split console design with no automation and transformer balanced inputs and outputs, was delivered to Morgan Studios, who later purchased and installed additional Cadac desks. Many Cadac desks are still in operation in studios all over the world. The last studio desk to be installed is still at Air Edel Studios in London.

In 1984 a sound engineer, Martin Levan, from Morgan Studios was asked to put on a live show, Little Shop of Horrors, and the first desk was built for live theatre.

Cadac launched a digital audio network called MegaCOMMS, that was designed to work with many many complex applications. It embedded control data in a data stream to avoid losing audio channels. It could carry up to 128 channels of 24-bit, 96 kHz audio, in addition to control data, using two RG6 coaxial cables. It also allowed for phase-aligned clock distribution via embedding markers in the data stream, which in turn allows synchronisation of multiple hardware elements within the network.

Cadac have been used on several theatre productions around the world, including West End performances of Billy Elliot, We Will Rock You, Hairspray, Jersey Boys, Lion King, and Wicked, and Broadway performances of 13, Avenue Q, Chicago, Guys and Dolls, Gypsy, Hairspray, Jersey Boys, Lion King, Mary Poppins, Pal Joey, and South Pacific.

Albums such as Supertramp's Crime of the Century, the Clash's London Calling, the Sex Pistols' Never Mind the Bollocks, Here’s the Sex Pistols, AC/DC's Highway to Hell, and Queen's A Night at the Opera were all, or had tracks, mixed on a Cadac recording console.

In 2009, Cadac was purchased by Xianggui Wang of the Soundking Group Company Limited of Ningbo, China, and Bob Thomas was appointed as the general manager of Cadac Holdings Limited. All of Cadac's employees were retained and Soundking invested $6 million into the company.

In 2011, Cadac appointed David Kan as company CEO and Nick Fletcher as director of research and development. Fletcher had previously been working for Cadac for 20 years, starting as a test engineer before becoming a console design engineer. Kan had previously worked with Cadac's product development engineers. In the same year, Cadac also partnered with the US company LIFT Distribution to help sell its products to American consumers.

In 2014, Rob Hughes was announced to be the company's UK Sales Manager. At this time, the company also announced that it would be making its UK distribution entirely in-house, rather than shipping in supplies from overseas. This was done in an effort to allow for faster project development, and to build stronger relationships with customers in the UK. In the same year, the company also established a US headquarters in the city of Hoboken, New Jersey. The US headquarters was subsequently relocated to Minneapolis, Minnesota.

On 21 October 2015 Richard Ferriday, who has worked for the company since 2013 as a brand development manager, was appointed as Cadac's new director of sales and marketing. He later participated in two sessions at the Live Sound Expo in New York, to help promote the company.

The company's Polish distributor, Tommex, installed an installed a CDC six console in the Miejskie Centrum Kultury in the Polish town of Płońsk, in an effort to help modernise the town's cultural centre. The CDC Six consoles, which are manufactured by the company, sold well across Europe, with the first two shipments selling out. It has also been shipped to Asia. The console was praised for its simplicity and easy to use features.

2020 beam steering loudspeakers were launched under the name of Cadac Technologies.
