= Crazy Tour =

1979 concert tour by Queen

- Local tour by Queen
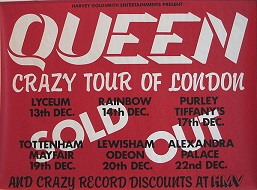
- Promotional poster for the tour's London concerts
- Location: Ireland; United Kingdom
- Start date: 22 November 1979
- End date: 26 December 1979
- Legs: 1
- No. of shows: 20

Queen concert chronology
- Jazz Tour (1978–1979); Crazy Tour (1979); The Game Tour (1980–1981)

The Crazy Tour was the seventh concert tour by the British rock band Queen during November and December 1979.

== Background ==
After the release of the single "Crazy Little Thing Called Love", the band decided to change the concert format they do in the previous tours, as a result, they revisited smaller venues and adopted a new intro tape, consisting of a droning synthesizer leading into the thunder and lightning heard at the end of Dead On Time, from the previous tour. Initially scheduled to end on 22 December after the concert at the Alexandra Palace, the last concert of this tour at the Hammersmith Odeon, was also the first concert of the Concerts for the People of Kampuchea. A bootleg recording of this concert exists as the 2-CD set Crazy Tour of London.

Due to the band choosing to visit many smaller venues during this tour, their lighting rig was scaled down. Additionally, many other changes were made to the band's presentation. Namely, Freddie Mercury decided not to wear suspenders and instead chose to wear a red tie, and either black pants with red kneepads or red pants with blue kneepads. Roger Taylor also adopted a new bass drum head, which was an edited image of his face. It would remain this way through the European Hot Space Tour of 1982. This is the final tour before Freddie grew his trademark moustache in 1980.

This is the first tour where Mercury played guitar on the track "Crazy Little Thing Called Love", in which he play a 12-string Ovation Pacemaker. Brian May would also play piano on this tour for the track "Save Me", after having made his debut on the instrument several months ago on the Japanese leg of the Jazz Tour, with the track "Teo Torriatte". "Liar" was placed on rotation during this tour after a nearly two year absence.

== Tour dates ==
List of 1979 concerts
Date	City	Country	Venue
22 November 1979	Dublin	Ireland	RDS Simmonscourt
24 November 1979	Birmingham	England	National Exhibition Centre
26 November 1979	Manchester	England	Manchester Apollo
27 November 1979	Manchester	England	Manchester Apollo
30 November 1979	Glasgow	Scotland	The Apollo
1 December 1979	Glasgow	Scotland	The Apollo
3 December 1979	Newcastle	England	Newcastle City Hall
4 December 1979	Newcastle	England	Newcastle City Hall
6 December 1979	Liverpool	England	Liverpool Empire Theatre
7 December 1979	Liverpool	England	Liverpool Empire Theatre
9 December 1979	Bristol	England	Bristol Hippodrome
10 December 1979	Brighton	England	Brighton Centre
11 December 1979	Brighton	England	Brighton Centre
13 December 1979	London	England	Lyceum Theatre
14 December 1979	London	England	Rainbow Theatre
17 December 1979	London	England	Purley Tiffany's
19 December 1979	London	England	Tottenham Mayfair
20 December 1979	London	England	Lewisham Odeon
22 December 1979	London	England	Alexandra Palace
26 December 1979	London	England	Hammersmith Odeon

== Personnel ==
- Freddie Mercury: lead vocals, piano, guitar ("Crazy Little Thing Called Love"), tambourine.
- Brian May: guitar, backing vocals, piano.
- Roger Taylor: drums, timpani, lead vocals ("I'm in Love With My Car"), backing vocals.
- John Deacon: bass guitar, additional backing vocals
