= Spread Your Wings =

- UK single picture sleeve

Single by Queen

from the album News of the World
- B-side: "Sheer Heart Attack"
- Released: 10 February 1978
- Recorded: 1977
- Studio: Sarm West and Wessex, in London
- Genre: Hard rock
- Length: 4:32
- Label: EMI (UK)
- Songwriter: John Deacon
- Producers: Queen, assisted by Mike Stone

Queen singles chronology
"We Are the Champions" and "We Will Rock You" (1977)	"Spread Your Wings" (1978)	"It's Late" (1978)

Music video
- "Spread Your Wings" on YouTube

"Spread Your Wings" is a song by the British rock band Queen from their 1977 album News of the World. Written by bassist John Deacon, it was released as a single in 1978, with "Sheer Heart Attack" as the B-side, and reached number 34 on the UK singles chart. According to music writer Benoit Clerc, "Spread Your Wings" was chosen as the second single from News of the World because the band regretted releasing "Tie Your Mother Down" as a single from A Day at the Races instead of Deacon's "You and I".

== Background ==
The lyrics of "Spread Your Wings" tells of a character named Sammy, who works cleaning floors at a bar but dreams of improving his life despite his boss telling him that he has no ambition. Deacon has said:

The song has to do with a number of personal experiences from recent years. I'd rather not say in detail, because I don't like to explain songs. People should figure it out for themselves, I think...It's not always easy, let me tell you. You deal with a lot of things that are not always pleasant. Of course, money is wonderful, but I don't need to be very rich. I just don't want to fall back into a state of poverty, which a number of fairly famous musicians have ended up in. I want to try to keep something for the future.

Queen FAQ author Daniel Ross described "Spread Your Wings" as Deacon's "first attempt at narrative songwriting." Lead singer Freddie Mercury considered it to be the best song Deacon had written to date.

Musicologist Nick Braae describes the structure of "Spread Your Wings" as being somewhat unusual, in that after the initial verse and refrain centered on the key of D major, there is a bridge centered on the key of B minor, followed by an instrumental bridge that starts moving back to D major for the next verse-refrain pair. Deacon used this double-bridge strategy in several other songs, including "You and I" and "Need Your Loving Tonight".

The song is unusual for Queen in that it uses a third-person narrative. It is also the only Queen single that does not have the rest of the group providing backing vocals to Mercury's lead.

"Spread Your Wings" was not released as a single in North America, but the live version of the song from Live Killers was chosen as the B-side of Queen's 1979 hit "Crazy Little Thing Called Love", which reached number one on the US Billboard Hot 100.

== Reception ==
Dayton Daily News critic Gary Nuhn called it "a song with Beatles-like lyrics of a man pulling himself up". Courier News critic Bill Bleyer wrote that it makes a similar point as the more popular song "We Are the Champions", that "while the established order continues to hold down the young, they can still make it if they try". He added that it does so better and "without overpowering the listener". Ross described it as a "melancholy anthem" that has "the same sense of bombast as 'We Are the Champions' but shot through with existential sadness and a desire to burst the shackles of mundane employment."

Clerc praised Mercury's vocal delivery, saying that he sang the song "superbly, emphasizing the lyrics with his compelling vocal dexterity". Andrew Wild said that it's a "commercial song with a terrific chorus" and is "sung with real conviction by Freddie Mercury".

Ultimate Classic Rock critic Eduardo Rivadavia rated the song as the fourth-best song Deacon wrote for Queen, praising its "rising appreciation of musical drama". Classic Rock History critic Millie Zeiler rated it John Deacon's fourth-best Queen song.

== Music video ==
The music video for "Spread Your Wings" was shot in January 1978 in the garden of Roger Taylor's house in Surrey, on the same day the band also shot the video for "We Will Rock You". The video was directed by Rock Flicks.

== Personnel ==
- Freddie Mercury – lead vocals, piano
- Brian May – electric guitar
- Roger Taylor – drums, percussion
- John Deacon – bass guitar, acoustic guitar

== Charts ==
Chart (1978)	Peak position
Germany (GfK)	29
Netherlands (Dutch Top 40)	20
Netherlands (Single Top 100)	26
UK Singles (Official Charts)	34

== Cover versions ==
This song was covered by German power metal band Blind Guardian on their 1992 album Somewhere Far Beyond. The same recording reappeared on their 1996 album The Forgotten Tales.
