= Sheer Heart Attack (song) =

- Back side of the US vinyl for the "It's Late" single release

Song by Queen

from the album News of the World
- A-side: "Spread Your Wings" (Europe); "It's Late"; (US)
- Released: 10 February 1978 (Europe); 25 April 1978 (US)
- Recorded: July – September 1977
- Studio: Basing Street, London; Wessex, London
- Genre: Hard rock; heavy metal; punk rock
- Length: 3:27
- Label: EMI, Parlophone (Europe); Elektra, Hollywood (US)
- Songwriter: Roger Taylor
- Producers: Queen; Mike Stone

Music video
- "Sheer Heart Attack" on YouTube

"Sheer Heart Attack" is a song by the British rock band Queen, released on their sixth studio album News of the World in 1977. It is one of two songs on the album entirely written by Roger Taylor, the other being "Fight from the Inside". The song contains a music video made in 1997 for the Queen Rocks compilation album.

== Background ==
"Sheer Heart Attack" was originally written as the title track for the album of the same name in 1974, but was not included. It was finished for News of the World in 1977, and is characterized by its fast, even tempo throughout its length, with the raw simplicity and including an abrupt ending.

Roger Taylor sang lead vocals and backing vocals. Freddie Mercury also sang lead and backing vocals. Taylor plays almost every instrument on the finished track, with some help from Brian May on lead guitar and "screams". This is one of the few original Queen recordings that does not feature bass guitarist John Deacon.

The song was the B-side of the Deacon-penned single "Spread Your Wings" in February 1978. It was also the B-side of the single "It's Late", written by May, which was released only in Canada, the United States, New Zealand and Japan in April 1978.

== Live performances ==
The song was performed live from 1977 to 1984. It has been released on three live albums: Live Killers in 1979, Queen Rock Montreal in 1981, and Queen on Fire – Live at the Bowl in 1982.

== Personnel ==
Information is based on the album's liner notes

- Roger Taylor – lead and backing vocals, drums, rhythm guitar, bass guitar
- Freddie Mercury – lead and backing vocals
- Brian May – lead guitar
