= Tom Reynolds (author) =

American author and television producer

Tom Reynolds (born 1960 in Wisconsin) is an American author and television producer. He wrote I Hate Myself and Want to Die and Touch Me, I'm Sick. He also wrote Wild Ride: How Outlaw Motorcycle Myth Conquered America. This book was based on his 1999 documentary. He currently lives in Nacogdoches, Texas, where he teaches Speech and English at Stephen F. Austin State University.

== Books ==
He wrote I Hate Myself and Want to Die and Touch Me, I'm Sick. He also wrote Wild ride: how outlaw motorcycle myth conquered America.

== Television ==
In 1996, he transitioned into television, writing and producing over 90 hours of TV programming, including documentaries and non-fiction specials for A&E, Dick Wolf Productions, Travel Channel, E! Entertainment, and Warner Brothers Television. He produced several television programs including documentaries including The Wild Ride of Outlaw Bikers (1999). He was also a writer on Illuminating Angels & Demons (2005).
