= Montreal Forum =

Entertainment complex in Quebec, Canada

Coordinates: 45°29′25″N 73°35′5″W

Montreal Forum Forum de Montréal (French)
- Le Temple du hockey, Le Forum, L'Aréna de la rue Ste-Catherine (French); The Temple of Hockey, The Forum, The Arena on Saint-Catherine Street
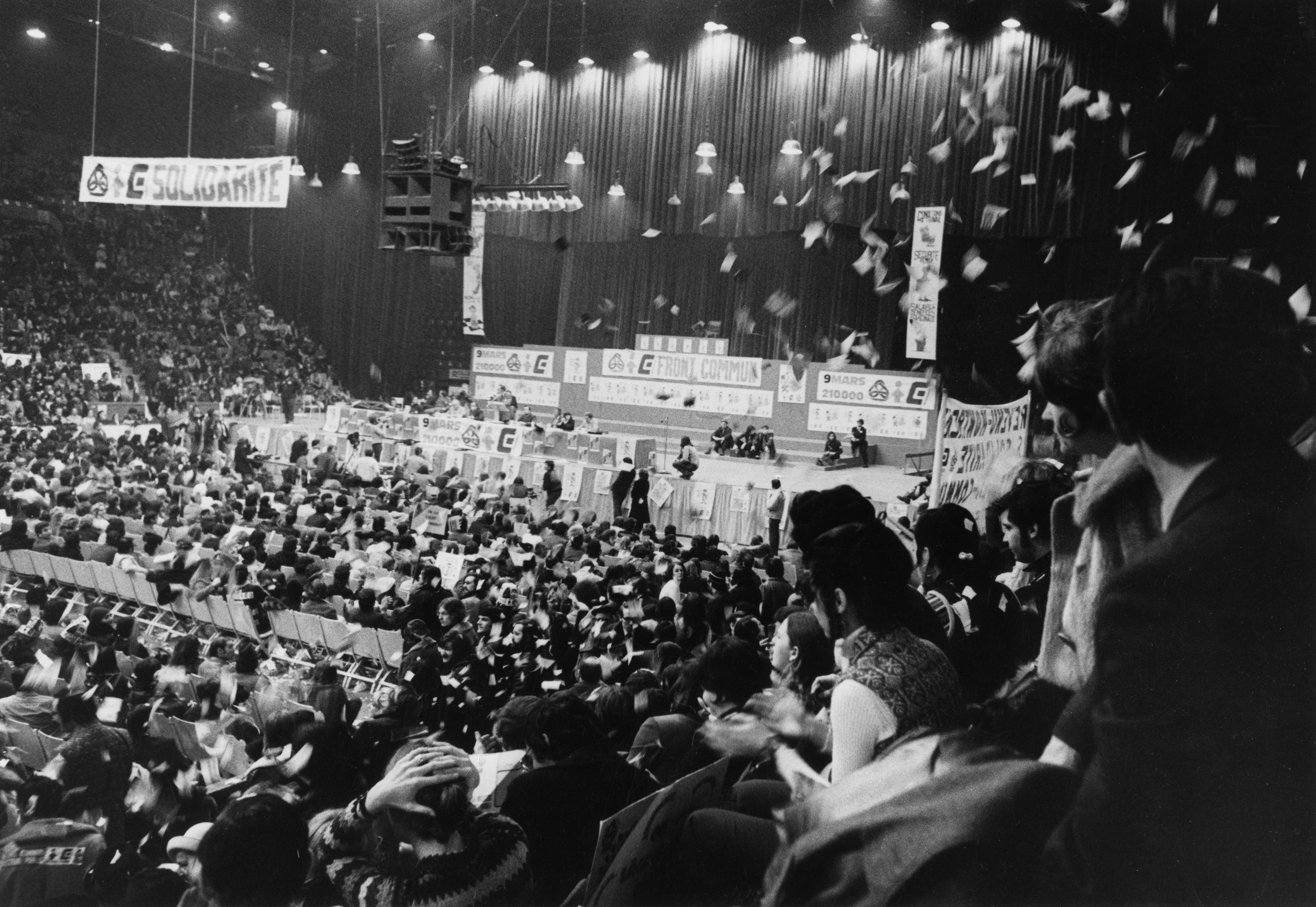
- Interior of the arena (political event) (1972)
- Interactive map of Montreal Forum; Forum de Montréal (French)
- Address: 2313 Sainte-Catherine Street West
- Location: Montreal, Quebec
- Capacity: Ice hockey: 17,959; Basketball: 18,575

Construction
- Groundbreaking: June 24, 1924
- Opened: November 29, 1924
- Renovated: 1998 (interior only; exterior still stands)
- Expanded: 1949, 1968
- Closed: March 11, 1996
- Cost: C$1.5 million ($27.4 million in 2025 dollars)
- Architects: John Smith Archibald (1924); Stone & Webster (1968)
- General contractor: Atlas Construction Company

Tenants
- Montreal Maroons (NHL) (1924–38); Montreal Canadiens (NHL) (1926–96); Montreal Junior Canadiens (QJHL) (1933–61); Montreal Junior Canadiens (OHA) (1961–72); Montreal Voyageurs (AHL) (1969–71); Montreal Bleu Blanc Rouge (QMJHL) (1972–75); Montreal Juniors (QMJHL) (1975–82); Montreal Manic (NASL Indoor) (1981–82); Montreal Roadrunners (RHI) (1994–95)

National Historic Site of Canada
- Designated: 1997

Montreal Forum (French: Forum de Montréal) is a historic building located facing Cabot Square in Montreal, Quebec, Canada. Called "the most storied building in hockey history" by Sporting News, it was an indoor arena which served as the home of the National Hockey League's Montreal Maroons from 1924 to 1938 and the Montreal Canadiens from 1926 to 1996. The Forum was built by the Canadian Arena Company in 159 days. Today, most of the Forum building is now a multiplex cinema known as Cineplex Cinemas Forum operated by Cineplex Entertainment. Additionally, a large portion of the building's upper floors are used as campus expansion for Dawson College.

Located at the northeast corner of Atwater and Ste-Catherine West (Metro Atwater), the building was historically significant as 15 Stanley Cup championships were clinched/presented on its ice: twelve for the Canadiens and one for the Maroons (for whom the arena was built initially); one each for the New York Rangers and Calgary Flames. The Forum was also home to the Montreal Roadrunners and Montreal Junior Canadiens.

== History ==
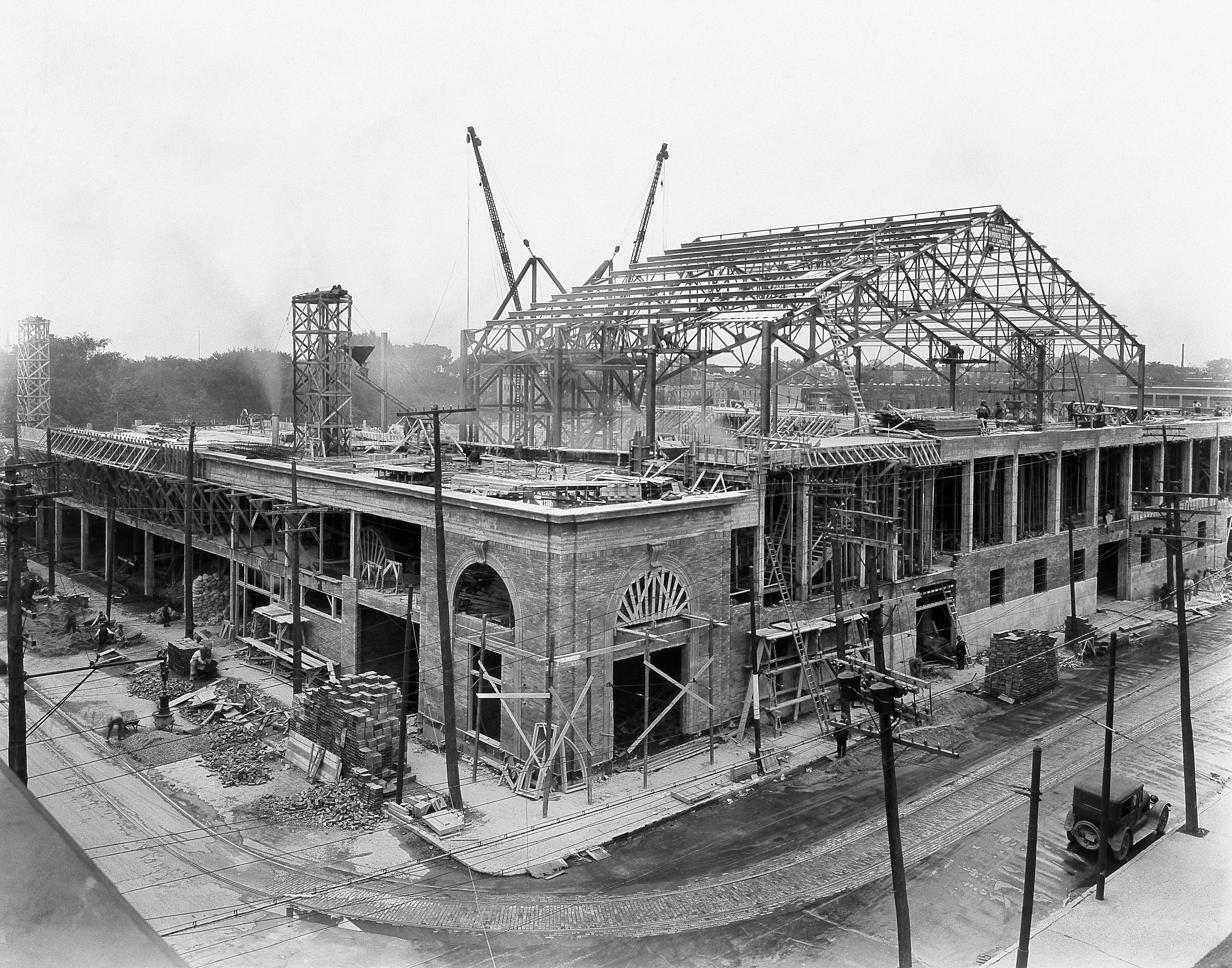
The Montreal Forum under construction in 1924

The idea to build the Forum in 1923 is credited to Sir Edward Wentworth Beatty, president of the Canadian Pacific Railway. At the suggestion of Senator Donat Raymond, William Northey developed a plan for a 12,500-seat capacity rink. Plans were scaled back for financial reasons to a rink of 9,300 seats. Even at the reduced size, the rink could not immediately find financing. The Forum would eventually be financed by H. L. Timmins. The site selected was the site of a roller skating rink named the Forum, and the name was kept. The site had previously been the site of an outdoor ice hockey rink, used by Frank and Lester Patrick, Art Ross and Russell Bowie as youths.

The Forum opened on November 29, 1924, at a total cost of C$1.5 million ($27.4 million in 2025 dollars) with an original seating capacity of 9,300. It underwent two renovations, in 1949 and 1968. When the Forum closed in 1996 it had a capacity of 17,959, which included approximately 1,600 in standing room.

In 1968, the arena was given a major renovation and redesign. The work was carried out by engineering firm Stone & Webster Canada Limited, whose chief architect was Kenneth Sedleigh (né Kazimierz Siedlecki; 1915–2005). The Montreal firm David & Boulva served as consulting architects. As part of the 1968 renovations, a centre-hanging digital score clock was installed, designed by the Day Sign Company of Toronto and similar to those installed at the Boston Garden and Chicago Stadium during the 1970s. A new centre-hanging score clock, designed by Daktronics, was installed in 1985 and contained on each side a colour matrix board.

Along with one other Original Six indoor ice hockey arena, the Boston Garden, the Montreal Forum used a high-pitched siren to signal the end of an NHL game's period. The siren would later be re-installed in the Forum's successor facility, the Bell Centre (and is still in use there), much as the TD Garden in Boston inherited the lower-pitched Garden's siren.

=== Ice hockey ===
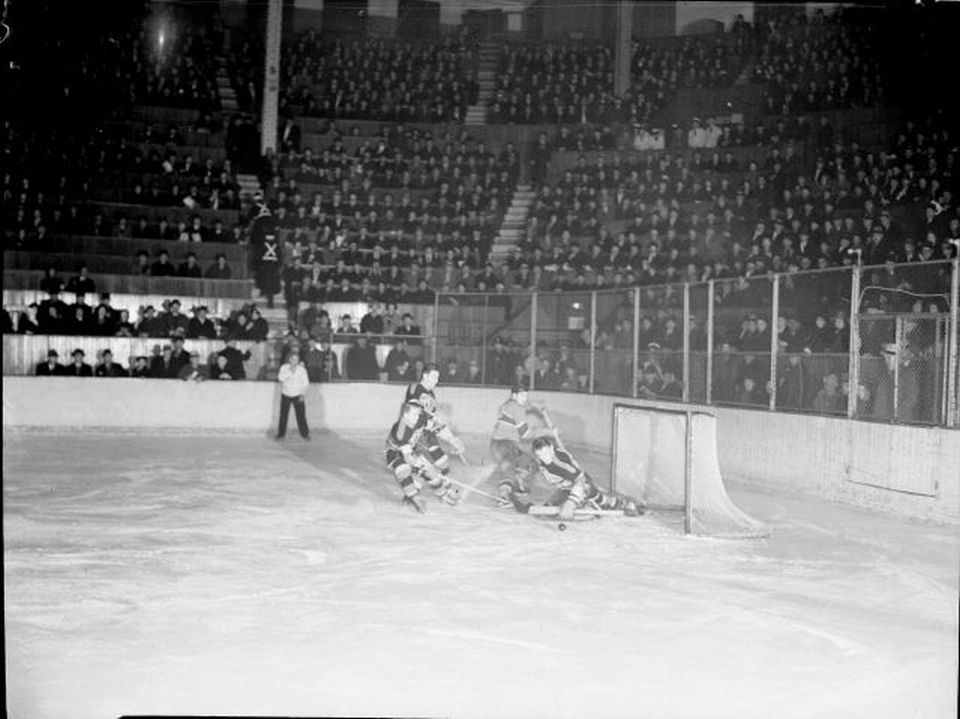
Canadiens vs. Chicago Blackhawks at the Forum

While hosting the Canadiens and Maroons on Thursdays and Saturdays, the Forum also hosted the Quebec Senior Hockey League, featuring the Montreal Victorias, Montreal Royals and the Montreal Canadiens amateur team on Wednesdays and Sundays. The Quebec Junior Hockey League played on Monday nights, the Bank League on Tuesdays, and the Railways and Telephone League played on Friday nights.

The Montreal Forum hosted Memorial Cup games in 1950, 1968, 1969, 1970, 1973 & 1976, with the Junior Canadiens winning on home ice in 1970. In 1972, the Forum hosted game one of the famous "Summit Series" between Team Canada and the USSR; the USSR won the game 7-3. The 1980 NHL entry draft was hosted at the Forum. It would mark the first time that an NHL Arena hosted the event.

The Forum hosted the Stanley Cup Final in 1926, 1928, 1930, 1931, 1944, 1946, 1947, 1951, 1952, 1953, 1954, 1955, 1956, 1957, 1958, 1959, 1960, 1965, 1966, 1967, 1968, 1969, 1971, 1973, 1976, 1977, 1978, 1979, 1986, 1989, and 1993.

Only two visiting teams have won the Stanley Cup on Forum ice. The New York Rangers accomplished this in 1928 against the Maroons and the Calgary Flames defeated the Canadiens in 1989.

On March 11, 1996, the Montreal Canadiens played their last game at the Montreal Forum, defeating the Dallas Stars 4-1. The game was televised on TSN and TQS in Canada and on ESPN2 in the United States. The Stars' Guy Carbonneau, who had captained the Canadiens from 1989 to 1994 (including their 1993 Cup win), took the ceremonial opening faceoff. After the game, many previous hockey greats were presented to the crowd, most notably Maurice Richard (said to be the Canadiens' most beloved player of all time), who received a sixteen-minute standing ovation from the crowd as he broke down in tears. A symbolic torch—representative of a line quoted from the poem In Flanders Fields, "To you from failing hands we throw the torch; be yours to hold it high," displayed in the Forum's home dressing room—was carried by Émile Bouchard out of the Canadiens dressing room to the playing surface. The flaming torch was passed on to all seven of living former Canadiens captains (Jean Beliveau, Yvan Cournoyer, Henri Richard, Serge Savard, Bob Gainey, and Carbonneau) and finally to the then-current captain Pierre Turgeon. The next day, a parade was organized in which the torch was carried down the route to the Molson Centre (which has since been renamed the Bell Centre). Their first game at the new venue was against the New York Rangers, which the Canadiens won.

=== Other sports ===
When the 1932 World Figure Skating Championships were held in Montreal, the first occasion of their taking place in Canada, the Forum was used as the venue for the free skating competitions.

The Forum also hosted other sports, including indoor soccer, boxing, lacrosse and tennis. It was a site of five events in the 1976 Summer Olympics: gymnastics, handball (final), basketball (final), volleyball (final), and boxing (final). The gymnastics event included Nadia Comaneci's famous perfect 10, the first in Olympic history.

The Forum was the site of many major professional wrestling matches, as shown in the 1961 National Film Board of Canada documentary Wrestling (La Lutte).

=== Notable events ===
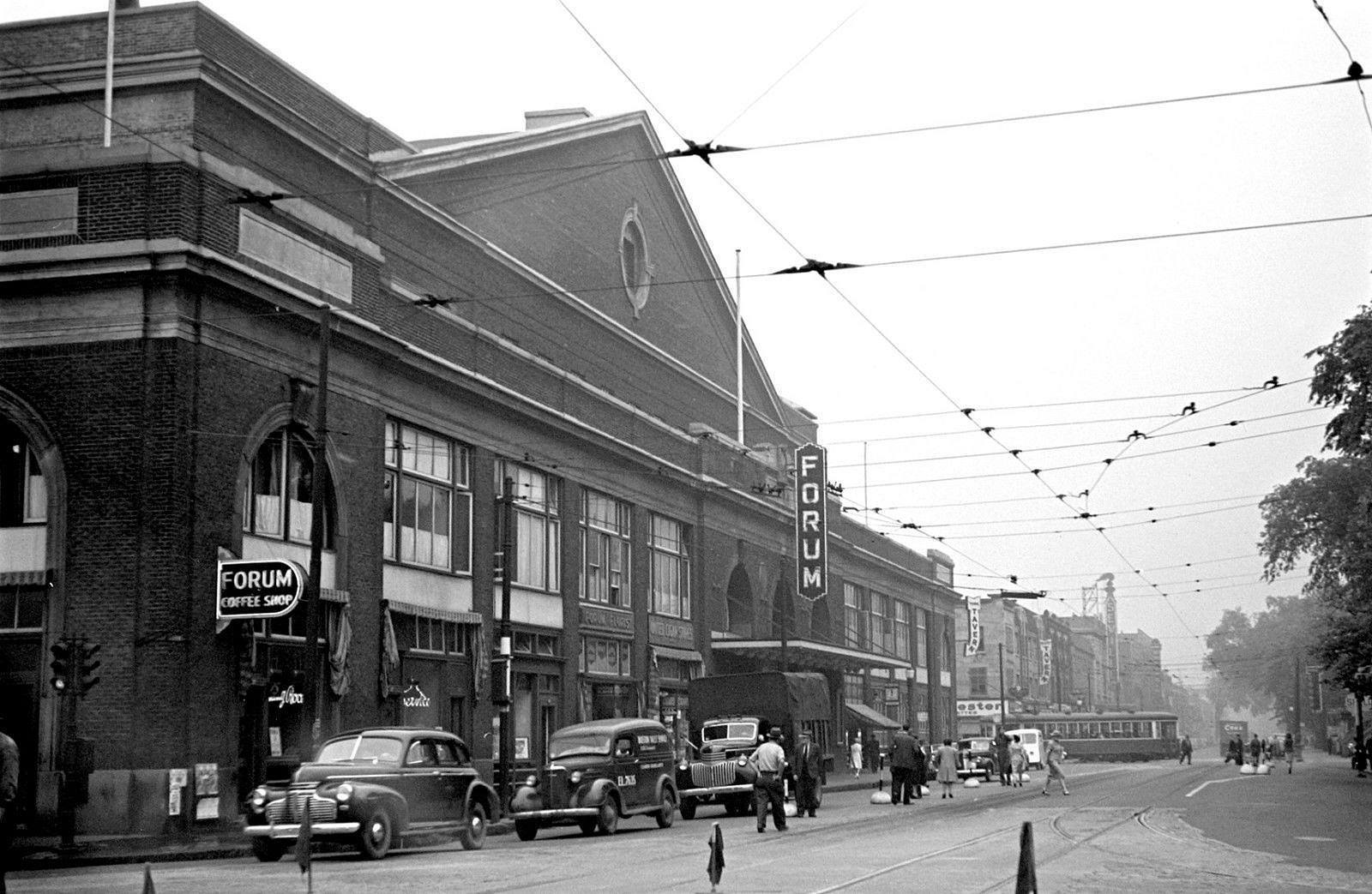
Forum de Montreal 1945

On March 11, 1937, the Forum hosted the only funeral in its history, a service for Canadiens great Howie Morenz. Morenz had died from complications due to a broken leg sustained in a game between the Canadiens and the Chicago Blackhawks on January 28.

On September 8, 1964, The Beatles performed at the Forum. Four tracks, including a live version of "A Hard Rain's a-Gonna Fall" for The Bootleg Series Vol. 5: Bob Dylan Live 1975, The Rolling Thunder Revue were recorded here. Diana Ross & the Supremes performed one of their last concerts together here on October 2, 1969. Bob Marley and the Wailers played here on June 10, 1978, to support his Kaya Tour. The Bee Gees played two sold-out concerts here on September 1–2, 1979, during their North American Spirits Having Flown Tour. The first four tracks off the Journey live album Captured were recorded at The Forum on August 8, 1980. In 1981, Canadian rock band Rush filmed (and recorded almost all of) their 1981 concert film and album, Exit...Stage Left. That same year, British rock band Queen recorded and filmed their concert film, titled We Will Rock You (re-released as Queen Rock Montreal in 2007). This had followed earlier performances by the band in 1977 for the A Day At The Races Tour, 1978 for the Jazz Tour, 1980 for the first leg of The Game Tour, and finally in 1982 for the Hot Space Tour. On August 4, 1981, the Jacksons performed at the Forum during their Triumph Tour. In March 1983, American musical duo Hall & Oates filmed and recorded their concert film, Rock 'n Soul Live. The live portions of Black Sabbath's video for the song "Zero the Hero" were filmed in 1983. In 1987, Madonna with her Who's That Girl World Tour played the Montreal Forum for two sold-out concerts on July 6-7. In July 1983, David Bowie held a concert for his Serious Moonlight Tour to promote his new album Let's Dance. As part of her debut headlining tour, The Greatest Love World Tour, Whitney Houston performed a concert on August 6, 1986.

The heavy metal band Metallica performed two half-priced shows at the Montreal Forum in February 1993 after the events of August 1992.

Billy Graham held his Mission Quebec in 1990 before nearly 20,000 spectators, which was filmed for international television syndication as a TV special. Then Canadien Ryan Walter delivered his testimony at the crusade.

=== Seating capacity ===
Seats	Standing room	Total	Period
9,300	3,200	12,500	1924–1949
13,551	2,000	15,551	1949–1968
16,500	2,500	19,000	1968–1978
16,074	2,002	18,076	1978–1991
16,259	1,700	17,959	1991–1996

== After hockey ==
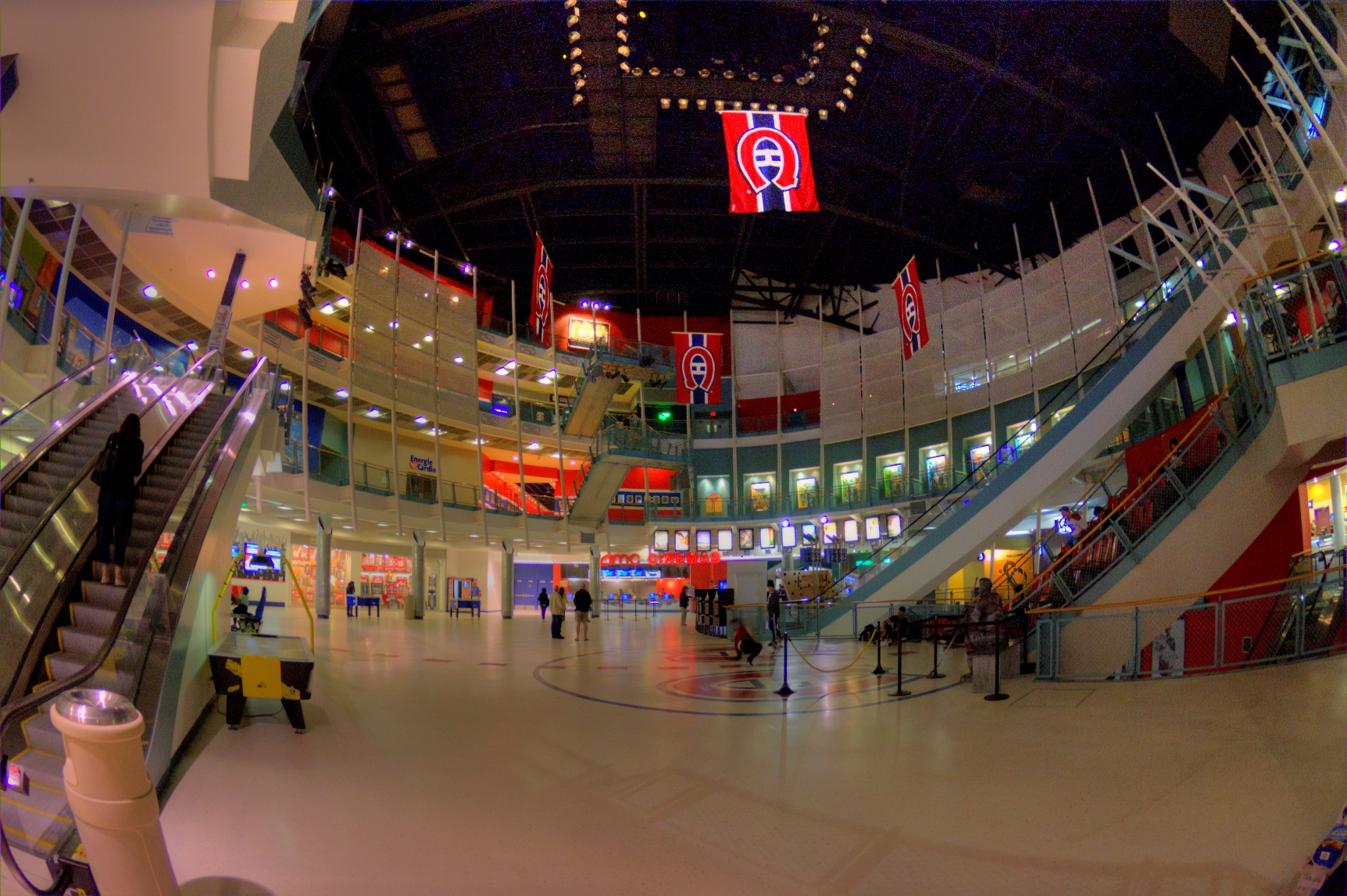
Montreal Forum interior (in 2012)

After the Canadiens left the Forum, the building was used to film arena sequences for the Brian De Palma film Snake Eyes.

The Forum was then completely gutted and converted into a downtown entertainment centre called the Pepsi Forum, consisting of an AMC Theatres multiplex theatre (sold to Cineplex Odeon in July 2012), shops and restaurants. A Rainforest Cafe was planned to open at the location following its conversion but was never built.

Centre ice was recreated in the centre of the complex, complete with a small section of the grandstand, along with a statue of a fan leaning forward in delight (removed in the summer of 2017), while original seats were used as benches throughout the complex. A statue of Maurice Richard was located next to the grandstand. On the Saint Catherine Street entrance, there is a Quebec Walk of Fame consisting of Richard and Celine Dion. Both were on hand for their bronze star's respective unveiling. The Atwater Street entrance has a large bronze Montreal Canadiens logo surrounded by 24 bronze Stanley Cup banners cemented into the sidewalk. Inscribed in French are the words "forever proud." The entire building was themed after the Forum's storied history, with particular emphasis on the Montreal Canadiens.

The building was declared a National Historic Site of Canada in 1997 because:

"it was arguably the country's most famous sporting venue... it also serves as an icon for the role of hockey in Canada's national culture... the Forum is the oldest of Canada's large-scale arenas and has, throughout its history, been the country's leading site for major indoor cultural, political and religious events."

— Historic Sites and Monuments Board of Canada, Minutes, June 1997

The city of Montreal estimated the value of the building at $36.8 million in 2012. This is a $10 million drop in value since the previous estimation in 2009. AMC Forum is now owned by New York City-based real estate investor Ben Ashkenazy through a firm called Investissements Forum Canadien Inc. Due to economic downturn in recent years, the Montreal Forum has suffered from many vacant and empty spaces. To supplement the building's revenue, Dawson College has leased out a large section of its 2nd and 4th floors to expand its adjustment campus. Furthermore, extensive renovations were done to refresh the space to give it a more generic mall look, which meant the removal of tributes to hockey and its themes (including the re-creation of centre ice, stands, seating, hockey banners and statues). Some of the Forum and hockey memorabilia can still be found on the upper levels, albeit in a far less prominent and visible way. The building now features a bowling alley, arcade, and comedy club on its upper levels, as well.

Events and tenants
Preceded by Mount Royal Arena	Home of the Montreal Canadiens; 1926–1996	Succeeded by Bell Centre
Preceded by First arena	Home of the Montreal Maroons; 1924–1938	Succeeded by Final arena
Preceded by Detroit Olympia; Detroit Olympia; Maple Leaf Gardens; Maple Leaf Gardens; Chicago Stadium; Spectrum	Host of the NHL All-Star Game; 1953; 1956-1960; 1965-1967; 1969; 1975; 1993	Succeeded by Detroit Olympia; Chicago Stadium; Maple Leaf Gardens; St. Louis Arena; Spectrum; Madison Square Garden
