= Jazz Tour =

1978–1979 concert tour by Queen

- World tour by Queen
- Advertisement for the concert in UnionDale
- Location: Europe; Japan; North America
- Associated album: Jazz
- Start date: 28 October 1978
- End date: 6 May 1979
- Legs: 3
- No. of shows: 35 in North America; 28 in Europe; 15 in Asia; 78 in total

Queen concert chronology
- News of the World Tour (1977–1978); Jazz Tour (1978–1979); Crazy Tour (1979)

The Jazz Tour was the sixth headlining concert tour by the British rock band Queen, supporting the album Jazz. The tour was memorable for the spectacle created by the band. As James Henke of Rolling Stone said about the band's Halloween 1978 concert in New Orleans: "...when they were launching a U.S. tour in support of their Jazz, album, Queen threw a bash in New Orleans that featured snake charmers, strippers, crossdressers and a naked fat lady who smoked cigarettes in her crotch." Part of the European leg was recorded for the band's first live album, Live Killers.

== Background ==
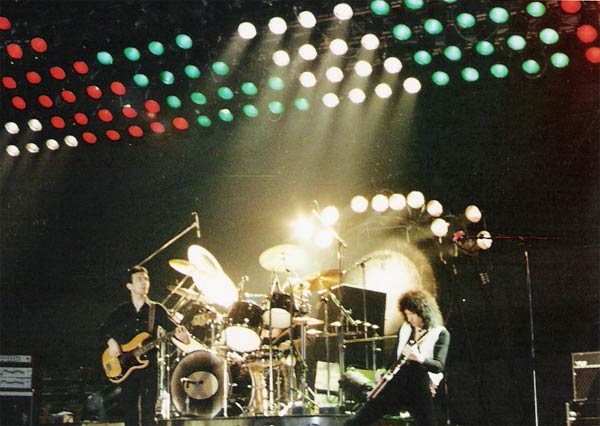
Queen performing at the January 23, 1979 concert at Hanover

Due to the tour starting within weeks of the final recording sessions for Jazz, Freddie Mercury's voice was worn out, which led to generally below-average performances. While holding up fine for the American and European shows, he lost his voice in Japan. During the encore performance of "We Will Rock You", as he sang, Mercury would be carried on the shoulders of a Superman cosplayer.

== Tour dates ==
List of 1978 concerts
Date	City	Country	Venue
28 October 1978	Dallas	United States	Dallas Convention Center
29 October 1978	Memphis	United States	Mid-South Coliseum
31 October 1978	New Orleans	United States	New Orleans Municipal Auditorium
3 November 1978	Hollywood	United States	Hollywood Sportatorium
4 November 1978	Lakeland	United States	Lakeland Civic Center
6 November 1978	Landover	United States	Capital Centre
7 November 1978	New Haven	United States	New Haven Coliseum
9 November 1978	Detroit	United States	Cobo Hall
10 November 1978	Detroit	United States	Cobo Hall
11 November 1978	Kalamazoo	United States	Wings Stadium
13 November 1978	Boston	United States	Boston Garden
14 November 1978	Providence	United States	Providence Civic Center
16 November 1978	New York City	United States	Madison Square Garden
17 November 1978	New York City	United States	Madison Square Garden
19 November 1978	Uniondale	United States	Nassau Coliseum
20 November 1978	Philadelphia	United States	The Spectrum
22 November 1978	Nashville	United States	Nashville Municipal Auditorium
23 November 1978	St. Louis	United States	Checkerdome
25 November 1978	Richfield	United States	Richfield Coliseum
26 November 1978	Cincinnati	United States	Riverfront Coliseum
28 November 1978	Buffalo	United States	Buffalo Memorial Auditorium
30 November 1978	Ottawa	Canada	Ottawa Civic Centre
1 December 1978	Montreal	Canada	Montreal Forum
3 December 1978	Toronto	Canada	Maple Leaf Gardens
4 December 1978	Toronto	Canada	Maple Leaf Gardens
6 December 1978	Madison	United States	Dane County Coliseum
7 December 1978	Chicago	United States	Chicago Stadium
8 December 1978	Kansas City	United States	Kemper Arena
12 December 1978	Seattle	United States	Seattle Center Coliseum
13 December 1978	Portland	United States	Memorial Coliseum
14 December 1978	Vancouver	Canada	Pacific Coliseum
16 December 1978	Oakland	United States	Oakland–Alameda County Coliseum Arena
18 December 1978	Inglewood	United States	The Forum
19 December 1978	Inglewood	United States	The Forum
20 December 1978	Inglewood	United States	The Forum

List of 1979 concerts
Date	City	Country	Venue
17 January 1979	Hamburg	West Germany	Ernst-Merck-Halle
18 January 1979	Kiel	West Germany	Ostseehalle
20 January 1979	Bremen	West Germany	Stadthalle Bremen
21 January 1979	Dortmund	West Germany	Westfalenhallen
23 January 1979	Hanover	West Germany	Messesportpalast
24 January 1979	West Berlin	West Germany	Deutschlandhalle
26 January 1979	Brussels	Belgium	Forest National
27 January 1979	Brussels	Belgium	Forest National
29 January 1979	Rotterdam	Netherlands	Rotterdam Ahoy
30 January 1979	Rotterdam	Netherlands	Rotterdam Ahoy
1 February 1979	Cologne	West Germany	Cologne Sporthalle
2 February 1979	Frankfurt	West Germany	Festhalle Frankfurt
4 February 1979	Zürich	Switzerland	Hallenstadion
6 February 1979	Zagreb	Yugoslavia	Dom Sportova
7 February 1979	Ljubljana	Yugoslavia	Tivoli Hall
10 February 1979	Munich	West Germany	Rudi-Sedlmayer-Halle
11 February 1979	Munich	West Germany	Rudi-Sedlmayer-Halle
13 February 1979	Böblingen	West Germany	Böblingen Sporthalle
15 February 1979	Saarbrücken	West Germany	Saarlandhalle
17 February 1979	Lyon	France	Palais des Sports de Gerland
19 February 1979	Barcelona	Spain	Palau dels Esports de Barcelona
20 February 1979	Barcelona	Spain	Palau dels Esports de Barcelona
22 February 1979	Madrid	Spain	Palacio de Deportes de la Comunidad de Madrid
23 February 1979	Madrid	Spain	Palacio de Deportes de la Comunidad de Madrid
25 February 1979	Poitiers	France	Arènes de Poitiers
27 February 1979	Paris	France	Pavillon de Paris
28 February 1979	Paris	France	Pavillon de Paris
1 March 1979	Paris	France	Pavillon de Paris
13 April 1979	Tokyo	Japan	Nippon Budokan
14 April 1979	Tokyo	Japan	Nippon Budokan
19 April 1979	Osaka	Japan	Osaka Festival Hall
20 April 1979	Osaka	Japan	Osaka Festival Hall
21 April 1979	Kanazawa	Japan	Jissenrinri Kinen Commemor. Hall
23 April 1979	Tokyo	Japan	Nippon Budokan
24 April 1979	Tokyo	Japan	Nippon Budokan
25 April 1979	Tokyo	Japan	Nippon Budokan
27 April 1979	Kobe	Japan	Kobe Central Gymnasium
28 April 1979	Nagoya	Japan	Portmesse Nagoya
30 April 1979	Fukuoka	Japan	Fukuoka Kyuden Kinen Gymnasium
1 May 1979	Fukuoka	Japan	Fukuoka Kyuden Kinen Gymnasium
2 May 1979	Yamaguchi	Japan	Yamaguchi Prefectural Athletic Association
5 May 1979	Sapporo	Japan	Makomanai Ice Arena
6 May 1979	Sapporo	Japan	Makomanai Ice Arena

=== Box office score data ===
List of box office score data with date, city, venue, attendance, gross, references
Date (1978)	City	Venue	Attendance	Gross	Ref(s)
29 October	Memphis, United States	Mid-South Coliseum	9,245 / 9,245	$73,401	
31 October	New Orleans, United States	Municipal Auditorium	8,000 / 8,000	$68,000	
7 November	New Haven, United States	New Haven Coliseum	10,567 / 10,567	$84,927	
9 November	Detroit, United States	Cobo Arena	22,650 / 22,650	$227,833	
10 November	Detroit, United States	Cobo Arena	22,650 / 22,650	$227,833	
20 November	Philadelphia, United States	Spectrum	14,700	$115,100	
22 November	Nashville, United States	Nashville Municipal Auditorium	9,193	$68,774	
23 November	St. Louis, United States	Checkerdome	11,422	$94,342	
6 December	Madison, United States	Dane County Coliseum	7,544	$61,667	
8 December	Kansas City, United States	Kemper Arena	13,687	$107,540	
12 December	Seattle, United States	Seattle Center Coliseum	11,014	$83,406	
13 December	Portland, United States	Memorial Coliseum	10,333	$83,291	
14 December	Vancouver, Canada	Pacific Coliseum	15,428	$123,425	
16 December	Oakland, United States	Oakland–Alameda County Coliseum Arena	12,285 / 12,285	$96,317	

== Personnel ==
- Freddie Mercury: lead vocals, piano, tambourine.
- Brian May: guitars, backing vocals, piano ("Teo Torriatte")
- Roger Taylor: drums, timpani, lead vocals ("I'm in Love With My Car"), backing vocals.
- John Deacon: bass guitar, additional backing vocals, triangle
