= A Day at the Races Tour =

1977 concert tour by Queen

- World tour by Queen
- Poster to the concert in Frankfurt
- Location: Europe; North America
- Associated album: A Day at the Races
- Start date: 13 January 1977
- End date: 7 June 1977
- Legs: 2
- No. of shows: 40 in North America; 19 in Europe; 59 in total

Queen concert chronology
- Summer Gigs (1976); A Day at the Races Tour (1977); News of the World Tour (1977–1978)

The A Day at the Races Tour (also known as the World Tour '77, Summer Tour 1977 and the Jubilee Tour) was the fourth headlining concert tour by the British rock band Queen, supporting their late 1976 album A Day at the Races.

== Background ==
This tour was the first in which the band played "Somebody to Love" and many others. "Brighton Rock" and "Bohemian Rhapsody" were performed full-length for the first time. Also, singer Freddie Mercury performed a vocal canon between "White Man" and "The Prophet's Song".

"When people started singing along, we found it kind of annoying..." recalled Brian May. "Then there was an enormous realisation, at Bingley Hall in the Midlands. They sang every note of every song. Freddie and I looked at each other and went, 'Something's happening here. We've been fighting it, and we should be embracing it.' That's where 'We Will Rock You' and 'We Are the Champions' came from. It was an epoch-making moment."

The opening act for most of the North American concerts was Thin Lizzy. In New York City, the concert at Madison Square Garden sold out within moments of tickets going on sale.

The final two shows at the Earls Court Exhibition Centre were recorded, with the band using an expensive lighting rig in the shape of a crown for the first time. Both shows were also professionally recorded on video and the first can be found on many bootlegs. Of one such release – Top Fax, Pix And Info – photographer Ross Halfin said: "It was a Silver Jubilee show. This had excellent soundboard quality. I actually shot this show as a much younger man."

== Personnel ==
- Freddie Mercury: lead vocals, piano, tambourine
- Brian May: guitars, backing vocals, banjolele ("Bring Back That Leroy Brown")
- Roger Taylor: drums, percussion, backing vocals
- John Deacon: bass guitar, additional backing vocals, triangle ("Killer Queen")

== Opening acts ==
- Thin Lizzy (North America, select dates)
- Cheap Trick (Milwaukee, Madison)
- Head East (Columbus, Indianapolis)
- The Outlaws (Columbus)

== Tour dates ==
List of 1977 concerts
Date	City	Country	Venue
13 January 1977	Milwaukee	United States	Milwaukee Auditorium
14 January 1977	Madison	United States	Dane County Memorial Coliseum
15 January 1977	Columbus	United States	St. John Arena
16 January 1977	Indianapolis	United States	Indiana Convention Exposition Center
18 January 1977	Detroit	United States	Cobo Arena
20 January 1977	Saginaw	United States	Saginaw Civic Center
21 January 1977	Louisville	United States	Louisville Gardens
22 January 1977	Kalamazoo	United States	Wings Stadium
23 January 1977	Richfield	United States	The Coliseum at Richfield
25 January 1977	Ottawa	Canada	Ottawa Civic Centre
26 January 1977	Montreal	Canada	Montreal Forum
28 January 1977	Chicago	United States	Chicago Stadium
30 January 1977	Toledo	United States	Toledo Sports Arena
1 February 1977	Toronto	Canada	Maple Leaf Gardens
3 February 1977	Springfield	United States	Springfield Civic Center
4 February 1977	College Park	United States	Cole Field House
5 February 1977	New York City	United States	Madison Square Garden
6 February 1977	Uniondale	United States	Nassau Veterans Memorial Coliseum
8 February 1977	Syracuse	United States	Onondaga County War Memorial Auditorium
9 February 1977	Boston	United States	Boston Garden
10 February 1977	Providence	United States	Providence Civic Center
11 February 1977	Philadelphia	United States	Philadelphia Civic Center
19 February 1977	Pembroke Pines	United States	Hollywood Sportatorium
20 February 1977	Lakeland	United States	Lakeland Civic Center
21 February 1977	Atlanta	United States	Omni Coliseum
22 February 1977	Birmingham	United States	Boutwell Memorial Auditorium
23 February 1977	St. Louis	United States	Kiel Auditorium
25 February 1977	Dallas	United States	Moody Coliseum
26 February 1977	Houston	United States	Sam Houston Coliseum
1 March 1977	Phoenix	United States	Arizona Veterans Memorial Coliseum
2 March 1977	Inglewood	United States	The Forum
3 March 1977	Inglewood	United States	The Forum
5 March 1977	San Diego	United States	San Diego Sports Arena
6 March 1977 (Note: Originally scheduled on 5 March 1977.)	San Francisco	United States	Winterland Ballroom
11 March 1977	Vancouver	Canada	Pacific Coliseum
12 March 1977	Portland	United States	Paramount Theatre
13 March 1977	Seattle	United States	Seattle Center Arena
16 March 1977	Calgary	Canada	Southern Alberta Jubilee Auditorium
17 March 1977	Calgary	Canada	Southern Alberta Jubilee Auditorium
18 March 1977	Edmonton	Canada	Northlands Coliseum
8 May 1977	Stockholm	Sweden	Johanneshovs Isstadion
10 May 1977	Gothenburg	Sweden	Scandinavium
12 May 1977	Brøndby	Denmark	Brøndbyhallen
13 May 1977	Hamburg	West Germany	CCH Saal 1
14 May 1977 (Note: Originally scheduled at Jahrhunderthalle.)	Frankfurt	West Germany	Festhalle
16 May 1977	Düsseldorf	West Germany	Philipshalle
17 May 1977	Rotterdam	Netherlands	Rotterdam Ahoy Sportpaleis
19 May 1977	Münchenstein	Switzerland	St. Jakobshalle
23 May 1977	Bristol	England	Bristol Hippodrome
24 May 1977	Bristol	England	Bristol Hippodrome
26 May 1977	Southampton	England	Gaumont Theatre
27 May 1977	Southampton	England	Gaumont Theatre
29 May 1977	Stafford	England	Bingley Hall
30 May 1977	Glasgow	Scotland	The Apollo
31 May 1977	Glasgow	Scotland	The Apollo
2 June 1977	Liverpool	England	Liverpool Empire Theatre
3 June 1977	Liverpool	England	Liverpool Empire Theatre
6 June 1977 (Note: Originally scheduled on 5 June 1977.)	London	England	Earls Court Exhibition Centre
7 June 1977	London	England	Earls Court Exhibition Centre

== Box office score data ==
List of box office score data with date, city, venue, attendance, gross, references
Date (1977)	City	Venue	Attendance	Gross	Ref(s)
18 January	Detroit, United States	Cobo Arena	11,041 / 11,041	$79,281	
20 January	Saginaw, United States	Saginaw Civic Center	7,200 / 7,200	$42,637	
28 January	Chicago, United States	Chicago Stadium	13,000 / 13,000	$101,465	
5 February	New York City, United States	Madison Square Garden	19,600 / 19,600	$145,000	
23 February	St. Louis, United States	Kiel Auditorium	8,152	$52,754	
5 March	San Diego, United States	San Diego Sports Arena	9,518	$66,206	
