= I'm in Love with My Car =

1975 song by Queen

"I'm In Love with My Car"
- B-side label of the UK vinyl pressing of the "Bohemian Rhapsody" single release

Song by Queen

from the album A Night at the Opera
- A-side: "Bohemian Rhapsody"
- Released: 31 October 1975 (UK); 2 December 1975 (US)
- Recorded: August–September 1975
- Studio: Sarm East, London
- Genre: Hard rock; pop
- Length: 3:05 (album version); 3:11 (single version)
- Label: EMI (UK); Elektra (US)
- Songwriter: Roger Taylor
- Producers: Queen; Roy Thomas Baker

Music video
- "I'm in Love with My Car" on YouTube

"I'm in Love with My Car" is a song by the British rock band Queen, released on their fourth album A Night at the Opera in 1975. It is the album's only song written entirely by drummer Roger Taylor.

== History ==
Conceived by Roger Taylor, the lyrics were inspired by one of the band's roadies, Johnathan Harris, whose Triumph TR4 was evidently the "love of his life". The song is dedicated to him, with the liner notes mentioning, "Dedicated to Johnathan Harris, boy racer to the end".

Taylor played the guitars in the original demo, but they were later rerecorded by Brian May on his Red Special and Taylor also doubled on electric guitar in addition to drums. The lead vocals were performed by Taylor on the studio version and all released live versions. The revving sounds at the conclusion of the song were a recording of Taylor's then-current car, an Alfa Romeo.

When it came down to releasing the album's first single, Taylor was so fond of his song (especially compared to the other band members) that he locked himself in a cupboard and refused to come out until it was agreed that it would be the B-side to the album's first single, "Bohemian Rhapsody". This decision would later become the cause of internal friction in the band, in that while it was only the B-side, it generated an equal amount of publishing royalties for Taylor as "Bohemian Rhapsody" did for its songwriter, Freddie Mercury, simply because it was the B-side to the single, inadvertently leading to "I'm In Love with My Car" becoming one of the highest-grossing songs of all time.

The song was often played live from 1977 to 1981. Taylor sang it from the drums while Mercury played piano and provided backing vocals. During the News of the World Tour, Mercury would often sing the chorus lines with Taylor.

The song is used as a running joke in the 2018 Queen biopic Bohemian Rhapsody, starting with an argument between Taylor (Ben Hardy) and May (Gwilym Lee), the latter accompanied by John Deacon (Joseph Mazzello), over the song's seemingly mechanophilic lyrical content. Later in the film, fictional EMI executive Ray Foster (Mike Myers) suggests to have it or "You're My Best Friend" released as the first single to A Night at the Opera instead of "Bohemian Rhapsody". Shortly afterwards, on Kenny Everett's radio show, Mercury hands the single to the eponymous host, who then reads out "I'm In Love With My Car" rather than "Bohemian Rhapsody", which is then correctly played on air.

== Reception ==
Music writer Tom Reynolds described the song as "seriously, one of the greatest and most passionate love songs I've heard during the last thirty-plus years". AllMusic appreciated it as a "solid, hard hitting rocker" from Taylor. They observed, "The music lives up to the macho tone of the lyrics by matching up verses that swagger in a midtempo hard rock style", regarding it as an "album highlight".

== Personnel ==
- Roger Taylor – lead and backing vocals, drums, rhythm guitar
- Freddie Mercury – piano, backing vocals
- Brian May – lead guitar, backing vocals
- John Deacon – bass guitar
