= Live Killers =

Live album by Queen
- Released: 22 June 1979
- Recorded: 26 January – 1 March 1979; May 1979 (overdubs)
- Venue: Europe
- Studio: The Manor Mobile
- Genres: Hard rock; arena rock
- Length: 90:08
- Labels: EMI / Parlophone (Europe); Elektra / Hollywood (US)
- Producer: Queen

Queen chronology
Jazz (1978)	Live Killers (1979)	The Game (1980)

Singles from Live Killers
- 1. "Love of My Life" Released: 29 June 1979; 2. "We Will Rock You (Fast)" Released: 24 August 1979 (US)

Professional ratings
Review scores
Source	Rating
AllMusic	3/5 stars
Record Mirror	5/5 stars
MusicHound Rock	4/5 stars
Rolling Stone	(unfavorable)
The Rolling Stone Album Guide	2/5 stars
Smash Hits	3½/10

Live Killers is a double live album by the British rock band Queen, released on 22 June 1979. The album was recorded live during the European leg of Queen's Jazz Tour, between 26 January and 1 March 1979.

== Recording ==
The album was self-produced by the band and was their first to be mixed at their own studios, Mountain Studios in Montreux, Switzerland. Guitarist Brian May and drummer Roger Taylor later revealed on the US radio show In the Studio with Redbeard (which spotlighted the making of 1980's The Game) that the band had mixed Live Killers themselves and were unhappy with the final mix.

== Release ==
Live Killers was released as a double vinyl album in the UK by EMI on 22 June 1979, in Europe by Parlophone, and in the US by Elektra and Hollywood Records.

In the territories outside of the United States, Europe and Canada, Elektra Records re-released a shorter and edited version of the album in 1985 titled Queen Live.

The 1994 issue released as part of the Digital Master Series by EMI Records did not improve upon the quality of the previous release. It was later remastered and restored in better quality by Peter Mew in 2001.

== Reception ==
The album reached number 3 on the UK Albums Chart and number 16 on the Billboard 200 in the United States, and is certified double platinum in the US.

The album received negative reviews from critics on release. In a retrospective appraisal, Greg Prato of AllMusic found the initial reaction inexplicable, calling the album "an excellent document of Queen at the height of their '70s arena rock powers".

== Track listing ==
Side one / CD Disc 1
No.	Title	Writer(s)	Length
1.	"We Will Rock You (Fast)" (Lyon 17 February, Unknown)	Brian May	3:29
2.	"Let Me Entertain You" (Unknown)	Freddie Mercury	3:04
3.	"Death on Two Legs" (Barcelona 20 February, Overdubs)	Mercury	3:32
4.	"Killer Queen" (Frankfurt 2 February, Overdubs)	Mercury	1:59
5.	"Bicycle Race" (Frankfurt 2 February)	Mercury	1:29
6.	"I'm in Love with My Car" (Zurich 4 February)	Roger Taylor	2:01
7.	"Get Down, Make Love" (Frankfurt 2 February, Lyon 17 February, Barcelona 20 February, Paris 28 February, Paris 1 March, Unknown)	Mercury	4:31
8.	"You're My Best Friend" (Lyon 17 February)	John Deacon	2:07

Side two
No.	Title	Writer(s)	Length
9.	"Now I'm Here" (Frankfurt 2 February, Lyon 17 February, Overdubs)	May	8:44
10.	"Dreamer's Ball" (Lyon 17 February)	May	3:42
11.	"Love of My Life" (Frankfurt 2 February, Paris 27 February, Overdubs)	Mercury	4:59
12.	"'39" (Frankfurt 2 February, Overdubs)	May	3:26
13.	"Keep Yourself Alive" (Unknown)	May	4:03
Total length:			48:06

Side three / CD Disc 2
No.	Title	Writer(s)	Length
1.	"Don't Stop Me Now" (Paris 27 February, Overdubs)	Mercury	4:28
2.	"Spread Your Wings" (Unknown)	Deacon	5:14
3.	"Brighton Rock" (Frankfurt 2 February, Paris 28 February, Paris 1 March, Overdubs)	May	12:13

Side four
No.	Title	Writer(s)	Length
4.	"Bohemian Rhapsody (with "Mustapha" intro)" (Frankfurt 2 February, Overdubs)	Mercury	5:51
5.	"Tie Your Mother Down" (Frankfurt 2 February, Overdubs)	May	3:43
6.	"Sheer Heart Attack" (Lyon 17 February)	Taylor	3:36
7.	"We Will Rock You" (Frankfurt 2 February)	May	2:48
8.	"We Are the Champions" (Paris 27 February, Overdubs)	Mercury	3:27
9.	"God Save the Queen" (Rotterdam 30 January)	Trad.; arr. May	1:33
Total length:			42:53

== Omitted tracks ==
- "Somebody to Love"
- "Fat Bottomed Girls" (Version from Pavillon de Paris, 27 February 1979, was released on Bohemian Rhapsody: The Original Soundtrack)
- "If You Can't Beat Them"
- "It's Late"

== Singles ==
- "Love of My Life (Live at Festhalle Frankfurt, 2 Feb '79 – edited version)"/"Now I'm Here (Live at Festhalle Frankfurt, 2 Feb '79)"
- "We Will Rock You (Fast Version) (Live)"/"Let Me Entertain You (Live)" – Elektra E46532; released August 1979

== Personnel ==
Queen

- Freddie Mercury – lead vocals, piano
- Brian May – guitars, backing vocals
- Roger Taylor – drums, tambourine, timpani, backing vocals, lead vocals on "I'm in Love with My Car"
- John Deacon – bass guitar, backing vocals, triangle

Production

- Mastered by George Marino at Sterling Sound, NYC

== Charts ==
Chart (1979)	Peak position
Argentina (CAPIF)	10
Australia (Kent Music Report)	25
Austrian Albums (Ö3 Austria)	3
German Albums (Offizielle Top 100)	4
Finnish Albums (Suomen Virallinen)	28
Dutch Albums (Album Top 100)	9
New Zealand Albums (RMNZ)	21
Norwegian Albums (VG-lista)	10
Swedish Albums (Sverigetopplistan)	15
UK Albums (Official Charts)	3
US Billboard 200	16

Chart (1992)	Peak position
Swiss Albums (Schweizer Hitparade)	34

Chart (2006)	Peak position
Italian Albums (FIMI)	99

Chart (2026)	Peak position
German Rock & Metal Albums (Offizielle Top 100)	18

== Certifications ==
Region	Certification	Certified units/sales
Austria (IFPI Austria)	Gold	25,000^{*}
Canada (Music Canada)	Platinum	100,000^{^}
Germany (BVMI)	Gold	250,000^{^}
Japan (RIAJ)	Gold	100,000^{^}
Netherlands (NVPI)	Gold	50,000^{^}
South Africa (RISA)	Gold	25,000^{*}
Switzerland (IFPI Switzerland)	Gold	25,000^{^}
United Kingdom (BPI)	Gold	100,000^{^}
United States (RIAA)	2× Platinum	2,000,000^{^}
^{*} Sales figures based on certification alone.^{^} Shipments figures based on certification alone.
