= It's Late (Queen song) =

- US cover sleeve

Single by Queen

from the album News of the World
- B-side: "Sheer Heart Attack"
- Released: 25 April 1978
- Recorded: 1977
- Genre: Hard rock; heavy metal; blues rock; power pop
- Length: 6:22 (album version): 3:52 (single version)
- Label: Elektra
- Songwriter: Brian May
- Producers: Queen; Mike Stone

Queen singles chronology
"Spread Your Wings" (1978)	"It's Late" (1978)	"Bicycle Race" / "Fat Bottomed Girls" (1978)

Music video
- "It's Late" on YouTube

"It's Late" is a song by British rock band Queen, written by guitarist Brian May and released on their 1977 studio album, News of the World.

== Background ==
The song was May's idea of treating a song as a three-act theatrical play, and the verses are called "acts" in the lyrics sheet. It makes use of the tapping technique a few months before Eddie Van Halen's use of the tapping technique on the Van Halen album. May told Guitar Player Magazine that his use of the tapping technique was inspired by Texas guitarist Rocky Athas, after seeing one of his performances at Mother Blues, a Dallas club.

The lyrics describe a love affair that is on the verge of ending.

According to Billboard, the music of the single version "shifts gear from subdued balladry to thunderous rock'n'roll." Cash Box said that "Brian May's guitar work excellently [complements] Freddie Mercury’s embracing vocals." Record World called it a "thundering rocker [that] has quiet passages and a good melody, then roars through the choruses."

== Release ==
The song was released as a single in North America, Japan and New Zealand in 1978, albeit in heavily edited form, and peaked at #74 on the U.S. Billboard Hot 100 and #66 on the Cash Box Top 100. The song was later included on the Queen Rocks compilation in 1997.

== Personnel ==
=== Queen ===
- Freddie Mercury – lead and backing vocals
- Brian May – electric guitar, backing vocals
- Roger Taylor – drums, backing vocals
- John Deacon – bass guitar
