= Wessex Sound Studios =

Recording studio in London, England

Coordinates: 51°33′17″N 0°5′29″W

Wessex Sound Studios was a recording studio located at 106a Highbury New Park, London, England. Many renowned popular music artists recorded there, including King Crimson, Queen, Sex Pistols, the Clash, Pete Townshend and the Pretenders. The property was sold to a residential development company in 2003.

== History ==
Around 1950, Ron Thompson started the Wessex Recording Service and mobile recording unit at his home in Wiltshire, naming it after its location which was historically the kingdom of Wessex. A short time later, Thompson and his family moved to Bournemouth, where he ran a hi-fi shop above a recording studio that recorded local groups and musicians, as well as a sound service for 16mm industrial films. By 1959, Thompson was joined by his son Mike. The studio became successful and was moved to a larger location in downtown Bournemouth, with a second location eventually opened at 30 Old Compton Street in the West End of London, recording such notable artists as John Barry and Max Bygraves. By the mid-1960s the company was in need of a larger studio and Thompson wrote to church commissioners in hopes that there was a church hall they wanted to sell.

The building that would become Wessex Studios, located at 106a Highbury New Park in North London, was built in 1881 as the church hall of St Augustine's Church. Like other buildings of the Victorian era, it featured Gothic design. From 1946 to 1949 it was the home of the Rank Organisation's Company of Youth - more popularly known as the Rank Charm School - where future stars of British films, such as Diana Dors, Christopher Lee, Barbara Murray and Pete Murray, were tutored and paid about £10/week. Rank had a film studio in the former Highbury Athenaeum building up the road at 96a Highbury Park where supporting features (B-movies) were made; the film studio also closed in 1949.

In 1966, Ron Thompson and his partners went into partnership with Wessex studio client and songwriter Les Reed, who purchased the Highbury Park building and closed the Bournemouth studio. The brothers Mike and Robin Thompson converted the church hall into a recording studio and outfitted it with an 8-track Neve mixing console, the third console built by Thompson's longtime friend Rupert Neve. The studio, however did not immediately offer 8-track recording facilities, before Trident Studios in Soho, which was the first operational 8-track studio in London. Mike Batt recalls recording his first single at Wessex in 1968 on 4-track, then subsequently in the early seventies many other albums including all four of the Wombles' albums, using state-of-the-art 24-track.

King Crimson recorded their first three studio albums at Wessex's newest location, including In the Court of the Crimson King. The Moody Blues recorded their 1969 album, To Our Children's Children's Children, at Wessex, for which Robin Thompson received a Grammy Award nomination. In 1970, a new custom 24-channel Neve console was installed and widely advertised as "London's first 24-track desk". In 1974, Queen recorded portions of Sheer Heart Attack at Wessex.

In 1975, the Chrysalis Group purchased both Wessex Studios and George Martin's AIR Studios; Martin became a director of the company and producer/engineer Bill Price became the managing director of Wessex. The facility underwent a major renovation with new 32-channel Cadac mixing desks. In October of 1976, the Sex Pistols recorded their debut single "Anarchy in the U.K." at Wessex, returning the following year to record the band's only studio album, Never Mind the Bollocks, Here's the Sex Pistols. At the same time, Queen was also at Wessex, recording material for News of the World. As a result, the two groups had several interactions, including the famous meeting between Freddie Mercury and Sid Vicious. Vicious, upon stumbling into the studio where Queen was working, asked "Have you succeeded in bringing ballet to the masses yet?" in response to a comment the singer had made in an interview with NME, to which Mercury called him "Simon Ferocious" (a reference to Vicious' real name) and replied "We're doing our best, dear." Johnny Rotten also expressed a desire to meet with Mercury. According to Wessex engineer Bill Price, Rotten crawled on all fours across Queen's studio to Mercury, who was playing piano, and said "Hello Freddie" before leaving. Brian May also recalled bumping into Rotten in the corridors and having several conversations about music.

Other notable albums recorded at Wessex in this era include the Pretenders' first and second studio albums, the Clash's 1979 album London Calling and Generation X's Valley of the Dolls. Other bands recording at Wessex during this timeframe included the Damned, Public Image Ltd and Talk Talk.

In 1993, Chrysalis sold Wessex to Nigel Frida, who made it part of his Matrix Studio group, re-naming it Matrix-Wessex. In 2003, the studio closed and the building was sold to the Neptune Group, which converted it into a residential development known as "The Recording Studio", comprising eight apartments and a townhouse.
