= Van Halen 1978 World Tour =

1978 concert tour by Van Halen

- Promotional tour by Van Halen
- Poster to one of the Austin concerts
- Location: Asia; Europe; North America
- Associated album: Van Halen
- Start date: March 3, 1978
- End date: December 3, 1978
- Legs: 8
- No. of shows: 180

Van Halen concert chronology
- 1978 World Tour (1978); World Vacation Tour (1979)

The 1978 World Tour was the first concert tour by the American hard rock band Van Halen. The world tour, which was in support of their debut album, covered mainly North America with 125 shows in the United States and two shows in Canada, 38 shows in Europe, and seven shows in Japan. At 172 shows total over a 10-month period, the tour was one of the band's most extensive overall. Throughout the tour Van Halen was mostly a supporting act for bands such as Black Sabbath and Journey, however, Van Halen headlined shows in Europe and Japan.

== Background ==
=== First North American leg ===
See also Infinity Tour

Van Halen started their first leg opening for acts Montrose and Journey. Herbie Herbert, the manager for Journey at the time, recalled bringing guitarist Neal Schon of Journey along with him to go see the band in New York to a sold out audience of 3,500 people.

=== Opening for Black Sabbath ===
See also Never Say Die! Tour (Black Sabbath)

"We did 23 shows in 25 days," recalled Eddie Van Halen regarding the European leg. "I didn't know they had that many places! But to meet Tony Iommi when I was so into him was really incredible." David Lee Roth summed up the experience as "a real shot in the ass". The Liverpool Empire Theatre date was attended by future members of Apollo 440 – who, in 1997, issued an adaptation of Van Halen's 'Ain't Talkin' 'bout Love' as 'Ain't Talkin' 'bout Dub'.

"We had a great time with the Sabbath guys…" recalled Alex Van Halen. "It was really special because Ed and I were big fans of the band. Every time they came to LA, I was out there in the audience, fighting tooth and nail to get to the front so I could get my eardrums destroyed. But I learned a lot from them about audience participation… One time, we were up near Leicester, about half an hour before showtime, and Ozzy and Bill Ward were out there on the front lawn with the punters, having a beer. I thought, 'Fuck me, none of this star-type shit.' I was really impressed."

"Ozzy used to tell a funny story…" recalled onetime Osbourne sidekick Don Airey. "Sabbath had done a tour for a year [sic] with Kiss… and it nearly killed him because Kiss had been so good. And he said, 'We're never doing that again. Next tour, we just want a bar band from LA. That's all we want.' And then he got to the first gig. Ozzy said they walked in as 'Eruption' was going on. Ozzy said, 'We just went into the dressing room. We sat there going, That was incredible… and then it finished, and we were just too stunned to speak. Then there was a knock on the door and the best-looking man in the world walked in and said, Hello' – you know, David Lee Roth. I think they only lasted about two months on that tour. Then the record broke… I went to see them at the Rainbow when they supported Sabbath. By the time they played the Rainbow again a month later, they were headlining. Incredible!"

Of the North American leg of the tour, Ozzy Osbourne said: "Van Halen are so good they ought to be headlining the tour."

== Tour dates ==
List of 1978 concerts
Date	City	Country	Venue	Support Act(s)
March 3, 1978	Chicago	United States	Aragon Ballroom (Live premiere)	Journey; Montrose
March 4, 1978	Springfield	United States	Nelson Center	Journey; Montrose
~~March 5, 1978~~	Indianapolis	United States	Indiana Convention Center	Journey; Montrose
March 7, 1978	Madison	United States	Shuffle Inn	Journey; Montrose
March 9, 1978	Milwaukee	United States	Riverside Theater	Journey; Montrose
March 10, 1978	Detroit	United States	Masonic Temple Theater	Journey; Montrose
March 11, 1978	Trotwood	United States	Hara Arena	Journey; Montrose
March 12, 1978	Homestead	United States	Leona Theater	Journey; Montrose
~~March 14, 1978~~	Toronto	Canada	Massey Hall	Journey; Montrose
March 15, 1978	Cleveland	United States	Cleveland Music Hall	Journey; Montrose
March 16, 1978	Columbus	United States	Columbus Veterans Memorial Auditorium	Journey; Montrose
March 17, 1978	Louisville	United States	Louisville Gardens	Journey; Montrose
March 18, 1978	Evansville	United States	Evansville Coliseum	Journey; Montrose
March 19, 1978	South Bend	United States	Morris Civic Auditorium	Journey; Montrose
March 20, 1978	Schaumburg	United States	B'Ginnings	Journey; Montrose
~~March 21, 1978~~	~~Utica~~	United States	~~Utica Memorial Auditorium~~	Journey; Montrose
March 22, 1978	Albany	United States	Palace Theatre	Journey; Montrose
March 23, 1978	Buffalo	United States	New Century Theatre	Journey; Montrose
March 24, 1978	Upper Darby	United States	Tower Theater	Journey; Montrose
March 25, 1978	New York City	United States	Palladium	Journey; Montrose
March 26, 1978	Hempstead	United States	Calderone Concert Hall	Journey; Montrose
March 27, 1978	Boston	United States	Paradise Theater	Journey; Montrose
March 29, 1978	Duluth	United States	Duluth Auditorium	Journey; Montrose
March 30, 1978	Saint Paul	United States	St. Paul Civic Center Theater	Journey; Montrose
March 31, 1978	Kansas City	United States	Memorial Hall	Journey; Montrose
April 1, 1978	St. Louis	United States	Kiel Opera House	Journey; Montrose
April 2, 1978	Omaha	United States	Omaha Music Hall	Journey; Montrose
April 3, 1978	Wichita	United States	Pogo's	Journey; Montrose
April 4, 1978	Tulsa	United States	Cain's Ballroom	Journey; Montrose
April 5, 1978	Indianapolis	United States	Murat Temple Theater	Journey; Montrose
April 6, 1978	Flint	United States	IMA Auditorium	Journey; Montrose
April 7, 1978	Nashville	United States	War Memorial Auditorium	Journey; Montrose
April 8, 1978	Murray	United States	MSU Field House	Journey; Montrose
April 9, 1978	Birmingham	United States	Boutwell Memorial Auditorium	Journey; Montrose
April 11, 1978	Corpus Christi	United States	Corpus Christi Memorial Coliseum	Journey; Montrose
April 12, 1978	Austin	United States	Austin Municipal Auditorium	Journey; Montrose
April 13, 1978	Shreveport	United States	Shreveport Memorial Auditorium	Journey; Montrose
April 14, 1978	Fort Worth	United States	Will Rogers Memorial Auditorium	Journey; Montrose
April 15, 1978	Houston	United States	Houston Music Hall	Journey; Montrose
April 16, 1978	New Orleans	United States	The Warehouse	Journey; Montrose
April 18, 1978	Memphis	United States	Ellis Memorial Auditorium	Journey; Montrose
April 20, 1978	Tallahassee	United States	Ruby Diamond Auditorium	Journey; Montrose
April 21, 1978	Pembroke Pines	United States	Hollywood Sportatorium	Journey; Montrose
April 22, 1978	Tampa	United States	Curtis Hixon Hall	Journey; Montrose
April 23, 1978	Atlanta	United States	Fox Theatre	Journey; Montrose
April 25, 1978	Virginia Beach	United States	Rogues' Gallery	—N/a
April 26, 1978	Virginia Beach	United States	Rogues' Gallery	—N/a
April 27, 1978	Norfolk	United States	The Scope	—N/a
April 28, 1978	New York City	United States	Palladium	—N/a
May 4, 1978	Poperinge	Belgium	Zaal Maeckeblijde	—N/a
May 5, 1978	Delft	Netherlands	De Stads Doelen	—N/a
May 6, 1978	Amsterdam	Netherlands	Paradiso	—N/a
May 8, 1978	Hamburg	West Germany	Markthalle Hamburg	—N/a
May 9, 1978	Hamburg	West Germany	Markthalle Hamburg	—N/a
May 10, 1978	Hamburg	West Germany	Markthalle Hamburg	—N/a
May 12, 1978	Paris	France	Théâtre Mogador	—N/a
May 16, 1978	Sheffield	England	Sheffield City Hall	Black Sabbath
May 17, 1978	Southport	England	Southport Theatre	Black Sabbath
May 18, 1978	Glasgow	Scotland	Glasgow Apollo	Black Sabbath
May 19, 1978	Aberdeen	Scotland	Capitol Theatre	Black Sabbath
May 21, 1978	Newcastle	England	Newcastle City Hall	Black Sabbath
May 22, 1978	Manchester	England	Manchester Apollo	Black Sabbath
May 23, 1978	Stoke	England	Victoria Hall	Black Sabbath
May 25, 1978	Portsmouth	England	Portsmouth Guildhall	Black Sabbath
May 26, 1978	Bristol	England	Colston Hall	Black Sabbath
May 27, 1978	London	England	Lewisham Odeon	Black Sabbath
May 28, 1978	Ipswich	England	Ipswich Gaumont Theatre	Black Sabbath
May 30, 1978	Coventry	England	Coventry Theatre	Black Sabbath
May 31, 1978	Leicester	England	De Montfort Hall	Black Sabbath
June 1, 1978	London	England	Hammersmith Odeon	Black Sabbath
June 2, 1978	Oxford	England	Apollo Theatre Oxford	Black Sabbath
June 3, 1978	Southampton	England	Southampton Gaumont Theatre	Black Sabbath
June 5, 1978	Birmingham	England	Birmingham Odeon	Black Sabbath
~~June 6, 1978~~	Birmingham	England	Birmingham Odeon	Black Sabbath
June 7, 1978	Bradford	England	St George's Hall	Black Sabbath
June 8, 1978	Preston	England	Preston Guild Hall	Black Sabbath
June 10, 1978	London	England	Hammersmith Odeon	Black Sabbath
~~June 11, 1978~~	London	England	Hammersmith Odeon	Black Sabbath
June 17, 1978	Tokyo	Japan	Tokyo Cultural Hall	—N/a
June 19, 1978	Tokyo	Japan	Tokyo Cultural Hall	—N/a
June 21, 1978	Tokyo	Japan	Nakano Sun Plaza Hall	—N/a
June 22, 1978	Tokyo	Japan	Nakano Sun Plaza Hall	—N/a
June 24, 1978	Nagoya	Japan	Nagoya Civic Assembly Hall	—N/a
June 25, 1978	Osaka	Japan	Festival Hall	—N/a
June 27, 1978	Osaka	Japan	Osaka Cultural Hall	—N/a
July 1, 1978	Dallas	United States	Cotton Bowl (Texxas Jam)	—N/a
July 2, 1978	San Antonio	United States	San Antonio Municipal Auditorium	—N/a
July 3, 1978	Austin	United States	Armadillo World Headquarters	—N/a
July 6, 1978	Phoenix	United States	Celebrity Theatre	—N/a
July 7, 1978	Phoenix	United States	Celebrity Theatre	—N/a
July 8, 1978	San Diego	United States	San Diego Sports Arena	—N/a
July 9, 1978	Long Beach	United States	Long Beach Arena	—N/a
July 13, 1978	New Orleans	United States	The Superdome	The Rolling Stones; The Doobie Brothers
July 15, 1978	Kansas City	United States	Royals Stadium (Summer Jam)	Kansas; Steve Miller Band; Eddie Money
July 16, 1978	Davenport	United States	Credit Island Park (Mississippi River Jam)	The Doobie Brothers; Atlanta Rhythm Section; Journey
July 17, 1978	La Crosse	United States	Mary E. Sawyer Auditorium	Journey
July 18, 1978	Seymour	United States	Seymour Speedway	Journey
~~July 21, 1978~~	Jackson	United States	Carl Perkins Civic Auditorium	Journey
July 23, 1978	Oakland	United States	Oakland Coliseum (Day on the Green 1978 #3)	Aerosmith; Foreigner; Pat Travers; AC/DC
July 24, 1978	Redding	United States	Redding Civic Center	—N/a
July 25, 1978	Reno	United States	Washoe County Fairgrounds	—N/a
July 29, 1978	Lake Charles	United States	Lake Charles Civic Center	—N/a
July 31, 1978	Alexandria	United States	Rapides Parish Coliseum	—N/a
August 2, 1978	Wichita Falls	United States	Wichita Falls Memorial Auditorium	—N/a
August 3, 1978	Lubbock	United States	Lubbock Municipal Auditorium	—N/a
August 4, 1978	Amarillo	United States	Hollywood Bowl (West Texas Jam 1978)	—N/a
August 5, 1978	Great Bend	United States	SRCA Raceway (Summer Jam)	—N/a
August 6, 1978	Oklahoma City	United States	Oklahoma State Fairgrounds Grandstand (Oklahoma Jam 1978)	—N/a
August 7, 1978	Wichita	United States	Pogo's	—N/a
August 9, 1978	Peoria	United States	Second Chance	—N/a
August 10, 1978	Salem	United States	Hooker Lake Inn	
August 12, 1978	Landover	United States	Capital Centre	Ted Nugent
August 13, 1978	Binghamton	United States	Broome County Arena	Ted Nugent
August 19, 1978	Bay City	United States	Engel Stadium (Summer Celebration)	Bob Seger; Bandit
August 22, 1978	Milwaukee	United States	MECCA Arena	Black Sabbath
August 23, 1978	Chicago	United States	International Amphitheatre	Black Sabbath
August 24, 1978	Chicago	United States	International Amphitheatre	Black Sabbath
August 25, 1978	Terre Haute	United States	Hulman Arena	Black Sabbath
August 27, 1978	New York City	United States	Madison Square Garden	Black Sabbath
August 28, 1978	Uniondale NY	United States	Nassau Coliseum	Black Sabbath
August 29, 1978	Philadelphia	United States	Spectrum	Black Sabbath
~~August 30, 1978~~	Poughkeepsie	United States	Mid-Hudson Civic Center	Black Sabbath
August 31, 1978	Erie	United States	Erie County Field House	Black Sabbath
September 1, 1978	Hampton	United States	Hampton Coliseum	Black Sabbath
September 2, 1978	Pittsburgh	United States	Pittsburgh Civic Arena	Black Sabbath
September 4, 1978	South Yarmouth	United States	Cape Cod Coliseum	Black Sabbath
September 5, 1978	Portland	United States	Cumberland County Civic Center	Black Sabbath
September 7, 1978	Utica	United States	Utica Memorial Auditorium	Black Sabbath
September 8, 1978	Niagara Falls	United States	Niagara Falls Convention Center	Black Sabbath
September 9, 1978	Baltimore	United States	Baltimore Civic Center	Black Sabbath
September 10, 1978	New Haven	United States	New Haven Coliseum	Black Sabbath
September 12, 1978	Indianapolis	United States	Indianapolis Convention Center	Black Sabbath
September 14, 1978	Detroit	United States	Cobo Arena	Black Sabbath
September 15, 1978	Richfield	United States	Richfield Coliseum	Black Sabbath
September 16, 1978	St. Louis	United States	Checkerdome	Black Sabbath
September 17, 1978	Kansas City	United States	Kansas City Municipal Auditorium	Black Sabbath
September 18, 1978	Tulsa	United States	Tulsa Assembly Center	Black Sabbath
September 21, 1978	Bakersfield	United States	Bakersfield Civic Auditorium	Black Sabbath
September 22, 1978	Fresno	United States	Selland Arena	Black Sabbath
September 23, 1978	Anaheim	United States	Anaheim Stadium (Summerfest 1978)	Black Sabbath
~~September 26, 1978~~	Vancouver	Canada	Pacific Coliseum	Black Sabbath
September 27, 1978	Portland	United States	Portland Memorial Coliseum	Black Sabbath
September 28, 1978	Spokane	United States	Spokane Coliseum	Black Sabbath
September 29, 1978	Seattle	United States	Seattle Center Coliseum	Black Sabbath
September 30, 1978	Seattle	United States	Seattle Center Coliseum	Black Sabbath
October 9, 1978	Hamburg	West Germany	Audimax Theatre	Black Sabbath
October 10, 1978	Essen	West Germany	Grugahalle	Black Sabbath
October 11, 1978	Offenbach	West Germany	Stadthalle Offenbach	Black Sabbath
October 13, 1978	Uhingen	West Germany	Haldenberg Hall	Black Sabbath
October 14, 1978	Ludwigshafen	West Germany	Friedrich-Ebert-Halle	Black Sabbath
October 15, 1978	Kuernach	West Germany	Kuernach Hall	Black Sabbath
October 17, 1978	Neunkirchen	West Germany	Hemmerleinhalle	Black Sabbath
October 18, 1978	Bad Rappenau	West Germany	Bad Rappenau Sports Hall	Black Sabbath
October 20, 1978	Cambrai	France	Grottos Palace	Black Sabbath
October 22, 1978	London	England	Rainbow Theatre	—N/a
October 27, 1978	Koekelare	Belgium	Koekelare Sports Hall	—N/a
November 3, 1978	St. Petersburg	United States	Bayfront Center	Black Sabbath
November 4, 1978	Jacksonville	United States	Jacksonville Coliseum	Black Sabbath
November 5, 1978	Pembroke Pines	United States	Hollywood Sportatorium	Black Sabbath
~~November 7, 1978~~	~~Columbus~~	United States	~~Municipal Auditorium~~	Black Sabbath
November 8, 1978	Birmingham	United States	Boutwell Memorial Auditorium	Black Sabbath
~~November 9, 1978~~	~~Nashville~~	United States	~~Nashville Municipal Auditorium~~	Black Sabbath
November 10, 1978	Memphis	United States	Mid-South Coliseum	Black Sabbath
November 11, 1978	Cincinnati	United States	Riverfront Coliseum	Black Sabbath
November 12, 1978	Nashville	United States	Nashville Municipal Auditorium	Black Sabbath
November 13, 1978	Atlanta	United States	Omni Coliseum	Black Sabbath
November 14, 1978	Mobile	United States	Mobile Municipal Auditorium	Black Sabbath
November 15, 1978	Huntsville	United States	Von Braun Civic Center	Black Sabbath
November 17, 1978	Austin	United States	Austin Municipal Auditorium	Black Sabbath
November 18, 1978	Midland	United States	Chaparral Center	Black Sabbath
November 19, 1978	Houston	United States	Sam Houston Coliseum	Black Sabbath
November 20, 1978	Oklahoma City	United States	Myriad Convention Center	Black Sabbath
November 22, 1978	Corpus Christi	United States	Corpus Christi Memorial Coliseum	Black Sabbath
November 23, 1978	Houston	United States	Sam Houston Coliseum	Black Sabbath
November 24, 1978	San Antonio	United States	San Antonio Convention Center	Black Sabbath
November 25, 1978	Dallas	United States	Dallas Convention Center	Black Sabbath
November 26, 1978	Dallas	United States	Dallas Convention Center	Black Sabbath
November 28, 1978	Denver	United States	McNichols Sports Arena	Black Sabbath
November 29, 1978	Ogden	United States	Dee Events Center	Black Sabbath
~~December 1, 1978~~	~~San Bernardino~~	United States	~~Swing Auditorium~~	Black Sabbath
December 2, 1978	Oakland	United States	Oakland Arena	Black Sabbath
December 3, 1978	San Diego	United States	San Diego Sports Arena	Black Sabbath
~~December 4, 1978~~	~~Long Beach~~	United States	~~Long Beach Arena~~	—N/a
~~December 5, 1978~~	~~Phoenix~~	United States	~~Arizona Veterans Memorial Coliseum~~	—N/a
~~December 7, 1978~~	~~Abilene~~	United States	~~Taylor County Expo Center~~	—N/a
~~December 8, 1978~~	~~El Paso~~	United States	~~El Paso County Coliseum~~	—N/a
~~December 10, 1978~~	~~Albuquerque~~	United States	~~Johnson Gymnasium~~	—N/a
~~December 11, 1978~~	~~Albuquerque~~	United States	~~Johnson Gymnasium~~	—N/a

=== Box office score data ===
List of box office score data with date, city, venue, attendance, gross, references
Date (1978)	City	Venue	Attendance	Gross	Ref(s)
July 9	Long Beach	Long Beach Arena	8,614	$51,652	
July 13	New Orleans	The Superdome	80,173	$1,060,000	
July 15	Kansas City	Royals Stadium	34,541	$423,904	
August 19	Bay City	Engel Stadium	22,572	$201,513	
September 4	South Yarmouth	Cape Cod Coliseum	7,100	$53,888	
September 5	Portland	Cumberland County Civic Center	7,744	$57,606	
September 8	Niagara Falls	Convention Center	8,186	$62,267	
September 9	Baltimore	Civic Center	9,253	$65,887	
September 10	New Haven	Coliseum	7,438	$52,289	

== Personnel ==
- Eddie Van Halen – guitar and background vocals
- David Lee Roth – lead vocals and acoustic guitar
- Michael Anthony – bass and background vocals
- Alex Van Halen – drums
