= Van Halen World Vacation Tour =

1979 concert tour by Van Halen

World Vacation Tour
- Tour by Van Halen
- Poster to the concert in Pittsburgh, USA
- Location: Europe; Japan; North America
- Associated album: Van Halen II
- Start date: March 25, 1979
- End date: October 7, 1979
- Legs: 5
- No. of shows: 108

Van Halen concert chronology
- 1978 World Tour (1978); World Vacation Tour (1979); World Invasion Tour (1980)

The World Vacation Tour was the second concert tour by the American hard rock band Van Halen in support of their second studio album Van Halen II.

== Background ==
The band began their first full headlining tour in Fresno on March 25, 1979. The band were performing in arenas throughout the United States, where they had performed previously as an opening act. The band was set to perform in Spokane on April 14, but had postponed their show to April 19 due to an illness from one of the band members. The tour was a financial success for the band, aside from the additional costs of having extra lighting and sound equipment. The band had also toured Europe for two weeks and Asia during this tour, playing to larger audiences than they previously had on their first tour. The tour concluded on October 7, 1979, with a performance at the Forum in Inglewood where Eddie and Alex lived.

== Reception ==
Nelson George, a reviewer for the magazine Billboard, gave the performance in New York City on May 12, 1979, a positive review. He opened with the acknowledgement of a sold out young and dedicated crowd as well as recognizing the two studio albums released by the band having also achieved gold. He praised the usage of backlights and colored light combinations, stating that the show despite being in its frenzy was well choreographed and slick with the noting of Roth's energy on stage. However, he criticized the sound based on how Eddie and Michael were washing away the vocals of Roth with the buzzing of their cordless guitars.

Music critic Bob Ross from the St. Petersburg Times, had also gave the band's performance a positive review after attending the Lakeland show, opening with a headline that Van Halen was "irresistibly entertaining". He noted on the excitement from the audience that the band had generated from 6,000 fans. He praised the energy, enthusiasm and simplicity techniques. When talking about Eddie Van Halen, he noted him as interesting a lead guitarist, comparing him to many other rising guitarists from other band in the decade. Commenting on Eddie's abilities during the show, he said the feedback never faltered, and his performance was a reminder that great rock music is fun, super-tight and never pompous. Ross concluded his review, agreeing with bassist Michael Anthony that Van Halen shouldn't change the basic sound the band developed.

Posting his review in the Leader-Post, Mike McVean gave the Regina, Saskatchewan performance he attended a positive review, opening that the 5,750 euphoric fans in attendance weren't disappointed - which ranged from 12 to 18 year olds having compared them to being like cattle going to the slaughterhouse. He noted that the band had put on a "cranium-splitting show" which featured a minimum of definition and clarity of lyric and a maximum of energy throughout the performance, sticking to what the show was about as he cited: "heavy metal hard rock". He praised both the quality of Eddie Van Halen's guitar work and David Lee Roth's vocals, comparing them to being a Robert Plant-style presence but criticized that the guitar riffs and leaps were of much relevance stating that one brick does not make a wall of sound. Concert attendee Verna Mogk was very disappointed with McVean's review, stating that they did not feel like a cow being led to the slaughterhouse, and did not appreciate being referred to that way. They noted on the fantastic musical abilities of the band with evidence of the loud applause the audience gave to them, remarking that McVean should check with his family physician for migraine relief after his "cranium-splitting" comment, with hopes the band did not read the review he made, following an "excellent and entertaining show".

However, Ted Drozdowski from the Morning Record and Journal gave the New Haven performance a negative review, opening his review with stating the band was miserably poor in concert with the simple statement: "Van Halen stinks!" He stated that the band was very disorganized and immature with no sense of timing, featured a hate-inspired stage presence as well as noting on an ugly light show. Despite the stage show was he quoted as "sad", he stated that the band was nowhere near the quality and perfection of their studio recordings. He criticized that the band was trying to be a copy of Led Zeppelin, with the band's lack of intelligence preventing even a mediocre copy. Having noted on the various issues that the band members had, as well as Roth's performance, comparing him to a prancing fool who behaved like a headless chicken, he also referred to Eddie Van Halen's guitar playing, also accusing him of cheating to achieve his claim to fame. He concluded his review, stating it was a terrible performing band and a waste of the price on a concert ticket.

== Tour dates ==
List of 1979 concerts, showing date, city, country and venue
Date	City	Country	Venue
March 25, 1979	Fresno	United States	Selland Arena
March 26, 1979	Redding	United States	Redding Civic Auditorium
March 27, 1979	Central Point	United States	Compton Arena
March 29, 1979	Missoula	United States	Adams Field House
March 30, 1979	Caldwell	United States	O'Connor Field House
March 31, 1979	Logan	United States	Smith Spectrum
April 3, 1979	Tacoma	United States	UPS Memorial Field House
April 5, 1979	San Rafael	United States	Marin Veterans Memorial Auditorium
April 6, 1979	San Jose	United States	San Jose Performing Arts Theater
April 7, 1979	San Jose	United States	San Jose Performing Arts Theater
April 8, 1979	Los Angeles	United States	Los Angeles Memorial Coliseum (California World Music Festival #2)
April 10, 1979	Reno	United States	Centennial Coliseum
April 12, 1979	Seattle	United States	Seattle Center Coliseum
April 13, 1979	Seattle	United States	Seattle Center Coliseum
~~April 14, 1979~~	~~Spokane~~	United States	~~Spokane Coliseum~~
April 16, 1979	Portland	United States	Jantzen Beach Ice Arena
April 17, 1979	Portland	United States	Jantzen Beach Ice Arena
April 18, 1979	Vancouver	Canada	Pacific Coliseum
April 19, 1979	Spokane	United States	Spokane Coliseum
April 21, 1979	Boulder	United States	Balch Fieldhouse
April 22, 1979	Boulder	United States	Balch Fieldhouse
April 24, 1979	Kansas City	United States	Kansas City Music Hall
April 26, 1979	Chicago	United States	Aragon Ballroom
April 27, 1979	Chicago	United States	Aragon Ballroom
April 28, 1979	St. Louis	United States	Checkerdome
April 29, 1979	Indianapolis	United States	Market Square Arena
May 1, 1979	Detroit	United States	Detroit Masonic Temple
May 2, 1979	Detroit	United States	Detroit Masonic Temple
May 3, 1979	Kalamazoo	United States	Wings Stadium
May 5, 1979	Cincinnati	United States	Riverfront Coliseum
May 6, 1979	Louisville	United States	Louisville Gardens
May 7, 1979	Pittsburgh	United States	Stanley Theatre
May 8, 1979	Toledo	United States	Toledo Sports Arena
May 9, 1979	Buffalo	United States	Buffalo Memorial Auditorium
May 11, 1979	Washington, D.C.	United States	Warner Theatre
May 12, 1979	New York City	United States	Palladium
May 13, 1979	Boston	United States	Orpheum Theatre
May 15, 1979	Toronto	Canada	Maple Leaf Gardens
May 16, 1979	London	Canada	London Gardens
May 17, 1979	Syracuse	United States	Manley Field House
May 18, 1979	Rochester	United States	Rochester Community War Memorial Arena ("Don Kirshner's Rock Concert")
May 19, 1979	Philadelphia	United States	Spectrum
May 30, 1979	Atlanta	United States	Fox Theatre
May 31, 1979	Charlotte	United States	Charlotte Coliseum
June 1, 1979	Norfolk	United States	Scope Arena
June 2, 1979	Raleigh	United States	Carter–Finley Stadium (June Jam)
June 4, 1979	Knoxville	United States	Knoxville Civic Coliseum
June 5, 1979	Birmingham	United States	Boutwell Memorial Auditorium
June 7, 1979	Memphis	United States	Mid-South Coliseum
June 8, 1979	Little Rock	United States	Barton Coliseum
June 9, 1979	Dallas	United States	Cotton Bowl (Texxas Jam)
June 10, 1979	New Orleans	United States	The Superdome (A Day of Rock 'N' Roll)
June 14, 1979	Brussels	Belgium	Forest National
June 15, 1979	Amsterdam	Netherlands	Jaap Edenhal
June 17, 1979	Düsseldorf	West Germany	Philips Hall
June 18, 1979	Offenbach	West Germany	Stadthalle Offenbach
June 19, 1979	Munich	West Germany	Circus Krone Building
June 21, 1979	Lyon	France	Palais des Sports de Gerland
June 22, 1979	Paris	France	Pavillon de Paris
June 25, 1979	Birmingham	England	Birmingham Odeon
June 26, 1979	Newcastle	England	Newcastle City Hall
June 27, 1979	Manchester	England	Manchester Apollo Theatre
June 28, 1979	London	England	Rainbow Theatre
June 29, 1979	London	England	Rainbow Theatre
July 5, 1979	Jacksonville	United States	Jacksonville Exhibition Hall
July 6, 1979	West Palm Beach	United States	West Palm Beach Auditorium
July 7, 1979	Miami	United States	Miami Jai-Alai Fronton Arena
July 8, 1979	Lakeland	United States	Lakeland Civic Center
July 10, 1979	Corpus Christi	United States	Corpus Christi Memorial Coliseum
July 11, 1979	Houston	United States	Houston Music Hall
July 12, 1979	Houston	United States	Houston Music Hall
July 14, 1979	Amarillo	United States	Amarillo Civic Center
July 15, 1979	Midland	United States	Chaparral Center
July 16, 1979	Austin	United States	Austin Municipal Auditorium
July 17, 1979	San Antonio	United States	San Antonio Convention Center
July 19, 1979	Wichita	United States	Century II Concert Hall
July 20, 1979	Tulsa	United States	Tulsa Assembly Center
July 21, 1979	Oklahoma City	United States	Gaylord Performing Arts Theater
July 22, 1979	Lincoln	United States	Pershing Memorial Auditorium
July 24, 1979	Saint Paul	United States	St. Paul Civic Auditorium
July 25, 1979	Saint Paul	United States	St. Paul Civic Auditorium
July 26, 1979	Dubuque	United States	Five Flags Arena
July 27, 1979	Springfield	United States	Illinois State Armory
July 28, 1979	Trotwood	United States	Hara Arena
August 10, 1979	Portland	United States	Cumberland County Civic Center
August 11, 1979	Asbury Park	United States	Asbury Park Convention Hall
August 12, 1979	New Haven	United States	New Haven Coliseum
August 14, 1979	Cleveland	United States	Cleveland Music Hall
August 15, 1979	Cleveland	United States	Cleveland Music Hall
August 17, 1979	Springfield	United States	Springfield Civic Center
August 18, 1979	South Yarmouth	United States	Cape Cod Coliseum
August 20, 1979	Madison	United States	Dane County Veterans Memorial Coliseum
August 21, 1979	Milwaukee	United States	Milwaukee Auditorium
August 25, 1979	Oakland	United States	Oakland Civic Auditorium
August 26, 1979	Oakland	United States	Oakland Civic Auditorium
September 3, 1979	Kyoto	Japan	Kyoto Kaikan
September 5, 1979	Fukuoka	Japan	Fukuoka Kyuden Kinen Gymnasium
September 7, 1979	Nagoya	Japan	Nagoya Civic Assembly Hall
September 8, 1979	Kurashiki	Japan	Kurashiki Civic Cultural Hall
September 10, 1979	Osaka	Japan	Osaka Prefectural Gymnasium
September 11, 1979	Osaka	Japan	Osaka Prefectural Gymnasium
September 13, 1979	Tokyo	Japan	Nippon Budokan
September 18, 1979	Edmonton	Canada	Northlands Coliseum
September 19, 1979	Calgary	Canada	Stampede Corral
September 22, 1979	Regina	Canada	Agridome
September 23, 1979	Winnipeg	Canada	Winnipeg Convention Centre
September 25, 1979	Duluth	United States	Duluth Arena
September 27, 1979	Bismarck	United States	Bismarck Civic Center
September 28, 1979	Rapid City	United States	Rushmore Plaza Civic Center
September 29, 1979	Billings	United States	MetraPark Arena
October 2, 1979	Tucson	United States	Tucson Community Center
October 3, 1979	Phoenix	United States	Phoenix Exhibition Hall
October 6, 1979	San Diego	United States	San Diego Sports Arena
October 7, 1979	Inglewood	United States	The Forum

=== Box office score data ===
List of box office score data with date, city, venue, attendance, gross, references
Date (1979)	City	Venue	Attendance	Gross	Ref(s)
April 3	Tacoma, United States	UPS Memorial Field House	4,200	$35,158	
April 5	San Rafael, United States	Marin Veterans Memorial Auditorium	2,028	$16,974	
May 7	Pittsburgh, United States	Stanley Theatre	3,697	$30,058	
May 13	Boston, United States	Orpheum Theatre	2,000	$28,729	
July 10	Corpus Christi, United States	Memorial Coliseum	6,113	$45,985	
July 15	Midland, United States	Chaparral Center	4,076	$33,581	
August 11	Asbury Park, United States	Convention Hall	3,946	$35,652	
August 12	New Haven, United States	Coliseum	7,400	$60,750	
September 27	Bismarck, United States	Civic Center	6,119	$52,529	
September 28	Rapid City, United States	Rushmore Plaza	6,831	$57,946	
September 29	Billings, United States	MetraPark Arena	9,151	$77,516	

== Personnel ==
- Eddie Van Halen – guitar and background vocals
- David Lee Roth – lead vocals, acoustic guitar on "Ice Cream Man"
- Michael Anthony – bass, backing vocals
- Alex Van Halen – drums
