= Fair Warning Tour =

1981 concert tour by Van Halen

- Tour by Van Halen
- Poster to the second concert in Boston
- Location: North America
- Associated album: Fair Warning
- Start date: May 12, 1981
- End date: October 25, 1981
- No. of shows: 81

Van Halen concert chronology
- World Invasion Tour (1980); Fair Warning Tour (1981); Hide Your Sheep Tour (1982–1983)

The Fair Warning Tour was a concert tour by the American hard rock band Van Halen in support of their fourth studio album Fair Warning.

== Background ==
The tour began with two to three night performances with the band being focused on performing only in North America. The June 11, 12 and 13 shows in Oakland were filmed, creating music videos for "Unchained", "So This is Love?" and "Hear About It Later", though Roth stated in an interview that the two nights of filming were a disaster and the footage from the third show had to be scrapped as a result. The band concluded their tour as an opening act for two shows with the Rolling Stones at Tangerine Bowl on October 24 and 25.

== Reception ==
Don Adair from The Spokesman-Review gave the performance he attended in Spokane a positive review. He began his review, stating that Van Halen was music to be enjoyed on the most elemental levels, citing it as flashy, showy, brazen hormone rock and that it was pointless to pass judgement on Van Halen. He acknowledged the stage design, adding that there was follow-spots lighting the band from the rear of the stage with others from out front and around the drum stand - noting it as the drum kit lit up like an encounter from the third kind. He continued on the speakers hanging from the coliseum's ceiling and front wall of the building adjacent to the stage with amplifiers behind the band, comparing it to a mountain range in aluminum. He would criticize the acoustics though as it did muddle Eddie Van Halen's playing. He praised David Lee Roth as still having the moves and hitting home with unerring accuracy, but had criticized his voice as being only average, stating his trademark squeal should have been forgotten long ago. He concluded his review, stating that the sold out audience got what they paid for.

Jim Bruce from The Windsor Star who attended the Cobo Arena show in Detroit, opening his review, noting on how all three of the shows that had sold out had translated to 50,000 fans aged between 15 and 25, with tremendous amounts of emotion given when the band had arrived on stage to which he described their entrance as if they appeared in a blaze of flashing light, adding that he thought Armageddon had arrived. He praised all four of the members in the band, citing them as proven master musicians - also referring to Eddie Van Halen as exceptionally fine lead guitarist. He concluded his review, stating that the audience at the conclusion of the show left with smiles on their faces instead of chips on their shoulders.

Jennifer Towell from The Montreal Gazette opened her review, noting on how the band showed everything in agreement to a banner fans made which declared: "Disco Sucks". She added that the noise level wasn't no accident as the band had brought more than 100 speakers to produce the sound that in comparison, had outblasted any record banned on the regular family stereo. She praised Eddie and Alex's musical accompaniment, saying it was the perfect complement to Roth's "sexually immodest gyrations".

== Tour dates ==
List of 1981 concerts, showing date, city, country and venue
Date	City	Country	Venue
May 12, 1981	Halifax	Canada	Halifax Metro Centre
May 15, 1981	Providence	United States	Providence Civic Center
May 16, 1981	Portland	United States	Cumberland County Civic Center
May 17, 1981	Glens Falls	United States	Glens Falls Civic Center
May 18, 1981	Rochester	United States	Rochester Community War Memorial Arena
May 20, 1981	Charleston	United States	Charleston Civic Center
May 22, 1981	Louisville	United States	Freedom Hall
May 23, 1981	Dayton	United States	Hara Arena
May 24, 1981	Kalamazoo	United States	Wings Stadium
May 27, 1981	Edmonton	Canada	Northlands Coliseum
May 28, 1981	Calgary	Canada	Stampede Corral
May 31, 1981	Spokane	United States	Spokane Coliseum
June 2, 1981	Vancouver	Canada	Pacific Coliseum
June 4, 1981	Seattle	United States	Seattle Center Coliseum
June 5, 1981	Seattle	United States	Seattle Center Coliseum
June 8, 1981	Portland	United States	Veterans Memorial Coliseum
June 9, 1981	Portland	United States	Veterans Memorial Coliseum
June 11, 1981	Oakland	United States	Oakland Arena
June 12, 1981	Oakland	United States	Oakland Arena
June 13, 1981	Oakland	United States	Oakland Arena
June 16, 1981	Las Vegas	United States	Aladdin Theatre
June 18, 1981	Fresno	United States	Selland Arena
June 19, 1981	Los Angeles	United States	Los Angeles Memorial Sports Arena
June 20, 1981	Inglewood	United States	The Forum
June 21, 1981	Inglewood	United States	The Forum
July 2, 1981	Milwaukee	United States	MECCA Arena
July 3, 1981	Detroit	United States	Cobo Arena
July 4, 1981	Detroit	United States	Cobo Arena
July 5, 1981	Detroit	United States	Cobo Arena
July 7, 1981	Saint Paul	United States	St. Paul Civic Center
July 9, 1981	Indianapolis	United States	Market Square Arena
July 10, 1981	Chicago	United States	International Amphitheatre
July 11, 1981	Chicago	United States	International Amphitheatre
July 12, 1981	Madison	United States	Dane County Veterans Memorial Coliseum
July 14, 1981	Pittsburgh	United States	Pittsburgh Civic Arena
July 16, 1981	New Haven	United States	New Haven Coliseum
July 17, 1981	New York City	United States	Madison Square Garden
July 18, 1981	Uniondale	United States	Nassau Coliseum
July 20, 1981	Philadelphia	United States	Spectrum
July 21, 1981	Philadelphia	United States	Spectrum
July 22, 1981	Philadelphia	United States	Spectrum
July 24, 1981	Boston	United States	Boston Garden
July 25, 1981	Boston	United States	Boston Garden
July 27, 1981	Roanoke	United States	Roanoke Civic Center
July 28, 1981	Landover	United States	Capital Centre
July 29, 1981	Landover	United States	Capital Centre
July 31, 1981	Buffalo	United States	Buffalo Memorial Auditorium
August 2, 1981	Richfield	United States	Richfield Coliseum
August 3, 1981	Richfield	United States	Richfield Coliseum
August 4, 1981	Toronto	Canada	Maple Leaf Gardens
August 5, 1981	Montreal	Canada	Montreal Forum
August 18, 1981	Pembroke Pines	United States	Hollywood Sportatorium
August 19, 1981	Lakeland	United States	Lakeland Civic Center
August 22, 1981	Atlanta	United States	Omni Coliseum
August 23, 1981	Knoxville	United States	Knoxville Civic Coliseum
August 24, 1981	Charlotte	United States	Charlotte Coliseum
August 25, 1981	Greensboro	United States	Greensboro Coliseum
August 27, 1981	Hampton	United States	Hampton Coliseum
August 29, 1981	Cincinnati	United States	Riverfront Coliseum
August 30, 1981	Nashville	United States	Nashville Municipal Auditorium
August 31, 1981	Birmingham	United States	Jefferson Civic Center
September 1, 1981	Memphis	United States	Mid-South Coliseum
September 3, 1981	Huntsville	United States	Von Braun Civic Center
September 4, 1981	Jackson	United States	Mississippi Coliseum
September 5, 1981	Biloxi	United States	Mississippi Coast Coliseum
September 6, 1981	Baton Rouge	United States	Riverside Centroplex
September 8, 1981	Shreveport	United States	Hirsch Memorial Coliseum
September 10, 1981	Dallas	United States	Reunion Arena
September 11, 1981	Dallas	United States	Reunion Arena
September 12, 1981	Houston	United States	Sam Houston Coliseum
September 13, 1981	Houston	United States	Sam Houston Coliseum
September 28, 1981	Phoenix	United States	Arizona Veterans Memorial Coliseum
September 29, 1981	San Diego	United States	San Diego Sports Arena
October 2, 1981	Austin	United States	Frank Erwin Center
October 3, 1981	Norman	United States	Lloyd Noble Center
October 6, 1981	Albuquerque	United States	Tingley Coliseum
October 7, 1981	El Paso	United States	El Paso County Coliseum
October 9, 1981	San Antonio	United States	San Antonio Convention Center
October 15, 1981	Tulsa	United States	Tulsa Assembly Center
October 16, 1981	Valley Center	United States	Kansas Coliseum
October 17, 1981	Kansas City	United States	Kemper Arena
October 18, 1981	St. Louis	United States	Checkerdome
October 20, 1981	Omaha	United States	Omaha Civic Auditorium
October 21, 1981	Cedar Rapids	United States	Five Seasons Arena
October 24, 1981	Orlando	United States	Tangerine Bowl
October 25, 1981	Orlando	United States	Tangerine Bowl

=== Box office score data ===
List of box office score data with date, city, venue, attendance, gross, references
Date (1981)	City	Venue	Attendance	Gross	Ref(s)
July 12	Madison, United States	Coliseum	8,346	$71,886	
July 14	Pittsburgh, United States	Civic Arena	13,374	$129,052	
July 16	New Haven, United States	Coliseum	9,832	$92,640	
July 20–22	Philadelphia, United States	Spectrum	36,339	$355,380	
July 24–25	Boston, United States	Garden	24,200	$249,946	
July 28	Indianapolis, United States	Market Square Arena	15,500	$126,250	
August 19	Lakeland, United States	Civic Center	10,000	$95,000	
August 29	Cincinnati, United States	Coliseum	9,897	$98,679	
August 30	Nashville, United States	Municipal Auditorium	9,055	$80,603	
August 31	Birmingham, United States	Civic Center	9,542	$82,978	
September 1	Memphis, United States	Coliseum	10,369	$98,506	
September 4	Jackson, United States	Coliseum	8,297	$78,822	
October 2	Austin, United States	Frank Erwin Center	17,617	$104,734	
October 15	Tulsa, United States	Assembly Center	7,157	$67,458	
October 18	St. Louis, United States	Checkerdome	14,082	$127,395	

== Personnel ==
- Eddie Van Halen – guitar, backing vocals, keyboards
- David Lee Roth – lead vocals, acoustic guitar
- Michael Anthony – bass, backing vocals, keyboards
- Alex Van Halen – drums
