= Capital Centre (Maryland) =

Arena in Landover, Maryland, U.S.

- Cap Centre; The Cap; The Centre
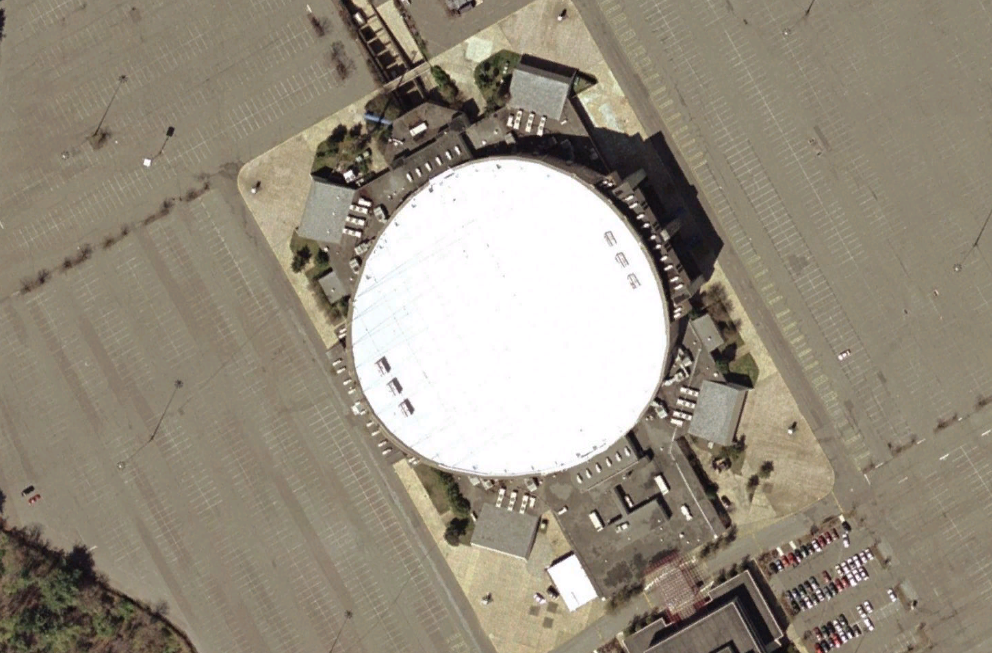
- April 2002, eight months prior to demolition

- Location in the United States Location in Maryland
- Interactive map of Capital Centre
- Former names: USAir Arena (1993–1996); US Airways Arena (1996–1997)
- Address: 1 Harry S. Truman Drive
- Location: Landover, Maryland, U.S.
- Coordinates: 38°54′9″N 76°50′49″W
- Owner: Washington Sports & Entertainment (Abe Pollin)
- Operator: Washington Sports & Entertainment (Abe Pollin)
- Capacity: Basketball: 19,035 (1974–1989); 18,756 (1989–1997); Ice hockey: 18,130
- Surface: Multi-surface

Construction
- Groundbreaking: August 24, 1972
- Opened: December 2, 1973
- Closed: March 23, 2002
- Demolished: December 15, 2002
- Cost: $18 million ($139 million in 2025)
- Architect: Shaver Partnership
- Structural engineer: Geiger-Berger and Associates
- General contractor: George Hyman; Construction Co.

Tenants
- Capital/Washington Bullets/Wizards (NBA) (1973–1997); Washington Capitals (NHL) (1974–1997); Georgetown Hoyas (NCAA) (1981–1997); Maryland Arrows (NLL) (1974–1975); Washington/Maryland Commandos (AFL) (1987, 1989); Washington Wave (MILL) (1987–1989); Washington Warthogs (CISL) (1994–1997); Washington Power (NLL) (2002)

The Capital Centre (later USAir Arena and US Airways Arena) was an indoor arena in Landover, Maryland, United States, a suburb east of Washington, D.C. The seating capacity was 18,756 for basketball and 18,130 for hockey.

Opened in late 1973, it closed in March 2002, and was demolished that December.

== History ==
In 1964, Abe Pollin became the owner of the National Basketball Association's Baltimore Bullets and wanted to reconnect the sport to the DC region. Pollin announced plans to build a $18 million multi-purpose sports arena in the Maryland beltway in 1972. Ground-breaking of the arena took place on August 24 of that year. The construction lasted for 15 months before the arena opened on December 2, 1973.

It was located just outside (east) of the Capital Beltway (Interstate 495) at exit 16, less than a mile (1.6 km) southeast of what is now FedExField, the home of the Washington Commanders of the National Football League, which opened in 1997. The elevation at street level was approximately 160 feet (50 m) above sea level.

In 1993, the airline USAir purchased the naming rights for the building and the arena became known as USAir Arena. The rename was initially not popular with Washington-area residents. When the airline went through its 1996 rebranding and became US Airways, the name of the arena accordingly changed to US Airways Arena which remained in use until its demolition in December 2002.

== Sports ==
Capital Centre was the primary home of the Washington Bullets of the NBA, the Washington Capitals of the NHL, and Georgetown University men's basketball. All three teams departed for the MCI Center (now Capital One Arena), just north of the National Mall in D.C., when it opened in December 1997.

=== Basketball ===
Capital Centre hosted its first NBA game on December 2, 1973, as the Capital Bullets defeated the Seattle SuperSonics, 98–96 in front of a sellout crowd. During October and November 1973, the Bullets held their home games at nearby Cole Field House on the campus of the University of Maryland in College Park.

The arena hosted games of three NBA Finals; the first was in 1975, when the favored Bullets were swept by the Golden State Warriors. The Bullets returned to the Finals in 1978 and 1979, in tilts against the Seattle SuperSonics. In 1978, the Bullets won Games 2 and 6 at the Capital Centre on their way to claiming the championship, taking Games 4 and 7 in Seattle. The Bullets won the Finals' opener at home in 1979, but then dropped four straight to the Sonics, who celebrated their only NBA title after the Game 5 victory at Capital Centre. Footage of past Washington Bullets games held at the Capital Centre was used in the 1979 comedy film The Fish That Saved Pittsburgh. The arena was also the host of the 1980 NBA All-Star Game. The Washington Wizards were known as the Bullets until 1997 and played the first five home games of the 1997–98 season at the old arena under their new name. The final Bullets/Wizards game at the Capital Centre was on November 29, 1997, where they lost 83–88 against the Chicago Bulls.

==== College basketball ====
The ACC men's basketball tournament was held at Capital Centre in 1976, 1981, and 1987. On December 5, 1981, the Georgetown Hoyas men's basketball team played against San Diego State with a 71–53 win in their first game at the arena after moving from the McDonough Gymnasium. They played at the arena as their primary home until their last game at the venue on November 25, 1997, against Cleveland State.

=== Ice hockey ===
The arena also hosted the NHL's Washington Capitals. The Capitals joined the league alongside the Kansas City Scouts as an expansion team for the 1974-75 season, making this arena their first home. The Capitals hosted the 1982 NHL All-Star Game. The arena also was home to a few noteworthy NHL playoff games, including the Easter Epic in 1987. The Capitals played their final game at the venue in a 6–5 loss against the Montreal Canadiens on November 26, 1997.

=== Other tenants ===
The Washington/Maryland Commandos of the Arena Football League also called the arena home in 1987 and 1989. The Maryland Arrows, Washington Wave, and Washington Power lacrosse teams used the arena, as did the Washington Warthogs CISL professional indoor soccer team.

=== Fighting ===
The Muhammad Ali vs. Jimmy Young fight for the world heavyweight boxing title was held at the venue on April 30, 1976. A sluggish Ali won a controversial unanimous decision over Young after 15 rounds. A year later, 35-year-old Ali defeated Alfredo Evangelista in another unanimous decision to retain the title on May 16, 1977.

WWF wrestling matches were held at the arena throughout the 1980s and early 90s. The arena hosted WWF's Survivor Series in 1995. Two WCW events were also held at the arena in 1989.

== Concerts ==
The first concert ever held at the Capital Centre was the Allman Brothers Band on December 4, 1973, two nights after the first Bullets game. They were backed up by the James Montgomery Blues Band, who played from 9 P.M. until midnight. The Allman Brothers played until 3:30 A.M.

The Who played there two nights later on December 6, 1973, as part of the debut of their rock opera Quadrophenia. It was festival seating at the concert and there were no seats on the floor as the venue was newly opened and not finished. Lynyrd Skynyrd was the opening act that evening and throughout the tour, performing their landmark debut album. After drummer Keith Moon died in September 1978, The Who returned to the stage in May 1979 and later that year they performed at the Capital Centre on December 13 and 17. During a farewell tour they returned to the Capital Centre for two performances on September 22–23, 1982, the latter date opened by David Johanson.

The Jacksons held 5 concerts at the Capital Centre between 1973 & 1981:

- December 28, 1973 w/ New York City (The Jackson 5 World Tour)
- September 24, 1976 w/ Johnny Taylor, B.T. Express, & Bill Withers (Congressional Black Caucus Benefit Concert)
- June 9, 1979 w/ Sister Sledge (Destiny World Tour)
- July 31 & August 1, 1981 w/ Stacey Lattisaw (Triumph Tour)

Michael Jackson held four sold-out concerts at the Capital Centre in 1988 during the Bad tour. The dates were October 13, 17, 18 and 19, 1988.

Frank Sinatra performed for four shows: April 24, 1974 (aud. 16,500), June 20, 1978 (17,000), May 8, 1987 (13,048), and March 31, 1988 (18,146), with Sammy Davis Jr. on the "Together Again" tour (Dean Martin left the tour shortly before the concert). The second joint concert with Davis (October 6, 1989) was canceled due to Davis's illness.

John Denver played his first of ten concerts at the Capital Centre on April 28, 1974, and his last concert there was June 7, 1991. Between those dates, he performed concerts at the Centre in 1982 (2), 1980 (1), 1978 (1), 1976 (2), and 1975 (2).

Grand Funk Railroad played there May 2, 1974, on their Shinin' On tour, with opening act Wet Willie.

Eric Clapton played two shows there on October 4 & 5, 1974, in support of his album 461 Ocean Boulevard. A recording of the October 4 show exists.

Led Zeppelin sold out every show they ever booked there. The first concert took place on February 10, 1975; 2 years later in 1977, they sold out 4 dates: May 25, 26, 28 and 30.

Pink Floyd played two shows in June 1975 on their Wish You Were Here Tour, available on bootleg, and then again for four sold-out shows after Roger Waters left in October 1987 during their A Momentary Lapse of Reason Tour.

Chicago's performance recorded live at Capital Centre on June 24–26, 1975, was released in 2011's Chicago XXXIV: Live in '75. After releasing its eighth consecutive gold album in just six years, Chicago embarked upon a massive stadium tour in 1975 that is considered to be one of its finest.

The first two volumes of Kiss's retrospective DVD series Kissology included bonus discs of late-1970s shows videotaped at the arena. Kiss first performed on November 30, 1975, supporting their live album Alive; years after that show, it surfaced on various Kiss videos and archives. Kiss returned on December 19, 1976, promoting Rock and Roll Over, and with the Alive II Tour on December 19–20, 1977 supporting their second live album Alive II. Their Dynasty Tour visited the arena on July 7–8, 1979 promoting Dynasty. They returned to the arena after a 13-year absence on October 18, 1992, supporting Revenge with their Revenge Tour. They returned four years later on October 6–7, 1996 for their Alive/Worldwide Tour.

Elvis Presley performed two shows there on Sunday, June 27, 1976, to a total audience of nearly 38,000. Both shows sold out in one day. Ticket prices were $7.50, 10, and 12.50. His last concert at the Capital Centre was on May 22, 1977, during his second-to-last tour, which included 13 other venues. June 26, 1977, at Market Square Arena in Indianapolis, would be his final concert performance. His only other concert in the Washington, D.C., area was on September 27 and 28, 1974, at nearby University of Maryland's Cole Field House, also in Prince George's County.

Rush performed here thirteen times, first in 1976, then on every tour between 1979 through 1996. Their performances on August 22, 1979, September 26, 1980, May 17, 1981, November 29, 1982, September 27, 1984, December 16, 1985, November 30, 1987, December 4, 1991, April 26, 1994, and November 7, 1996, are all available as bootleg recordings.

The arena was home to several Toys for Tots concerts in the late 1970s and early 1980s.

Jethro Tull's performance recorded and filmed live at Capital Centre on November 21, 1977, was released in 2017's Songs From the Wood 40th Anniversary box set. The first four songs' audio was taken from the band's show at the Boston Garden two weeks later because the first reel of the Capital Center audio could not be located.

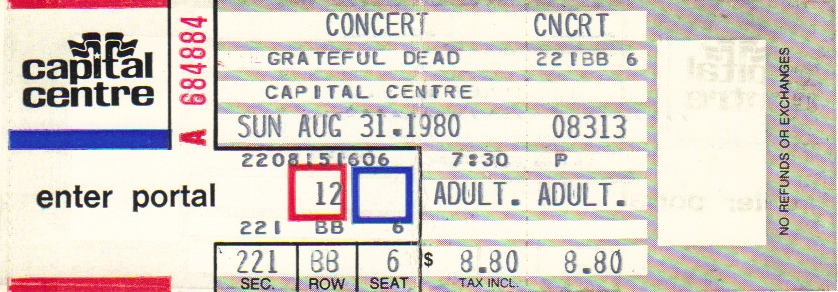
A ticket from a Grateful Dead concert at the arena in 1980.

The Grateful Dead recorded and released three shows performed at the arena: Dick's Picks Volume 20 on September 25, 1976, Terrapin Station (Limited Edition) on March 15, 1990 (on bass guitarist Phil Lesh's 50th birthday), and Spring 1990 on March 16, 1990, the next night. The Grateful Dead played a total of 26 times at the arena from 1974 until 1993. Three more shows were played in 1994 under the new name, USAir arena.

Concert videos of Blue Öyster Cult from the arena on December 27, 1976, have been released on their Live 1976 DVD and on July 14, 1978 Some Enchanted Evening Legacy Edition CD/DVD. Uriah Heep (band) were the opening act for the 1976 show and Cheap Trick for the 1978 show.

Parliament-Funkadelic headlined numerous sold-out shows at the venue, mainly during the years 1976 to 1983.

The Eagles' performance from March 1977 was released in 2013's History of the Eagles. They had previously played at the arena in July 1975, opening for The Rolling Stones.

The Steve Miller Band's August 3, 1977, performance at the Capital Centre was released in May 2021 as the live album Live! Breaking Ground August 3, 1977.

Queen performed at the arena on three occasions, first during the News of the World Tour in November 1977, then as part of the Jazz Tour the following year. In July 1982, the band returned to the venue for the North American leg of the Hot Space Tour, with Billy Squier as the opening act.

AC/DC performed several concerts of their tours in the arena, such as the Let There Be Rock Tour (opening for Kiss on Dec. 19, 1977), If You Want Blood Tour (1979), Back in Black Tour (1980), For Those About to Rock Tour (1981), Flick of the Switch Tour (1983), Blow Up Your Video World Tour (1988) and The Razors Edge World Tour (1990). The shows of December 20–21, 1981 were filmed and several tracks from these shows are included in their DVD set Plug Me In.

Van Halen performed several shows at the arena: their debut tour on August 12, 1978, opening for Ted Nugent, the World Invasion Tour on May 1, 1980, promoting Women and Children First (1980), the Fair Warning Tour on July 28–29, 1981 supporting Fair Warning (1981), and the Hide Your Sheep Tour on October 11–12, 1982 for Diver Down (1982). The second night of the Hide Your Sheep Tour was filmed at the arena. The 1984 Tour on March 25–26, 1984 for 1984 (1984) and the 5150 Tour on August 8–9, 1986 for 5150 (1986). The 5150 Tour was the first to feature Sammy Hagar as David Lee Roth's replacement. Van Halen returned to the arena after a five-year absence on October 17, 1991, supporting their Grammy winning album For Unlawful Carnal Knowledge (1991).

Bruce Springsteen held 14 concerts at the Capital Centre between 1978 and 1992:

- August 15 and November 2, 1978 (Darkness Tour)
- November 23 and 24, 1980 and August 5 and 7, 1981 (The River Tour)
- August 25, 26, 28 and 29, 1984 (Born in the U.S.A. Tour)
- April 4 and 5, 1988 (Tunnel of Love Express Tour)
- August 25 and 26, 1992 (Bruce Springsteen 1992–1993 World Tour)

Billy Joel played at the Centre on October 3, 1978, during the "52nd Street (album)" tour. Playing such hits as Movin' Out (Anthony's Song), The Entertainer and Vienna.

Styx performed here four times between 1978 and 1983. Their April 1981 performance at the venue from the Paradise Theatre tour is available on bootleg.

A recording of The New Barbarians' concert on May 5, 1979, during the band's only concert tour ever, was released as Buried Alive: Live in Maryland.

The Bee Gees performed two sold-out concerts here on September 24–25, 1979, as part of their Spirits Having Flown Tour.

The Rolling Stones played three sold-out shows at the arena on December 7–9, 1981, in support of Tattoo You, the year's highest-grossing tour, with ticket sales of $50 million. Their 1982 live album Still Life, included three songs taken from the Largo concerts: "Let Me Go" (December 8), "Twenty Flight Rock," and "Going to a Go-Go" (both December 9). They had previously played at the venue in 1975 (July 1 & 2).

REO Speedwagon performed here in 1981 and 1982.

The cult video documentary short Heavy Metal Parking Lot was shot by Jeff Krulik and John Heyn on May 31, 1986, in the arena's parking lot, comically documenting thousands of heavy metal fans as they partied before a Judas Priest concert (with special guests Dokken). (The parking lot itself was divided into four sections, with patriotic emblems, to aid patrons in remembering where they parked after an event: Liberty Bell, Capitol, Eagle, and Stars and Stripes.)

On July 4, 1987, the venue played host to a benefit and tribute concert for Vietnam vets and organized by "Welcome Home", an organization that aids and supports Vietnam vets. The star-studded event included Anita Baker, James Ingram, Crosby, Stills & Nash, The Four Tops, Frankie Valli, James Brown, John Fogerty, John Sebastian, John Ritter, Kris Kristofferson, Linda Ronstadt, Neil Diamond, George Carlin, Richie Havens, John Voight, and Stevie Wonder. The show was broadcast later that evening on HBO.

Local Washington, D.C.–based go-go bands (such as Rare Essence, Chuck Brown and the Soul Searchers, and E.U.) performed annually at the "Back to School" concerts held at the Capital Center, including the Go Go Live at the Capital Centre concert in 1987.

George Michael, in the midst of becoming the highest selling artist in America in 1988, brought his worldwide "Faith Tour" to the Capital Centre on August 6 and 7, 1988.

Madonna's Blond Ambition World Tour included two concerts at the Capital Centre on June 8 and 9, 1990.

Red Hot Chili Peppers on February 14, 1996, performed their only show in the area with then guitarist Dave Navarro at USAir Arena during their One Hot Minute. The show also marked the only time the band played the venue and it was also their biggest show ever in the area at that point having played smaller venues on previous tour stops. The show was originally scheduled for December 10, 1995 but was postponed due to drummer Chad Smith injuring his arm. The Rentals and Silverchair opened the show.

The Smashing Pumpkins played their last concert with late touring keyboardist Jonathan Melvoin at the arena on July 10, 1996, two days before Melvoin's death. Drummer Jimmy Chamberlin also played his last show for two years with the band as he was fired following Melvoin's death due to his own drug problems.

The final concert at the venue was an Aerosmith performance on January 3, 1998, as part of the Nine Lives Tour. The band had previously performed twelve times at the venue in 1975, 1976, 1977, 1978, 1980, 1983, 1986, 1987, 1989, 1990, 1993, and 1994.

== Other events ==
Other events there included monster truck shows, Arenacross shows, and tractor pulling shows.

The arena also hosted family-friendly events, such as the Harlem Globetrotters and Ice Capades. In the late 1970s, the arena hosted a circus named Circus America, which was created by Abe Pollin to compete with Feld Entertainment's Ringling Bros. and Barnum & Bailey Circus.

Numerous graduation ceremonies for high schools in Prince George's County were also hosted here.

On January 21, 1985, the arena hosted inaugural festivities celebrating President Ronald Reagan's second inauguration. Reagan, Vice President George H. W. Bush, and their wives attended. Bitterly cold weather had forced the cancellation of the day's inaugural parade in Washington, D.C. As a result, the alternative indoor event at the Capital Centre afforded the parade's expected participants—including an estimated 9,000 students—an opportunity to perform for the president.

On January 19, 1993, a cast including Michael Jackson, Barbra Streisand, Elton John, the Alvin Ailey Dance Troupe, comedians Chevy Chase and Bill Cosby, and actors Jack Lemmon and James Earl Jones, performed at the 42nd Presidential Inaugural Gala in Bill Clinton's honor. A specially re-formed Fleetwood Mac performed "Don't Stop", Clinton's campaign song.

== Demolition ==
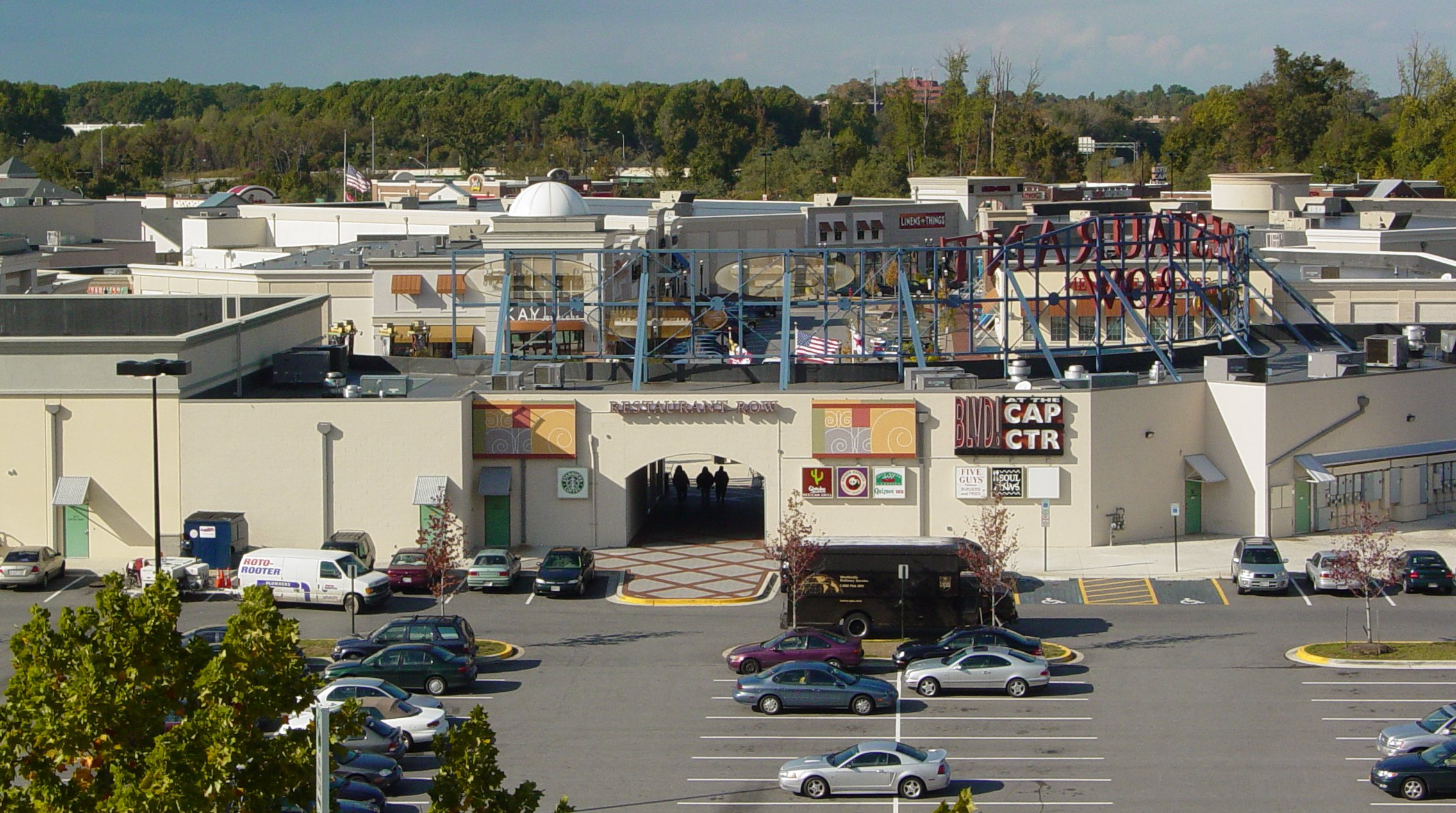
The Boulevard at the Capital Centre was built on the site where the arena had stood.

The Capital Centre arena was imploded on December 15, 2002, by Controlled Demolition, Inc. It was replaced by The Boulevard at the Capital Centre, a town center-style shopping mall that opened in Landover in 2003, which was also demolished July 2019 to make way for Carillon, a new lifestyle-oriented mixed-use development on the same site.

== Legacy ==
Opened in late 1973, the Capital Centre was the first indoor arena to have a video replay screen on its center-hung scoreboard. The four-sided projection video screen was known as the "Telscreen" (or "Telescreen") and predated the Diamond Vision video screen at Dodger Stadium by seven years. It was also the first indoor arena to be built with luxury boxes, and a computerized turnstile system.

== See also ==
- Hyperboloid structure
- Tensile architecture
- Thin-shell structure

Events and tenants
Preceded by Baltimore Civic Center	Home of the Washington Bullets; 1973–1997	Succeeded by Capital One Arena
Preceded by first venue	Home of the Washington Capitals; 1974–1997	Succeeded by Capital One Arena
Preceded by The Forum	Host of the NHL All-Star Game; 1982	Succeeded by Nassau Coliseum
