= Hide Your Sheep Tour =

1982–1983 concert tour by Van Halen

- Tour by Van Halen
- Poster to the concert in Toronto, Canada
- Location: North America; South America
- Associated album: Diver Down
- Start date: July 14, 1982
- End date: May 29, 1983
- Legs: 4
- No. of shows: 93

Van Halen concert chronology
- Fair Warning Tour (1981); Hide Your Sheep Tour (1982–1983); 1984 Tour (1984)

The Hide Your Sheep Tour was a 1982-83 concert tour by the American hard rock band Van Halen in support of their fifth studio album Diver Down.

The tour began as a North American-only event with dates scheduled from July 14 to December 11, 1982. The band subsequently accepted an offer to make their South American debut with a month of dates dubbed the No Problem Tour. After that wrapped up, the band concluded the tour with a May 29, 1983, performance in San Bernardino, California, where they headlined "Heavy Metal Day" of the US Festival with Ozzy Osbourne, Judas Priest, Scorpions, Quiet Riot, Triumph, and Mötley Crüe. They were paid a record-setting $1.5 million for a single performance at the US Festival.

During this tour, Eddie Van Halen began to use Kramer guitars under an early-1982 endorsement deal, one with a custom double neck. He also tested Floyd D. Rose's early double locking tremolo system, which was modified to include fine tuners at the recommendation of Eddie Van Halen, culminating in the double-locking Floyd Rose tremolo with fine tuners released in 1983.

Relations between the members of the band were beginning to hit an all-time low due to the constant partying, which resulted in the band arguing with one another and creating grudges.

== Reception ==
Pete Bishop from the Pittsburgh Press gave Van Halen's performance a mixed review. He praised Roth’s vocals but said he gave an "obnoxious, disgusting exhibition" that the band did not need. He reported pre-show problems and that during the show some fans climbed onstage while others threw objects on stage. He praised the entertainment as in best physical rock 'n' roll tradition. He also praised the lighting, such as the strobe lights at the base of Alex Van Halen's drum platform, but criticized the audio, saying that Roth's vocals were drowned in a muddle of bass and drums that made it almost impossible to recognize songs.

Dave Stuckrath from the Lakeland Ledger gave the performance he attended in Lakeland a poor rating, opening his review by stating that the band was more spectacle than music. He criticized the set as being poorly paced and uneven - only to be saved by their pyrotechnic lighting effects. He also added about the deafening wall of sound which rendered the music and lyrics meaningless than their records. He noted that a Van Halen concert was flashy but was musically and emotionally empty, having to rely on gimmicks and Roth's usage of obscene words and gestures. According to Stuckrath, they did nothing but "degrade rock 'n' roll's past, including that there was nothing original about their music and behavior. He concluded his review, saying that the audience had missed the opening acts which he said were the most entertaining part of the evening. The paper later published a letter by Candy Blank, a fan at the concert, who slammed Stuckrath's criticism, said the crowd was hardly bored, and called the music "fantastic".

== Tour dates ==
List of 1982 concerts
Date	City	Country	Venue
July 14, 1982	Augusta	United States	Augusta Civic Center
July 16, 1982	Greensboro	United States	Greensboro Coliseum
July 17, 1982	Charlotte	United States	Charlotte Coliseum
July 18, 1982	Columbia	United States	Carolina Coliseum
July 20, 1982	Knoxville	United States	Knoxville Civic Coliseum
July 22, 1982	Birmingham	United States	Jefferson Civic Center
July 23, 1982	Jackson	United States	Mississippi Coliseum
July 24, 1982	Biloxi	United States	Mississippi Coast Coliseum
July 27, 1982	Nashville	United States	Nashville Municipal Auditorium
July 29, 1982	Trotwood	United States	Hara Arena
July 30, 1982	Louisville	United States	Freedom Hall
July 31, 1982	Fort Wayne	United States	Allen County War Memorial Coliseum
August 3, 1982	Rockford	United States	Rockford MetroCenter
August 4, 1982	Des Moines	United States	Veterans Memorial Auditorium
August 6, 1982	St. Louis	United States	Checkerdome
August 7, 1982	Kansas City	United States	Kemper Arena
August 8, 1982	Omaha	United States	Omaha Civic Auditorium
August 10, 1982	Saint Paul	United States	St. Paul Civic Center
August 11, 1982	Madison	United States	Dane County Veterans Memorial Coliseum
August 13, 1982	Detroit	United States	Cobo Arena
August 14, 1982	Detroit	United States	Cobo Arena
August 15, 1982	Detroit	United States	Cobo Arena
August 17, 1982	Milwaukee	United States	MECCA Arena
August 18, 1982	Green Bay	United States	Brown County Veterans Memorial Arena
August 19, 1982	Chicago	United States	UIC Pavilion
August 21, 1982	Richfield	United States	Richfield Coliseum
September 1, 1982	Portland	United States	Portland Memorial Coliseum
September 2, 1982	Seattle	United States	Seattle Center Coliseum
September 3, 1982	Vancouver	Canada	Pacific Coliseum
September 5, 1982	Fresno	United States	Selland Arena
September 7, 1982	Phoenix	United States	Arizona Veterans Memorial Coliseum
September 9, 1982	Inglewood	United States	The Forum
September 10, 1982	Inglewood	United States	The Forum
September 11, 1982	Inglewood	United States	The Forum
September 14, 1982	Daly City	United States	Cow Palace
September 15, 1982	Daly City	United States	Cow Palace
September 17, 1982	Las Vegas	United States	Aladdin Theatre
September 19, 1982	El Paso	United States	El Paso County Coliseum
September 21, 1982	Oklahoma City	United States	Myriad Convention Center
September 22, 1982	Tulsa	United States	Tulsa Assembly Center
September 23, 1982	Houston	United States	The Summit
September 24, 1982	Houston	United States	The Summit
September 25, 1982	Shreveport	United States	Hirsch Memorial Coliseum
~~September 26, 1982~~	~~Casper~~	United States	~~Casper Events Center~~
October 7, 1982	New Haven	United States	New Haven Coliseum
October 8, 1982	New York City	United States	Madison Square Garden
October 9, 1982	Syracuse	United States	Carrier Dome
October 11, 1982	Landover	United States	Capital Centre
October 12, 1982	Landover	United States	Capital Centre
October 19, 1982	Philadelphia	United States	Spectrum
October 20, 1982	Philadelphia	United States	Spectrum
October 22, 1982	Worcester	United States	Worcester Centrum
October 23, 1982	Worcester	United States	Worcester Centrum
October 24, 1982	Worcester	United States	Worcester Centrum
October 26, 1982	Toronto	Canada	Maple Leaf Gardens
October 27, 1982	Montreal	Canada	Montreal Forum
October 30, 1982	Roanoke	United States	Roanoke Civic Center
October 31, 1982	Hampton	United States	Hampton Coliseum
November 1, 1982	Pittsburgh	United States	Pittsburgh Civic Arena
November 3, 1982	Atlanta	United States	Omni Coliseum
November 5, 1982	Cincinnati	United States	Riverfront Coliseum
~~November 6, 1982~~	~~Lexington~~	United States	~~Rupp Arena~~
November 7, 1982	Chattanooga	United States	UTC Arena
November 13, 1982	Uniondale	United States	Nassau Coliseum
November 14, 1982	East Rutherford	United States	Brendan Byrne Arena
November 15, 1982	East Rutherford	United States	Brendan Byrne Arena
November 18, 1982	Dallas	United States	Reunion Arena
November 19, 1982	Dallas	United States	Reunion Arena
November 20, 1982	Austin	United States	Frank Erwin Center
November 22, 1982	San Antonio	United States	San Antonio Convention Center
November 24, 1982	Valley Center	United States	Kansas Coliseum
November 26, 1982	Baton Rouge	United States	Riverside Centroplex
November 28, 1982	Mobile	United States	Mobile Municipal Auditorium
November 29, 1982	Huntsville	United States	Von Braun Civic Center
November 30, 1982	Asheville	United States	Asheville Civic Center
December 2, 1982	Memphis	United States	Mid-South Coliseum
December 4, 1982	Johnson City	United States	Freedom Hall Civic Center
December 5, 1982	Raleigh	United States	Reynolds Coliseum
December 7, 1982	Lakeland	United States	Lakeland Civic Center
December 9, 1982	Pembroke Pines	United States	Hollywood Sportatorium
December 10, 1982	Pembroke Pines	United States	Hollywood Sportatorium
December 11, 1982	Jacksonville	United States	Jacksonville Coliseum

List of 1983 concerts
Date	City	Country	Venue
January 14, 1983	Caracas	Venezuela	Poliedro de Caracas
January 15, 1983	Caracas	Venezuela	Poliedro de Caracas
January 16, 1983	Caracas	Venezuela	Poliedro de Caracas
January 21, 1983	São Paulo	Brazil	Ginásio do Ibirapuera
January 22, 1983	São Paulo	Brazil	Ginásio do Ibirapuera
January 23, 1983	São Paulo	Brazil	Ginásio do Ibirapuera
January 26, 1983	Rio de Janeiro	Brazil	Ginásio do Maracanãzinho
January 27, 1983	Rio de Janeiro	Brazil	Ginásio do Maracanãzinho
January 29, 1983	Belo Horizonte	Brazil	Mineirão
February 1, 1983	Porto Alegre	Brazil	Gigantinho
February 2, 1983	Porto Alegre	Brazil	Gigantinho
February 5, 1983	Montevideo	Uruguay	Cilindro Municipal
February 11, 1983	Buenos Aires	Argentina	Estadio Obras Sanitarias
February 12, 1983	Buenos Aires	Argentina	Estadio Obras Sanitarias
May 29, 1983 (Note: The May 29, 1983, concert was a part of Heavy Metal Day at US Festival.)	Devore	United States	Glen Helen Pavilion

=== Box office score data ===
List of box office score data with date, city, venue, attendance, gross, references
Date (1982)	City	Venue	Attendance	Gross	Ref(s)
July 14	Augusta, United States	Civic Center	7,779	$79,755	
July 16	Greensboro, United States	Coliseum	11,498	$119,443	
July 17	Charlotte, United States	Coliseum	12,610	$126,153	
July 18	Columbia, United States	Carolina Coliseum	9,940	$98,922	
July 20	Knoxville, United States	Coliseum	9,752	$99,531	
July 22	Birmingham, United States	Jefferson Civic Center	16,000	$166,000	
July 24	Biloxi, United States	Mississippi Coast Coliseum	14,941	$153,890	
July 30	Louisville, United States	Freedom Hall	17,601	$150,602	
July 31	Fort Wayne, United States	Coliseum	9,000	$84,455	
August 3	Rockford, United States	Metro Centre	8,110	$99,275	
August 4	Des Moines, United States	Memorial Auditorium	10,625	$99,695	
August 11	Madison, United States	Dane County Coliseum	10,100	$94,601	
August 17	Milwaukee, United States	MECCA Arena	8,500	$85,293	
September 1	Portland, United States	Coliseum	11,000	$136,275	
September 2	Seattle, United States	Seattle Center Coliseum	14,906	$149,136	
September 3	Vancouver, Canada	Pacific Coliseum	11,748	$145,789	
September 5	Fresno, United States	Selland Arena	7,200	$69,615	
September 7	Phoenix, United States	Coliseum	15,800	$165,900	
September 9–11	Inglewood, United States	Forum	43,212	$520,717	
September 14–15	San Francisco, United States	Cow Palace	29,000	$325,123	
September 23–24	Houston, United States	Summit	34,096	$321,099	
October 7	New Haven, United States	Coliseum	9,900	$111,719	
October 8	New York City, United States	Madison Square Garden	16,258	$206,896	
October 9	Syracuse, United States	Carrier Dome	30,128	$301,280	
October 19–20	Philadelphia, United States	Spectrum	29,401	$300,474	
October 22–24	Worcester, United States	Centrum	32,636	$364,642	
October 26	Toronto, Canada	Maple Leaf Gardens	14,399	$173,358	
October 30	Roanoke, United States	Civic Center	11,000	$120,744	
October 31	Hampton, United States	Coliseum	13,800	$144,438	
November 5	Cincinnati, United States	Riverfront Coliseum	12,360	$131,383	
November 7	Chattanooga, United States	UTC Arena	9,823	$98,621	
November 13	Uniondale, United States	Nassau Coliseum	13,909	$182,103	
November 14–15	East Rutherford, United States	Brendan Byrne Arena	35,888	$454,122	
November 20	Austin, United States	Frank Erwin Center	13,232	$131,016	
November 22	San Antonio, United States	Convention Center	13,081	$126,799	
December 2	Memphis, United States	Mid-South Coliseum	10,162	$106,115	
December 7	Lakeland, United States	Civic Center	10,000	$107,446	
December 9–10	Miami, United States	Hollywood Sportatorium	21,921	$246,611	
December 11	Jacksonville, United States	Memorial Coliseum	11,628	$127,271	

== Personnel ==
- Eddie Van Halen – guitar, backing vocals
- David Lee Roth – lead vocals, acoustic guitar
- Michael Anthony – bass, backing vocals
- Alex Van Halen – drums
