= 1984 Tour =

1984 concert tour by Van Halen

- Tour by Van Halen
- Poster to the concert in Buffalo, New York
- Location: Europe; North America
- Associated album: 1984
- Start date: January 18, 1984
- End date: September 2, 1984
- Legs: 2
- No. of shows: 101

Van Halen concert chronology
- Hide Your Sheep Tour (1982–1983); 1984 Tour (1984); 5150 Tour (1986)

The 1984 Tour was a concert tour by the American hard rock band Van Halen in support of their sixth studio album 1984.

== Background ==
The stage set which was named "Metropolis" was described as the largest production ever taken on the road by a rock band, which consisted of approximately 175 tons of equipment and special effects which had to be hoisted and operated by a hundred chain motors, eight trucks to transport and five buses with almost 100 people to organize. On the stage were five crane devices that rose and lowered the lighting during the show, and at the conclusion of the show, would turn 90 degrees to spell out the numbers "1984" in bright white colors. The glam metal band Autograph supported Van Halen on a majority of their North American shows. At the time of the final three North American shows, Eddie Van Halen made a guest appearance on the Jacksons' Victory Tour, performing "Beat It" alongside Michael Jackson, when he and the rest of Van Halen were in Irving, Texas. Following the North American leg, the band flew off to Europe to perform on the Monsters of Rock tour which was part of the tour. At the conclusion of the tour, David Lee Roth left Van Halen as relations between him and the other members were at an all-time low.

== Reception ==
Bob Andelman, a reporter from the St. Petersburg Times gave the Lakeland performance a positive review. Alongside his opening statements, he agreed heavily that Eddie Van Halen was the best guitarist working steadily who had knocked 10,000 screaming teenage fans over with his dazzling musical integrity and precision. Aside from the guitarist, Andelman praised the strong performances from Michael Anthony, Alex Van Halen and David Lee Roth, adding that Roth had added color and 'a touch of the circus' to the show. He also enjoyed the setlist, to which he praised the pleasure sensation of "Jump" which he said had caused the floor of the venue to reverberate and shake.

Michael Logan, a critic from The Day who had attended the New Haven concert gave the performance a positive review. He praised the band's sound as unique among heavy metal units due to the dynamics of Eddie Van Halen's guitar playing – but did not leave out Michael Anthony's bass solo, which Logan claimed that he thought Anthony was break-dancing. Logan added that both the lighting system for the show would make 'E.T. blush' and that the release of 1984 was timed to perfection, even though he said that Fair Warning was still his favorite album from the band. He concluded his review by stating the show was spectacle with the mention of the band having put other bands they were competing with to the dust but stated: "But this is 1984 and we're stuck with it."

Ethlie Ann Vare from Billboard who attended the Inglewood performance had stated: "A Van Halen concert is half rock, half vaudeville and half again as loud, raunchy, energetic, flashy and manic as it needs to be. Everything they did, they overdid. The monumental motor-driven lighting trusses looked like a prop from 'V: The Final Battle,' and threw off enough wattage to illuminate three night ballgames."

== Tour dates ==
List of concerts, showing date, city, country and venue
Date	City	Country	Venue
North America
January 18, 1984	Jacksonville	United States	Jacksonville Coliseum
January 20, 1984	Pembroke Pines	United States	Hollywood Sportatorium
January 21, 1984	Pembroke Pines	United States	Hollywood Sportatorium
January 22, 1984	Lakeland	United States	Lakeland Civic Center
January 24, 1984	Little Rock	United States	Barton Coliseum
January 25, 1984	Memphis	United States	Mid-South Coliseum
January 26, 1984	Jackson	United States	Mississippi Coliseum
January 28, 1984	Biloxi	United States	Mississippi Coast Coliseum
January 29, 1984	Birmingham	United States	Jefferson Civic Coliseum
February 1, 1984	Charlotte	United States	Charlotte Coliseum
February 3, 1984	Greensboro	United States	Greensboro Coliseum
February 4, 1984	Roanoke	United States	Roanoke Civic Center
February 5, 1984	Charleston	United States	Charleston Civic Coliseum
February 7, 1984	Trotwood	United States	Hara Arena
February 9, 1984	Louisville	United States	Freedom Hall
February 10, 1984	Knoxville	United States	Knoxville Civic Coliseum
February 11, 1984	Nashville	United States	Nashville Municipal Auditorium
February 12, 1984	Richmond	United States	Richmond Coliseum
February 14, 1984	Charlotte	United States	Charlotte Coliseum
February 15, 1984	Hampton	United States	Hampton Coliseum
February 17, 1984	Columbia	United States	Carolina Coliseum
February 18, 1984	Raleigh	United States	Reynolds Coliseum
February 19, 1984	Augusta	United States	Augusta Civic Center
February 22, 1984	Atlanta	United States	Omni Coliseum
February 23, 1984	Atlanta	United States	Omni Coliseum
March 7, 1984	Pittsburgh	United States	Pittsburgh Civic Arena
March 8, 1984	Cincinnati	United States	Cincinnati Gardens
March 9, 1984	Cincinnati	United States	Cincinnati Gardens
March 11, 1984	Saint Paul	United States	St. Paul Civic Center
March 13, 1984	Rosemont	United States	Rosemont Horizon
March 14, 1984	Richfield	United States	Richfield Coliseum
March 16, 1984	Worcester	United States	Centrum in Worcester
March 17, 1984	Providence	United States	Providence Civic Center
March 18, 1984	Providence	United States	Providence Civic Center
March 20, 1984	Philadelphia	United States	Spectrum
March 21, 1984	Philadelphia	United States	Spectrum
March 22, 1984	Buffalo	United States	Buffalo Memorial Auditorium
March 24, 1984	New Haven	United States	New Haven Coliseum
March 25, 1984	Landover	United States	Capital Centre
March 26, 1984	Landover	United States	Capital Centre
March 29, 1984	Hartford	United States	Hartford Civic Center
March 30, 1984	New York City	United States	Madison Square Garden
March 31, 1984	New York City	United States	Madison Square Garden
April 2, 1984	East Rutherford	United States	Brendan Byrne Arena
April 3, 1984	East Rutherford	United States	Brendan Byrne Arena
April 5, 1984	Detroit	United States	Cobo Arena
April 6, 1984	Detroit	United States	Cobo Arena
April 14, 1984	Uniondale	United States	Nassau Coliseum
April 17, 1984	Toronto	Canada	Maple Leaf Gardens
April 19, 1984	Montreal	Canada	Montreal Forum
April 21, 1984	Quebec City	Canada	Quebec Coliseum
April 25, 1984	Winnipeg	Canada	Winnipeg Arena
April 27, 1984	Calgary	Canada	Olympic Saddledome
April 28, 1984	Edmonton	Canada	Northlands Coliseum
April 30, 1984	Seattle	United States	Seattle Center Coliseum
May 1, 1984	Vancouver	Canada	Pacific Coliseum
May 2, 1984	Portland	United States	Portland Memorial Coliseum
May 4, 1984	Boise	United States	BSU Pavilion
May 5, 1984	Pocatello	United States	Minidome
May 7, 1984	Reno	United States	Lawlor Events Center
May 9, 1984	Daly City	United States	Cow Palace
May 10, 1984	Daly City	United States	Cow Palace
May 11, 1984	Daly City	United States	Cow Palace
May 13, 1984	Inglewood	United States	The Forum
May 14, 1984	Inglewood	United States	The Forum
May 15, 1984	Las Vegas	United States	Thomas & Mack Center
May 17, 1984	Phoenix	United States	Arizona Veterans Memorial Coliseum
May 19, 1984	Phoenix	United States	Arizona Veterans Memorial Coliseum
May 20, 1984	San Diego	United States	San Diego Sports Arena
May 21, 1984	San Diego	United States	San Diego Sports Arena
June 2, 1984	Denver	United States	McNichols Sports Arena
June 3, 1984	Denver	United States	McNichols Sports Arena
June 5, 1984	Salt Lake City	United States	Salt Palace
June 7, 1984	Albuquerque	United States	Tingley Coliseum
June 8, 1984	Albuquerque	United States	Tingley Coliseum
June 10, 1984	Austin	United States	Frank Erwin Center
June 11, 1984	San Antonio	United States	San Antonio Convention Center Arena
June 13, 1984	Baton Rouge	United States	LSU Assembly Center
June 15, 1984	Oklahoma City	United States	Myriad Convention Center
June 16, 1984	Oklahoma City	United States	Myriad Convention Center
June 17, 1984	Valley Center	United States	Britt Brown Arena
June 20, 1984	Kansas City	United States	Kemper Arena
June 21, 1984	Kansas City	United States	Kemper Arena
June 23, 1984	Omaha	United States	Omaha Civic Auditorium
June 24, 1984	Omaha	United States	Omaha Civic Auditorium
June 26, 1984	St. Louis	United States	St. Louis Arena
June 27, 1984	St. Louis	United States	St. Louis Arena
June 29, 1984	Peoria	United States	Peoria Civic Center
June 30, 1984	Fort Wayne	United States	Allen County War Memorial Coliseum
July 1, 1984	Rockford	United States	Rockford MetroCenter
July 3, 1984	Madison	United States	Dane County Veterans Memorial Coliseum
July 5, 1984	Indianapolis	United States	Market Square Arena
July 6, 1984	Indianapolis	United States	Market Square Arena
July 7, 1984	Evansville	United States	Roberts Municipal Stadium
July 10, 1984	Houston	United States	The Summit
July 11, 1984	Houston	United States	The Summit
July 12, 1984	Houston	United States	The Summit
July 14, 1984	Dallas	United States	Reunion Arena
July 15, 1984	Dallas	United States	Reunion Arena
July 16, 1984	Dallas	United States	Reunion Arena
Monsters of Rock
August 18, 1984	Castle Donington	England	Donington Park
August 25, 1984	Stockholm	Sweden	Råsunda Stadium
August 31, 1984	Winterthur	Switzerland	Stadion Schützenwiese
September 1, 1984	Karlsruhe	West Germany	Wildparkstadion
September 2, 1984	Nuremberg	West Germany	Städtisches Stadion

=== Box office score data ===
List of box office score data with date, city, venue, attendance, gross, references
Date (1984)	City	Venue	Attendance	Gross	Ref(s)
June 10	Austin, United States	Frank Erwin Center	15,290	$154,431	

== Personnel ==
- Eddie Van Halen – guitar, backing vocals, keyboards
- David Lee Roth – lead vocals, acoustic guitar
- Michael Anthony – bass, backing vocals, keyboards
- Alex Van Halen – drums
