= Van Halen World Invasion Tour =

1980 concert tour by Van Halen

World Invasion Tour
- Tour by Van Halen
- Poster to the concert in Notre Dame, Indiana
- Location: Europe; North America
- Associated album: Women and Children First
- Start date: March 19, 1980
- End date: November 15, 1980
- Legs: 3
- No. of shows: 124

Van Halen concert chronology
- World Vacation Tour (1979); World Invasion Tour (1980); Fair Warning Tour (1981)

The World Invasion Tour was a concert tour by the American hard rock band Van Halen in support of their third studio album, Women and Children First.

== Background ==
The tour was dubbed the "Party 'til You Die Tour" by the band. The tour is notable for being the first time the band played keyboards live during their shows, which would later play a role on the band's next three studio albums. The band skipped Japan on the tour, focused on playing in other smaller cities in North America, with a month of performances in Europe. Unlike the previous tours, this tour was more successful. During the performance in Cincinnati, Roth was accused of inciting others to violate the fire code when he told the crowd to "light 'em up!", urging them to smoke with the audience lighting both matches and lighters during the song "Light Up the Sky". He was written up and later charged for violating fire codes. He would later break his nose during a television appearance in Italy when he did his famous leap, hitting a light fixture.

During the tour, the band had carried 50 tons of equipment, and 850,000 watts of lighting which Alex Van Halen stated would be in the Guinness Book of World Records. The extensive stage itself featured a plane of multi-colored lights, choreographed with each song performed, with multi-platform stage to the right side where Eddie Van Halen would perform a guitar solo with seven lights pointing at him from behind to create a silhouette effect. Before every show, Van Halen demanded that in their dressing rooms that they'd have two pounds of M&M's with all the brown ones removed.

== Tour dates ==
List of 1980 concerts, showing date, city, country and venue
Date	City	Country	Venue
March 19, 1980	Victoria	Canada	Victoria Memorial Arena
March 21, 1980	Central Point	United States	Compton Arena
March 22, 1980	Eugene	United States	McArthur Court
March 24, 1980	Spokane	United States	Spokane Coliseum
March 25, 1980	Great Falls	United States	Four Seasons Arena
March 26, 1980	Missoula	United States	Adams Field House
March 29, 1980	Fort Collins	United States	Moby Gym
March 30, 1980	Pueblo	United States	Massari Arena
April 2, 1980	Vancouver	Canada	Pacific Coliseum
April 3, 1980	Portland	United States	Portland Memorial Coliseum
April 4, 1980	Seattle	United States	Seattle Center Coliseum
April 5, 1980	Seattle	United States	Seattle Center Coliseum
April 7, 1980	Calgary	Canada	Stampede Corral
April 8, 1980	Edmonton	Canada	Northlands Coliseum
April 11, 1980	Winnipeg	Canada	Winnipeg Arena
April 13, 1980	Saint Paul	United States	St. Paul Civic Center
April 14, 1980	Milwaukee	United States	MECCA Arena
April 15, 1980	Madison	United States	Dane County Veterans Memorial Coliseum
April 24, 1980	Cincinnati	United States	Riverfront Coliseum
April 26, 1980	Detroit	United States	Cobo Arena
April 27, 1980	Detroit	United States	Cobo Arena
April 29, 1980	Richfield	United States	Richfield Coliseum
April 30, 1980	Pittsburgh	United States	Pittsburgh Civic Arena
May 1, 1980	Landover	United States	Capital Centre
May 2, 1980	Binghamton	United States	Broome County Veterans Memorial Arena
May 3, 1980	South Yarmouth	United States	Cape Cod Coliseum
May 5, 1980	Buffalo	United States	Buffalo Memorial Auditorium
May 6, 1980	Rochester	United States	Rochester Community War Memorial Arena
May 7, 1980	Philadelphia	United States	Spectrum
May 8, 1980	Philadelphia	United States	Spectrum
May 9, 1980	New Haven	United States	New Haven Coliseum
May 26, 1980	Geleen	Netherlands	Burgemeester Damen Sportpark (Pinkpop Festival)
May 27, 1980	Ludwigshafen	West Germany	Friedrich-Ebert-Halle
May 29, 1980	Essen	West Germany	Grugahalle
May 30, 1980	Hamburg	West Germany	Ernst-Merck-Halle
May 31, 1980	Cambrai	France	Grottos Palace
June 1, 1980	Caen	France	Caen Expo Hall
June 3, 1980	Paris	France	Palais des Sports
June 4, 1980	Lyon	France	Palais des Sports de Gerland
June 6, 1980	Reims	France	Reims Sports Palace
June 7, 1980	Würzburg	West Germany	Carl Diem Hall
June 8, 1980	Neunkirchen	West Germany	Hemmerleinhalle
June 10, 1980	Düsseldorf	West Germany	Philips Hall
June 11, 1980	Sindelfingen	West Germany	Messehalle
June 14, 1980	Munich	West Germany	Rudi-Sedlmayer-Halle
June 17, 1980	Newcastle	England	Newcastle City Hall
June 18, 1980	Glasgow	Scotland	The Apollo
June 19, 1980	Manchester	England	Manchester Apollo
June 20, 1980	Leicester	England	De Montfort Hall
June 22, 1980	Birmingham	England	Birmingham Odeon
June 23, 1980	London	England	Rainbow Theatre
June 24, 1980	London	England	Rainbow Theatre
July 10, 1980	Kalamazoo	United States	Wings Stadium
July 11, 1980	Toledo	United States	Toledo Sports Arena
July 12, 1980	Fort Wayne	United States	Allen County War Memorial Coliseum
July 13, 1980	Huntington	United States	Huntington Civic Center
July 15, 1980	Montreal	Canada	Montreal Forum
July 16, 1980	Ottawa	Canada	Ottawa Civic Centre
July 17, 1980	London	Canada	London Gardens
July 18, 1980	Toronto	Canada	Maple Leaf Gardens
July 21, 1980	Hampton	United States	Hampton Coliseum
July 22, 1980	Baltimore	United States	Baltimore Civic Center
July 24, 1980	Hartford	United States	Hartford Civic Center
July 25, 1980	Boston	United States	Boston Garden
July 26, 1980	Hempstead	United States	Nassau Coliseum
July 28, 1980	Louisville	United States	Freedom Hall
July 29, 1980	Chicago	United States	International Amphitheatre
July 30, 1980	Indianapolis	United States	Market Square Arena
July 31, 1980	St. Louis	United States	Checkerdome
August 1, 1980	Memphis	United States	Mid-South Coliseum
August 2, 1980	Little Rock	United States	Barton Coliseum
August 4, 1980	Birmingham	United States	Jefferson Civic Center
August 5, 1980	Nashville	United States	Nashville Municipal Auditorium
August 6, 1980	Atlanta	United States	Omni Coliseum
August 8, 1980	Lakeland	United States	Lakeland Civic Center
August 9, 1980	Pembroke Pines	United States	Hollywood Sportatorium
August 10, 1980	Jacksonville	United States	Jacksonville Coliseum
August 11, 1980	North Fort Myers	United States	Lee County Civic Center
August 15, 1980	San Juan	Puerto Rico	Roberto Clemente Coliseum
August 16, 1980	San Juan	Puerto Rico	Roberto Clemente Coliseum
August 22, 1980	Kansas City	United States	Kemper Arena
August 23, 1980	Omaha	United States	Omaha Civic Auditorium
August 24, 1980	Salina	United States	Bicentennial Center
August 26, 1980	Corpus Christi	United States	Corpus Christi Memorial Coliseum
August 27, 1980	San Antonio	United States	San Antonio Convention Center
August 28, 1980	Houston	United States	Sam Houston Coliseum
August 29, 1980	Shreveport	United States	Hirsch Memorial Coliseum
August 30, 1980	Baton Rouge	United States	Riverside Centroplex
September 1, 1980	Mobile	United States	Mobile Municipal Auditorium
September 2, 1980	Jackson	United States	Mississippi Coliseum
September 3, 1980	Beaumont	United States	Fair Park Coliseum
September 4, 1980	Dallas	United States	Reunion Arena
September 6, 1980	Norman	United States	Owen Field (Roklahoma)
September 7, 1980	Amarillo	United States	Amarillo Civic Center
September 8, 1980	Amarillo	United States	Amarillo Civic Center
September 9, 1980	Lubbock	United States	Lubbock Municipal Coliseum
September 10, 1980	Albuquerque	United States	University Arena
September 12, 1980	Denver	United States	McNichols Sports Arena
September 13, 1980	Denver	United States	McNichols Sports Arena
September 15, 1980	Phoenix	United States	Arizona Veterans Memorial Coliseum
September 16, 1980	Tucson	United States	Tucson Community Center
September 18, 1980	Fresno	United States	Selland Arena
September 19, 1980	Los Angeles	United States	Los Angeles Memorial Sports Arena
September 20, 1980	Los Angeles	United States	Los Angeles Memorial Sports Arena
October 3, 1980	Rapid City	United States	Rushmore Plaza Civic Center
October 4, 1980	Bismarck	United States	Bismarck Civic Center
October 6, 1980	Salt Lake City	United States	Salt Palace
October 9, 1980	Oakland	United States	Oakland Arena
October 10, 1980	Oakland	United States	Oakland Arena
October 12, 1980	San Diego	United States	San Diego Sports Arena
October 15, 1980	Sioux Falls	United States	Sioux Falls Arena
October 16, 1980	Des Moines	United States	Des Moines Veterans Memorial Auditorium
October 17, 1980	Lincoln	United States	Pershing Memorial Auditorium
October 19, 1980	Macomb	United States	Western Hall
October 21, 1980	Terre Haute	United States	Hulman Arena
October 22, 1980	Lexington	United States	Rupp Arena
October 24, 1980	Knoxville	United States	Knoxville Civic Coliseum
October 25, 1980	Johnson City	United States	Freedom Hall
October 31, 1980	Macon	United States	Macon Coliseum
November 1, 1980	Augusta	United States	Augusta Civic Center
November 2, 1980	Asheville	United States	Asheville Civic Center
November 5, 1980	Champaign	United States	Assembly Hall
November 6, 1980	Notre Dame	United States	Notre Dame Athletics and Convocation Center
November 7, 1980	Evansville	United States	Roberts Municipal Stadium
November 8, 1980	Huntsville	United States	Von Braun Civic Center
November 11, 1980	Winston-Salem	United States	Winston-Salem Memorial Coliseum
November 12, 1980	Savannah	United States	Savannah Civic Center
November 14, 1980	St. Petersburg	United States	Bayfront Center
November 15, 1980	Lakeland	United States	Lakeland Civic Center

=== Box office score data ===
List of box office score data with date, city, venue, attendance, gross, references
Date (1980)	City	Venue	Attendance	Gross	Ref(s)
July 18	Toronto, Canada	Maple Leaf Gardens	14,955	$150,706	
July 24	Hartford, United States	Civic Center	13,300	$119,151	
July 25	Boston, United States	Boston Gardens	12,000	$118,104	
July 28	Louisville, United States	Freedom Hall	13,436	$105,038	
July 30	Indianapolis, United States	Market Square Arena	14,000	$104,209	
July 31	St. Louis, United States	Checkerdome Theatre	13,320	$117,451	
August 1	Memphis, United States	South Coliseum	10,154	$83,608	
August 4	Birmingham, United States	Jefferson Civic Center	11,146	$93,790	
September 4	Dallas, United States	Reunion Arena	14,177	$127,593	
September 6	Norman, United States	Owen Field	31,611	$410,652	
September 18	Fresno, United States	Selland Arena	7,030	$61,161	
October 9–10	Oakland, United States	Coliseum	23,178	$210,669	

== Personnel ==
- Eddie Van Halen – guitar, backing vocals
- David Lee Roth – lead vocals, acoustic guitar
- Michael Anthony – bass, keyboards, backing vocals
- Alex Van Halen – drums
