= Chaparral Center =

Arena at Midland College in Texas, US

Coordinates: 32.028°N 102.103°W

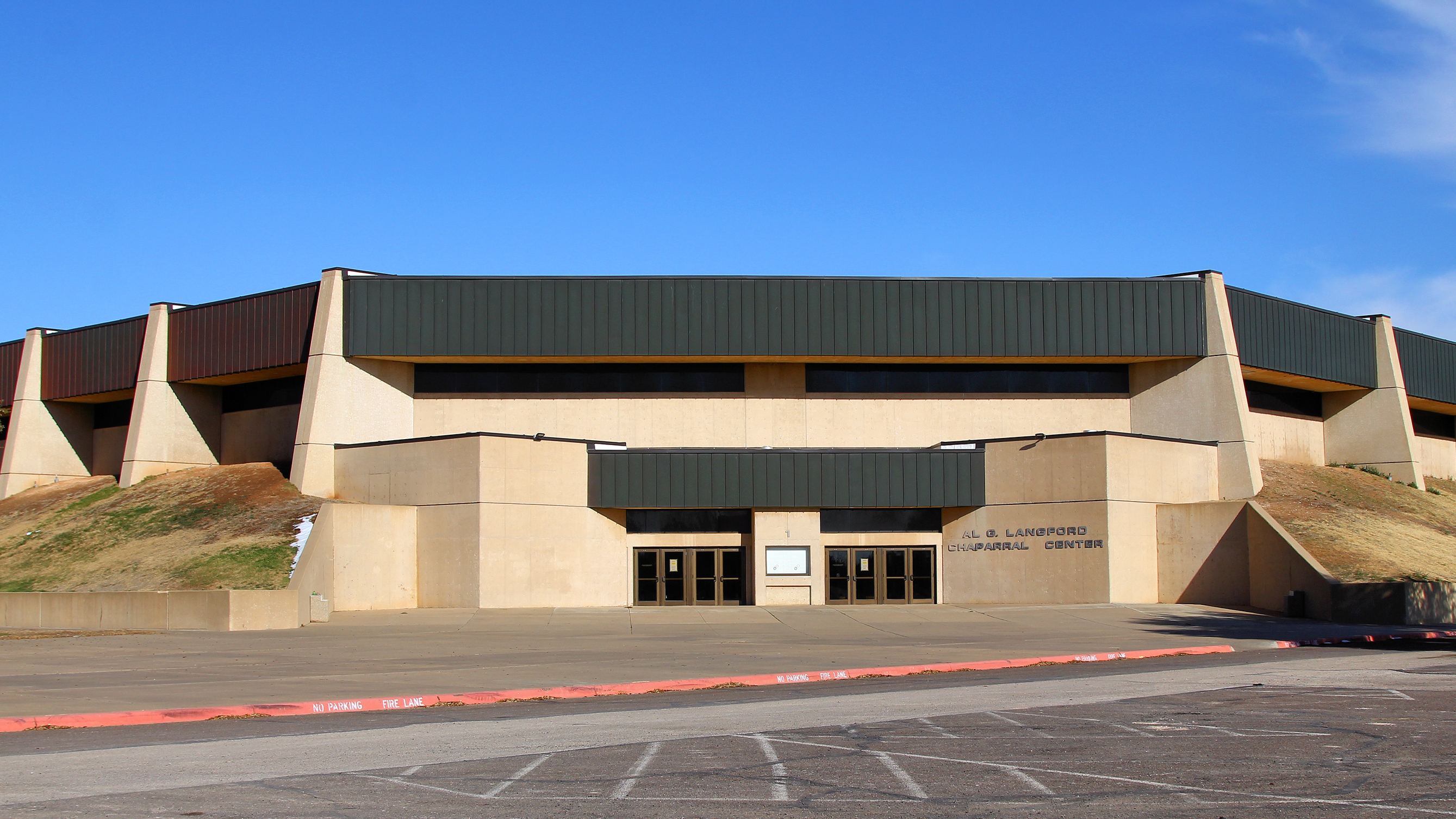
The Langford Chaparral Center at Midland College

The Chaparral Center is a multi-purpose indoor arena located on the campus of Midland College in Midland, Texas. It opened in 1978 and has a capacity of 5,500 people.
