= The Singles Collection Volume 4 =

Box set by Queen
- Released: 18 October 2010
- Recorded: 1975–1998
- Genre: Rock
- Length: 2:04:58
- Label: Parlophone/EMI
- Producers: Queen; David Richards

Queen chronology
The Singles Collection Volume 3 (2010)	The Singles Collection Volume 4 (2010)	Deep Cuts, Volume 1 (1973–1976) (2011)

The Singles Collection, Volume 4 is a limited edition CD series compilation box set by the British rock band Queen, the fourth and last set in the collection. The box set contains remastered versions of the next thirteen top-40 charting singles released by Queen that appear subsequent to those in The Singles Collection Volume 3, excluding the Five Live EP and the Small Soldiers Remix of "Another One Bites The Dust", the latter of which was not released by EMI/Parlophone.

It contains the material released from the years 1988 - 1998, and covers the albums The Miracle, Innuendo, Made in Heaven, Queen Rocks and Greatest Hits III. This was the band's final release on EMI/Parlophone before their back catalogue was re-issued on Universal's Island label in 2011.

== Track listing ==
Disc 1

1. "The Miracle" – 5:03
2. "Stone Cold Crazy" (Live at the Rainbow '74) – 2:10

Disc 2

1. "Innuendo" – 6:33
2. "Bijou" – 3:37

Disc 3

1. "I'm Going Slightly Mad" – 4:25
2. "The Hitman" – 4:57

Disc 4

1. "Headlong" – 4:35
2. "All God's People" – 4:22

Disc 5

1. "The Show Must Go On" – 4:32
2. "Queen Talks" – 1:43

Disc 6

1. "Bohemian Rhapsody" – 5:57
2. "These Are the Days of Our Lives" – 4:15

Disc 7

1. "Heaven for Everyone" (Single Version) – 4:45
2. "It's A Beautiful Day" (B Side Version) – 3:58

Disc 8

1. "A Winter's Tale" – 3:53
2. "Rock in Rio Blues" (UK Single Version) – 4:35

Disc 9

1. "Too Much Love Will Kill You" – 4:22
2. "I Was Born to Love You" – 4:51

Disc 10

1. "Let Me Live" – 4:48
2. "We Will Rock You" (Live at Wembley '86) – 2:56
3. "We Are the Champions" (Live at Wembley '86) – 4:04

Disc 11

1. "You Don't Fool Me" (Edit) – 3:56
2. "You Don't Fool Me" (Album Version) – 5:24

Disc 12

1. "No-One but You (Only the Good Die Young)" – 4:14
2. "We Will Rock You (The Rick Rubin 'Ruined' Remix)" – 5:02
3. "Gimme The Prize (Instrumental Remix for 'The eYe')" – 4:02

Disc 13

1. "Under Pressure" (Rah Mix) (Radio Edit) – 3:47
2. "Under Pressure" (Mike Spencer Remix) – 3:55
3. "Under Pressure" (Live at Knebworth) – 4:17
