= Greatest Hits I & II =

Greatest hits album by Queen
- Released: 14 November 1994
- Recorded: December 1971—November 1990
- Genre: Rock
- Length: 134:05
- Labels: Parlophone; EMI; Hollywood

Queen chronology
Five Live (1993)	Greatest Hits I & II (1994)	Made in Heaven (1995)

Greatest Hits I & II is a compilation album by Queen, released on 14 November 1994 by Parlophone, EMI and Hollywood Records.

== Background and content ==
In the early 1990s, Hollywood Records purchased Queen's catalogue, and alongside rereleasing the 1981 compilation Greatest Hits, they also released a new compilation titled Classic Queen. In 1991, the band released a sequel to Greatest Hits titled Greatest Hits II. The set contains both Greatest Hits one and two, alongside a 40-page booklet.

== Release and reception ==
The set was initially released on 14 November 1994 and was later released in the United States in 1995 to capitalise on the release of the band's final album Made in Heaven, which was released on 6 November 1995. The album did not do very well on the charts due to a limited amount of promotion.

=== Reception ===
Professional ratings
Review scores
Source	Rating
AllMusic	4.5/5 stars
The Rolling Stone Album Guide	4/5 stars

In a review for BBC Music, John Doran wrote that the first disc includes "songs that even your grandma knows", and that the second disc "isn't quite as stunningly impressive, it still charts the second half of their career well".

== Track listing ==
Greatest Hits track listing
No.	Title	Writer(s)	Original release	Length
1.	"Bohemian Rhapsody"	Freddie Mercury	A Night at the Opera (1975)	5:57
2.	"Another One Bites the Dust"	John Deacon	The Game (1980)	3:36
3.	"Killer Queen"	Mercury	Sheer Heart Attack (1974)	2:57
4.	"Fat Bottomed Girls" (single mix)	Brian May	Jazz (1978)	3:22
5.	"Bicycle Race"	Mercury	Jazz	3:01
6.	"You're My Best Friend"	Deacon	A Night at the Opera	2:52
7.	"Don't Stop Me Now"	Mercury	Jazz	3:29
8.	"Save Me"	May	The Game	3:48
9.	"Crazy Little Thing Called Love"	Mercury	The Game	2:42
10.	"Somebody to Love"	Mercury	A Day at the Races (1976)	4:56
11.	"Now I'm Here"	May	Sheer Heart Attack	4:10
12.	"Good Old-Fashioned Lover Boy"	Mercury	A Day at the Races	2:54
13.	"Play the Game"	Mercury	The Game	3:33
14.	"Flash" (single mix)	May	Flash Gordon (1980)	2:48
15.	"Seven Seas of Rhye"	Mercury	Queen II (1974)	2:47
16.	"We Will Rock You"	May	News of the World (1977)	2:01
17.	"We Are the Champions"	Mercury	News of the World	3:00
Total length:				58:19

Greatest Hits II track listing
No.	Title	Writer(s)	Original release	Length
1.	"A Kind of Magic"	Roger Taylor	A Kind of Magic (1986)	4:22
2.	"Under Pressure" (with David Bowie)	Queen, David Bowie	Hot Space (1982)	3:57
3.	"Radio Ga Ga"	Taylor	The Works (1984)	5:43
4.	"I Want It All" (single mix)	Queen (May)	The Miracle (1989)	4:01
5.	"I Want to Break Free" (single mix)	Deacon	The Works	4:18
6.	"Innuendo"	Queen (Mercury/Taylor)	Innuendo (1991)	6:27
7.	"It's a Hard Life"	Mercury	The Works	4:09
8.	"Breakthru"	Queen (Mercury/Taylor)	The Miracle	4:09
9.	"Who Wants to Live Forever"	May	A Kind of Magic	5:16
10.	"Headlong"	Queen (May)	Innuendo	4:37
11.	"The Miracle"	Queen (Mercury/Deacon)	The Miracle	5:01
12.	"I'm Going Slightly Mad"	Queen (Mercury)	Innuendo	4:22
13.	"The Invisible Man"	Queen (Taylor)	The Miracle	3:58
14.	"Hammer to Fall" (single mix)	May	The Works	3:40
15.	"Friends Will Be Friends"	Mercury, Deacon	A Kind of Magic	4:08
16.	"The Show Must Go On"	Queen (May)	Innuendo	4:37
17.	"One Vision" (single mix)	Queen (Taylor)	A Kind of Magic	4:02
Total length:				76:32

== Personnel ==
=== Queen ===
- Freddie Mercury – lead, backing and operatic vocals, acoustic piano, jangle piano, Hammond organ, fingersnaps, bicycle bells, handclaps, acoustic guitar, organ, synthesiser, footstomps, synth bass, sampler, Korg M1 synthesizer on "I'm Going Slightly Mad"
- Brian May – acoustic and electric guitars, co-lead vocals on "Fat Bottomed Girls" (chorus), backing and operatic vocals, bicycle bells, handclaps, piano, synthesiser, footstomps, co-lead vocals on "Keep Yourself Alive" (bridge)
- John Deacon – bass guitar, electric guitar, acoustic and electric pianos, bicycle bells, handclaps, footstomps
- Roger Taylor – drums, percussion, backing and operatic vocals, timpani, gong, triangle, chimes, bicycle bells, handclaps, woodblocks, tambourine, footstomps, cowbell, co-lead vocals on "Keep Yourself Alive" (bridge), drum machine, backing vocals, synthesizer, electric guitar and sampler on "The Invisible Man"

=== Additional performers ===
- Fred Mandel – synthesizers
- David Bowie – lead and backing vocals, Jupiter-8, handclaps and finger snaps on "Under Pressure"
- Mike Stone – co-lead vocals on "Good Old-Fashioned Lover Boy"
- Roy Thomas Baker – stylophone on "Seven Seas of Rhye"
- Chris Rea – fingerclicks on "A Kind of Magic"
- Spike Edney – synthesizer on "A Kind of Magic"
- David Richards – piano on "Under Pressure", keyboards, synth bass and programming on "Breakthru"
- Steve Howe – classical guitar and Spanish guitar solos on "Innuendo"
- Michael Kamen – orchestral arrangements and conductor on "Who Wants to Live Forever"
- National Philharmonic Orchestra – strings, brass and percussion on "Who Wants to Live Forever"

== Charts ==
=== Weekly charts ===
Weekly chart performance for Greatest Hits I & II by Queen
Chart (1994–2022)	Peak position
Australian Albums (ARIA)	50
Austrian Albums (Ö3 Austria)	30
Belgian Albums (Ultratop Flanders)	36
Belgian Albums (Ultratop Wallonia)	47
Canadian Albums (Billboard)	28
Dutch Albums (Album Top 100)	14
German Albums (Offizielle Top 100)	26
New Zealand Albums (RMNZ)	2
UK Rock & Metal Albums (Official Charts)	2
US Top Catalog Albums (Billboard)	3

=== Year–end charts ===
Chart (1994)	Position
Dutch Albums (Album Top 100)	74

Chart (1995)	Position
Belgian Albums (Ultratop Wallonia)	64

== Certifications and sales ==
Region	Certification	Certified units/sales
Belgium (BRMA)	Gold	25,000^{*}
France (SNEP)	Gold	100,000^{*}
Germany (BVMI)	Gold	250,000^{^}
Netherlands (NVPI)	Platinum	100,000^{^}
New Zealand (RMNZ)	4× Platinum	60,000^{^}
South Korea	—	10.027
Spain (Promusicae)	Gold	50,000^{^}
Switzerland (IFPI Switzerland)	Gold	25,000^{^}
United Kingdom (BPI)	Gold	100,000^{^}
United States (RIAA)	Platinum	500,000^{^}
^{*} Sales figures based on certification alone.^{^} Shipments figures based on certification alone.
