= List of awards and nominations received by Queen =

The following is a list of awards and nominations received by the British rock band Queen.

== Accolades ==
=== Inductions ===
Year	Induction
2001	Queen was inducted into the Rock and Roll Hall of Fame.
2002	Queen were given a star on the Hollywood Walk of Fame.
2003	Queen was the first band, rather than just individual, to be inducted into the Songwriters Hall of Fame.
2004	The band was inducted into the UK Music Hall of Fame.
2004	"Bohemian Rhapsody" was inducted into the Grammy Hall of Fame.
2004	Queen were inducted into the RockWalk of Fame (at Guitar Center on Hollywood's Sunset Boulevard)
2006	Queen was the first band inducted into the VH1 Rock Honors.
2018	Queen was awarded the Grammy Lifetime Achievement Award.

=== Awards and nominations ===
Brit Awards

Year	Nominee / work	Award	Result
1977	"Bohemian Rhapsody"	British Single of the Year	Won
1982	Greatest Hits	British Album of the Year	Nominated
1985	The Works	British Album of the Year	Nominated
1985	Queen	British Group	Nominated
1990	"The Invisible Man"	British Video of the Year	Nominated
1990	Queen	Outstanding Contribution to Music	Won
1992	"These Are the Days of Our Lives"	British Single of the Year	Won
1992	Queen	British Group	Nominated
1992	Freddie Mercury	Outstanding Contribution to Music	Won
2005	"We Are the Champions"	British Song of 25 Year	Nominated

Ivor Novello Awards

Year	Nominee / work	Award	Result
1976	"Bohemian Rhapsody"	Best Selling British Record	Won
1981	"Flash"	The Best Film Song, Theme or Score	Nominated
1981	"Another One Bites the Dust"	International Hit of the Year	Nominated
1987	Themselves	Outstanding Contribution to British Music	Won
1992	"These Are the Days of Our Lives"	Best Selling A-Side	Won
1992	"The Show Must Go On"	Best Song Musically And Lyrically	Nominated
2005	Themselves	Outstanding Song Collection	Won

Billboard Music Awards

The Billboard Music Awards are an annual awards show from Billboard. The awards are based on sales data by Nielsen SoundScan and radio information by Nielsen Broadcast Data Systems.

Year	Nominee / work	Award	Result
2019
2019	Themselves	Top Rock Artist	Nominated
2019	Bohemian Rhapsody: The Original Soundtrack	Top Soundtrack	Nominated

Other awards

- 1974
  - Sounds: 3rd Best New British Band, 9th Best International Band
  - Disc: 10th Brightest Hope
  - NME: 2nd Most Promising New Name
- 1975
  - Melody Maker: 'Band of the Year'
  - Record Mirror: 2nd Best British Newcomer, 2nd Best Single ("Killer Queen"), 9th International Group
  - NME: 8th Best British Group, 7th Best Stage Band, 4th Most Promising Group In The World, 3rd Most Promising New Name, 17th Best World Group
  - Disc: Top Live Band, Top International Group, Top British Group, Top Single ("Killer Queen"), 3rd Best Album (Sheer Heart Attack), 5th Best Album (Queen II)
  - Ivor Novello Award to Mercury for "Killer Queen"
  - Golden Lion Award (Belgium) to Mercury for "Killer Queen"
  - Carl Allen Award for contribution to the Ballroom Dancing Industry
- 1976
  - NME: 1st British Stage Band, 2nd Group, 5th World Group, 3rd World Stage Band, Mercury: 7th World Singer, May: 3rd Top Guitarist, 1st British Single ("Bohemian Rhapsody"), 2nd Album ("A Night at the Opera")
  - Record Mirror / Disc: 1st Best British Group, 1st World Group, No. 1 Single ("Bohemian Rhapsody"), No. 6 Album (A Night at the Opera), Mercury: 5th British Singer, 6th World Singer, 4th British Songwriter, 5th World Songwriter, May: 4th British Musician, 4th World Musician
  - Sound: Best Band, Best Album (A Night at the Opera), Best Single ("Bohemian Rhapsody")
  - Ivor Novello Award to Mercury for "Bohemian Rhapsody"
- 1977
  - Brit Award: Best British Single of the Last 25 Years ("Bohemian Rhapsody")
  - Grammy Award nominations: Best Pop Vocal Performance by a Duo, Group or Chorus and Best Arrangement for Voices ("Bohemian Rhapsody")
  - Europe One Radio: Most Potential Rock Band
- 1979
  - Music Life, Japan: Top Group, Top Album (Jazz), Top Single, Top Singer, Top Guitarist, Top Drummer, Top Bass Player
- 1980
  - Juno Awards, Canada: Best Group, Best International Single ("Another One Bites the Dust"), Best International Album (The Game)
  - Record World USA: Top Male Group, Top Producer, Top Disco Crossover (All awarded for "Another One Bites the Dust")
  - Dick Clark Awards USA: Best Band
  - Circus Magazine USA: 2nd Best Group, 1st Live Show, No. 1 Album (The Game), No. 1 Single ("Another One Bites the Dust"), No.3 Single ("Crazy Little Thing Called Love"), Mercury: 2nd Male Vocalist, 3rd Best Songwriter, 3rd Best Keyboard Player; 3rd Best Guitarist, 3rd Best Bassist, 3rd Best Drummer
- 1981
  - Grammy Award nominations: Producer of the Year (Non-Classical) with Mack (The Game) and Best Rock Performance by a Duo or Group with Vocal ("Another One Bites the Dust")
  - American Music Award: Favorite Pop/Rock Single ("Another One Bites the Dust") and nomination for Favorite Pop/Rock Band/Duo/Group (The Game)
  - Music Life, Japan: Best Group, Best Vocalist, Best Bass Player, 2nd Best Guitarist, 2nd Drummer
  - NARM Award USA: Biggest Selling Single of 1980 ("Another One Bites the Dust")
- 1982
  - Brit Award nomination: Best British Album (Greatest Hits)
- 1984
  - Nordoff-Robbins Music Therapy Silver Clef Award: Outstanding Contribution to British Music
  - UK Video Awards: Highly Commended in Best Compilation Category for The Works EP. Best Video award for "Radio Ga Ga"
- 1985
  - Brit Award nominations: Best British Album and Best British Group (The Works)
- 1986
  - Daily Mirror Reader's Poll: Top British Group, Top Male Vocalist, 5th Best Album (A Kind of Magic)
  - Daily Express: Best Album Cover Award (A Kind of Magic)
  - British Video Awards: Top Music Video Award (Live In Rio)
  - Worldwide Music Awards: Best Worldwide Group
- 1987
  - Sun: Best Male Vocalist for Mercury
  - Capital Radio London: Best Group
  - Ivor Novello Award: for Outstanding Contribution to British Music
  - British Video Awards: Best Video, Music category for Live In Budapest
- 1988
  - Golden Rose Festival, Montreux: International Music Media Conference: Best Long Form Video worldwide (The Magic Years)
  - Festerio, Rio de Janeiro, Brazil: Best video documentary (The Magic Years)
- 1989
  - Independent Television Awards: Best Band of the Eighties
  - US Film & Video Festival: Silver Screen Award (The Magic Years)
  - Diamond Awards, Antwerp: Best Special Effects Award ("The Invisible Man")
- 1990
  - Brit Award: Outstanding Contribution to Music and nomination for Best Music Video
- 1991
  - American Film & Video Festival, Chicago: Innuendo won 1st Prize, "I'm Going Slightly Mad" won 3rd Prize for Creative Excellence in the Art Culture and Performing Arts category
  - Monitor Awards (International Teleproduction Society), New York City: Best Achievement in Music Video ("Innuendo")
- 1992
  - Brit Award: Mercury received a posthumous Outstanding Contribution To Music Award, Best British Single ("These Are the Days of Our Lives") and nominations for Best British Single ("Bohemian Rhapsody") and Best British Group (Innuendo).
  - Ivor Novello Award: Best Single ("These Are the Days of Our Lives"), May received a Best TV Commercial Music Award ("Driven by You")
  - Golden Giraffe Award: Greatest Hits II (Award given by the Association of Hungarian Record Producers)
  - MTV Awards: Best Video From A Movie (Wayne's World)
  - US Film & Video Festival, Chicago: Gold Camera Awards (The Freddie Mercury Tribute), (Greatest Flix II), ("The Show Must Go On") ("These Are the Days of Our Lives")
- 1993
  - Ivor Novello Award: to Mercury ("Living on My Own") (posthumous)
  - American Society Of Composers, Authors & Publishers: Mercury posthumously awarded for "Bohemian Rhapsody" as the Most Played Record in the U.S. of 1993
  - Monitor Awards, Hollywood: "Red Couch" Awards (Greatest Flix II and "I'm Going Slightly Mad")
- 1997
  - Ivor Novello Award: Best Song Lyrically & Musically ("Too Much Love Will Kill You")
- 2001
  - Golden Rose Film Festival, Montreux: Prix de la Presse (Freddie Mercury: The Untold Story)
- 2002
  - Grammy Award nomination: Best Long Form Music Video for Freddie Mercury (Freddie Mercury: The Untold Story)
  - New York Film Festival: Gold World Medal for the Best Television and Entertainment Program (Variety Special Section), Gold World Medal for the Best Home Video (Music Video Section) for Freddie Mercury: The Untold Story
  - Capital FM Awards: Outstanding Contribution to Music
  - Guinness World Records: UK's best single of the past 50 years ("Bohemian Rhapsody")
  - Annual DVD Awards: Best DVD-Audio/Non Video (A Night at the Opera)
  - Surround Music Awards: "Most Adventurous Mix" and "Listener's Choice" (A Night at the Opera)
- 2003
  - Annual DVD Awards: Best DVD-Audio (The Game)
  - DVD Awards At The Universal Sheraton: DVD-Audio Of The Year (The Game)
  - Capital Legends Awards: Legendary Group
  - European Music DVD-Award: Best Live DVD (Live At Wembley Stadium)
  - Surround Music Award: "Best Mix: Non-Orchestral" (The Game)
- 2005
  - Brit Award nomination: BRITs 25 Best Song ("We Are the Champions")
  - "Don't Stop Me Now" was voted as "The Greatest Driving Song Ever" by viewers of the BBC television program Top Gear.
- 2011
  - At the MTV Europe Music Awards Queen received the Global Icon award.
- 2018
  - The band received the Grammy Lifetime Achievement Award.
- 2025
  - The band received the Polar Music Prize.

=== Polls ===
- 1999 - The band was voted the greatest band in music history.
- 2005 - The band's performance at Live Aid is voted two times by a large selection of musicians and critics to be the greatest live show of all time.
- 2007 - The band was voted the 'Best British Band Of All Time.'
- 2008 - The band enters the Grammy Hall of Fame.
