= Greatest Hits II (Queen album) =

Greatest hits album by Queen
- Released: 28 October 1991
- Recorded: 1981–1990; 1981–1995 (2011 Japan reissue edition)
- Genre: Rock
- Length: 76:32
- Labels: EMI/Parlophone (Europe); Hollywood (North America)

Queen chronology
CD Single Box (1991)	Greatest Hits II (1991)	Classic Queen (1992)

Professional ratings
Review scores
Source	Rating
AllMusic	link
NME	4/10
The Rolling Stone Album Guide	4/5 stars

Greatest Hits II is a compilation album by the British rock band Queen, released on 28 October 1991. The album consisted of Queen's biggest hits between 1981 and 1991, from the UK chart-topper "Under Pressure" to "The Show Must Go On".

The compilation Greatest Hits II reached number one on the UK Albums Chart, and is the tenth best-selling album in the UK with sales of 3.9 million copies as of 2014. It is the seventh best-selling album in Germany, the thirteenth best-selling album in France, and the best-selling album by a foreign artist in Finland. Accumulated sales (Greatest Hits II and Classic Queen for the US and Canada combined) are in excess of 25 million worldwide.

Freddie Mercury designed the crest on the album cover, using the astrological signs of the four members: two Leos (Roger Taylor and John Deacon), one Cancer (Brian May) and one Virgo (Mercury).

== Content ==
The compilation contains most of Queen's hits from 1981 to 1991. The singles "Body Language", "Back Chat", "Las Palabras de Amor", "Thank God It's Christmas", "Princes of the Universe" and "Scandal" were omitted for this release. "Las Palabras de Amor", "Thank God It's Christmas", "These Are the Days of Our Lives" and "Princes of the Universe" were later included on Greatest Hits III.

== Release ==
Greatest Hits II was released less than a month before the death of lead singer Freddie Mercury and was the last Queen release of any kind while he was still alive. The album was not initially made available in the United States and was replaced with its counterpart Classic Queen in early 1992 to capitalise on the band's renewed popularity in the country following the inclusion of "Bohemian Rhapsody" in Wayne's World. Greatest Hits II was later made available in the US with its inclusion in two box sets, Greatest Hits I & II in 1994, and The Platinum Collection: Greatest Hits I, II & III in 2002. On 19 April 2011, Hollywood Records released the newly remastered version of Greatest Hits II in the United States as an individual album for the first time.

A companion video release entitled Greatest Flix II was released at the same time, but is currently out of print. Most of the videos are now available on the DVD Greatest Video Hits 2 with the exception of the videos from the 1991 Innuendo album.

== Track listing ==
Side one
No.	Title	Writer(s)	Original album	Length
1.	"A Kind of Magic"	Roger Taylor	A Kind of Magic, 1986	4:22
2.	"Under Pressure" (with David Bowie)	Queen, David Bowie	Hot Space, 1982	3:57
3.	"Radio Ga Ga"	Taylor	The Works, 1984	5:43
4.	"I Want It All" (single mix)	Queen (Brian May)	The Miracle, 1989	4:01
5.	"I Want to Break Free" (single mix)	John Deacon	The Works, 1984	4:18

Side two
No.	Title	Writer(s)	Original album	Length
6.	"Innuendo"	Queen (Mercury/Taylor)	Innuendo, 1991	6:27
7.	"It's a Hard Life"	Freddie Mercury	The Works, 1984	4:09
8.	"Breakthru"	Queen (Mercury/Taylor)	The Miracle, 1989	4:09
9.	"Who Wants to Live Forever"	May	A Kind of Magic, 1986	5:16

Side three
No.	Title	Writer(s)	Original album	Length
10.	"Headlong"	Queen (May)	Innuendo, 1991	4:37
11.	"The Miracle"	Queen (Mercury/Deacon)	The Miracle, 1989	5:01
12.	"I'm Going Slightly Mad"	Queen (Mercury)	Innuendo, 1991	4:22
13.	"The Invisible Man"	Queen (Taylor)	The Miracle, 1989	3:58

Side four
No.	Title	Writer(s)	Original album	Length
14.	"Hammer to Fall" (single mix)	May	The Works, 1984	3:40
15.	"Friends Will Be Friends"	Mercury, Deacon	A Kind of Magic, 1986	4:08
16.	"The Show Must Go On"	Queen (May)	Innuendo, 1991	4:37
17.	"One Vision" (single mix)	Queen (Taylor)	A Kind of Magic, 1986	4:01
Total length:				76:31

CD version Some tracks were edited for CD by David Richards.
No.	Title	Length
1.	"A Kind of Magic" (early fade)	4:22
2.	"Under Pressure" (edited version)	3:58
3.	"Radio Ga Ga"	5:43
4.	"I Want It All" (single version)	4:01
5.	"I Want to Break Free" (single remix)	4:18
6.	"Innuendo"	6:27
7.	"It's a Hard Life"	4:09
8.	"Breakthru"	4:09
9.	"Who Wants to Live Forever" (edited version)	4:57
10.	"Headlong" (original Innuendo LP edit)	4:33
11.	"The Miracle" (early fade)	4:54
12.	"I'm Going Slightly Mad" (original Innuendo LP edit)	4:07
13.	"The Invisible Man"	3:58
14.	"Hammer to Fall" (single version)	3:40
15.	"Friends Will Be Friends"	4:10
16.	"The Show Must Go On" (early fade-out)	4:23
17.	"One Vision" (single version)	4:01
Total length:		75:57

2011 Japan reissue bonus track Available on iTunes.
No.	Title	Writer(s)	Length
18.	"I Was Born to Love You" (From Made in Heaven, 1995)	Mercury	4:48
Total length:			79:53

== Charts ==
=== Weekly charts ===
Chart (1991)	Peak position
Australian Top 50 Albums	4
Finnish Top 100 Albums	1
Netherlands Top 100 Albums	1
New Zealand Top 40 Albums	1
Swiss Top 100 Albums	1
UK Albums Chart	1

Chart (1992)	Peak position
Austrian Top 75 Albums	1
French Compilations	1
German Albums Chart	2
Hungarian Top 40 Albums	1
Norwegian Top 40 Albums	4
Portuguese Albums (AFP)	1
Swedish Top 60 Albums	2

Chart (2006)	Peak position
Italian Top 100 Albums	28

Chart (2008)	Peak position
Mexican Albums (AMPROFON)	10
Spanish Top 100 Albums	45

Chart (2012)	Peak position
US Top Hard Rock Albums (Billboard)	25

Chart (2025)	Peak position
Irish Albums (Official Charts)	49

Chart (2019–2025)	Peak position
Belgian Albums (Ultratop Flanders)	144
Belgian Albums (Ultratop Wallonia)	25
Polish Albums (ZPAV)	94
Portuguese Albums (AFP)	151
US Top Hard Rock Albums (Billboard)	16

=== Year-end charts ===
Chart (1991)	Position
New Zealand Albums (RMNZ)	34

Chart (1992)	Position
Argentina Foreign Albums (CAPIF)	3
New Zealand Albums (RMNZ)	2

Chart (1993)	Position
New Zealand Albums (RMNZ)	28

Chart (1997)	Position
German Albums Chart	72

Chart (2018)	Position
Mexican Albums (AMPROFON)	81

Chart (2019)	Position
Belgian Albums (Ultratop Wallonia)	194
Mexican Albums (AMPROFON)	34

== Certifications and sales ==
Region	Certification	Certified units/sales
Argentina (CAPIF)	Diamond	500,000^{^}
Australia (ARIA)	8× Platinum	560,000^{^}
Austria (IFPI Austria)	4× Platinum	200,000^{*}
Brazil (Pro-Música Brasil)	2× Platinum	500,000^{*}
Denmark (IFPI Danmark)	Gold	10,000^{‡}
Finland (Musiikkituottajat)	2× Platinum	149,622
France (SNEP)	Diamond	1,000,000^{*}
Germany (BVMI)	9× Gold	2,250,000^{^}
Italy sales: October 1991 - February 1992	—	500,000
Italy (FIMI) sales since 2009	Platinum	50,000^{‡}
Mexico (AMPROFON)	Platinum	250,000
Netherlands (NVPI)	5× Platinum	500,000^{^}
Poland (ZPAV)	Gold	10,000^{‡}
Portugal (AFP)	4× Platinum	28,000^{‡}
Spain (Promusicae)	5× Platinum	500,000^{^}
Sweden (GLF)	Platinum	100,000^{^}
Switzerland (IFPI Switzerland)	5× Platinum	250,000^{^}
United Kingdom (BPI)	14× Platinum	4,200,000^{‡}
^{*} Sales figures based on certification alone.^{^} Shipments figures based on certification alone.^{‡} Sales+streaming figures based on certification alone.

== See also ==
- List of best-selling albums in Brazil
- List of best-selling albums in Finland
- List of best-selling albums in Germany
- List of best-selling albums in the Netherlands
- List of best-selling albums in the United Kingdom
