= Queen: The Eye =

1997 video game

- Developer(s): Destination Design
- Publisher(s): Electronic Arts
- Engine: BRender
- Platform(s): MS-DOS, Windows
- Release: EU: 1997; NA: 1998
- Genre(s): Action-adventure
- Mode(s): Single player

Queen: The Eye is an action-adventure electronic video game that was released in 1997-1998 by Electronic Arts, and featured music by the rock group Queen which was remixed exclusively for The Eye by Joshua J. Macrae at Roger Taylor's studio in Surrey. The game is set in the future where the world is ruled by an all-seeing machine called "The eYe" which has eradicated everything that promotes creative expression. The player takes the role of Dubroc, a secret agent of The eYe who in the course of his duties has re-discovered a database of popular rock music, and is sentenced to death in "The Arena", a live television show broadcast through satellites to the world in which the contestant battles fighting arena champions called the Watchers. From there Dubroc goes on a quest to destroy The eYe. Many elements of the story were adapted into the Queen musical We Will Rock You.

Queen: The Eye came on five CDs, each of which includes several of the Queen tracks in the Red Book audio format used by audio CD players, though some songs can only be heard by playing the game. The game suffered poor sales due to weak gameplay, very little promotion and graphics that already seemed dated at release due to the game's unusually long development time.

== Development ==
The game uses pre-rendered backgrounds and polygonal characters which were animated using motion capture. Visual concepts and artwork associated with Queen, such as their album covers, were incorporated into the environments.

== Track listing ==
=== Disc 1 - "The Arena Domain" ===
1. Data track (includes "Arboria") - 22:22
2. "Made in Heaven" (loop) - 1:08
3. "I Want It All" (instrumental, remix) - 4:43
4. "Dragon Attack" (instrumental, remix) - 4:23
5. "Fight From The Inside" (instrumental) - 3:03
6. "Hang On In There" (intro) - 0:57
7. "In The Lap of the Gods...Revisited" (edit, vocals) - 0:32
8. "Modern Times Rock'n'Roll" (instrumental) - 1:44
9. "More Of That Jazz" (instrumental) - 4:30
10. "We Will Rock You" (commentary mix) - 0:58
11. "Liar" (intro) - 1:26
12. "The Night Comes Down" (intro) - 0:48
13. "Party" (instrumental) - 2:26 (not on the English version of the game)
14. "Chinese Torture" (usual version) - 1:44
15. "I Want It All" (instrumental, remix) - 4:53

=== Disc 2 - "The Works Domain" ===
1. Data track - 25:45
2. "Mustapha" (intro, vocals) - 0:26
3. "Mother Love" (instrumental) - 4:16
4. "You Take My Breath Away" (instrumental) - 3:15
5. "One Vision" (intro) - 0:32
6. "Sweet Lady" (edit, vocals) - 1:03
7. "Was It All Worth It" (instrumental, edit) - 1:57
8. "Get Down, Make Love" (instrumental, remix) - 3:49
9. "Heaven For Everyone" (instrumental) - 5:36
10. "Hammer To Fall" (instrumental) - 4:22
11. "Tie Your Mother Down" (intro) - 0:39
12. "One Vision" (instrumental, remix) - 2:27
13. "It's Late" (edit, vocals) - 1:08
14. "Procession" (usual version) - 1:14
15. "Made in Heaven" (instrumental, remix) - 5:24

=== Disc 3 - "The Theatre Domain" ===
1. Data track - 21:53
2. "It's A Beautiful Day" (remix) - 1:38
3. "Don't Lose Your Head" (instrumental) - 1:59
4. "Princes Of The Universe" (instrumental, remix) - 1:08
5. "A Kind Of Magic" (instrumental) - 4:25
6. "Gimme The Prize" (remix, vocals) - 4:03
7. "Bring Back That Leroy Brown" (edit, vocals) - 0:27
8. "Ha Ha Ha, It's Magic!" (vocal sample) - 0:06
9. "You Don't Fool Me" (instrumental) - 5:58
10. "Let Me Entertain You" (instrumental, intro) - 0:49
11. "Khashoggi's Ship" (instrumental) - 1:37
12. "Forever" (usual version) - 3:21
13. "Don't Try So Hard" (edit, vocals) - 1:35
14. "Was It All Worth It" (intro) - 0:37

=== Disc 4 - "The Innuendo Domain" ===
1. Data track - 25:40
2. "Brighton Rock" (intro) - 0:13
3. "I'm Going Slightly Mad" (instrumental) - 2:40
4. "Bijou" (instrumental, edit) - 1:27
5. "Khashoggi's Ship" (instrumental) - 1:37
6. "The Show Must Go On" (instrumental, remix) - 4:26
7. "The Hitman" (instrumental, edit) - 1:07
8. "Too Much Love Will Kill You" (edit, vocals) - 1:50
9. "I Can't Live With You" (instrumental, remix) - 4:40
10. "Love Of My Life" (harp intro only) - 0:04

=== Disc 5 - "The Final Domain" ===
1. Data track - 21:48
2. "Death On Two Legs" (intro) - 0:40
3. "Death On Two Legs" (instrumental) - 3:07
4. "Ride The Wild Wind" (instrumental, remix) - 4:45
5. "Headlong" (instrumental) - 4:53
6. "Breakthru" (instrumental) - 2:07
7. "Hammer To Fall" (instrumental) - 4:32
8. "Gimme The Prize" (instrumental, remix) - 4:12
9. "The Hitman" (instrumental, remix) - 2:40
10. "Don't Lose Your Head" (usual version) - 4:40
11. "Gimme The Prize" (vocals, remix) - 4:11

== Reception ==
Reception

Review scores
Publication	Score
Edge	5/10
GameStar	64%
PC PowerPlay	60%
PC Zone	56%

Queen: The Eye met with mixed reviews. Several reviewers described the fight sequences as frustrating, due to unresponsive controls and confusing camera angles. PC Zone found the game's graphics unimpressive, although PC PowerPlay considered them "absolutely stunning".

In a 2012 retrospective article, Richard Cobbett of PC Gamer rated the game negatively, considering it drab and boring. He concluded that "the only real reason people played this game at all was to hear the music".
