= The Singles Collection Volume 3 =

Box set by Queen
- Released: 31 May 2010
- Recorded: 1983–1989
- Genre: Rock
- Length: 1:49:28
- Label: Parlophone/EMI
- Producers: Queen; Mack; David Richards

Queen chronology
Absolute Greatest (2009)	The Singles Collection Volume 3 (2010)	The Singles Collection Volume 4 (2010)

The Singles Collection, Volume 3 is a limited edition CD series compilation box set by the British rock band Queen, the third of four sets. The box set contains remastered versions of the next thirteen top-40 charting singles released by Queen that appear subsequent to those in The Singles Collection Volume 2.

The set marks the first time that "Blurred Vision" and the single mix of "Pain Is So Close to Pleasure" have been made available on CD.

== Track listing ==
Disc 1

1. "It's a Hard Life" – 4:10
2. "Is This the World We Created...?" – 2:13

Disc 2

1. "Hammer to Fall" (Single Version) – 3:41
2. "Tear It Up" – 3:25

Disc 3

1. "Thank God It's Christmas" – 4:22
2. "Man on the Prowl" – 3:27
3. "Keep Passing the Open Windows" – 5:22

Disc 4

1. "One Vision" (Single Version) – 4:03
2. "Blurred Vision" – 4:42

Disc 5

1. "A Kind of Magic" – 4:27
2. "A Dozen Red Roses For My Darling" – 4:44

Disc 6

1. "Friends Will Be Friends" – 4:08
2. "Princes of the Universe" – 3:32

Disc 7

1. "Pain Is So Close to Pleasure" (Single Remix) – 4:01
2. "Don't Lose Your Head" – 4:38

Disc 8

1. "Who Wants to Live Forever" (Single Version) – 4:04
2. "Forever" – 3:21

Disc 9

1. "One Year Of Love" – 4:28
2. "Gimme The Prize" – 4:34

Disc 10

1. "I Want It All" (Single Version) – 4:03
2. "Hang On in There" – 3:46

Disc 11

1. "Breakthru" – 4:10
2. "Stealin'" – 3:59

Disc 12

1. "The Invisible Man" – 3:58
2. "Hijack My Heart" – 4:11

Disc 13

1. "Scandal" – 4:44
2. "My Life Has Been Saved" (Original Version) – 3:15
