= Classic Queen =

Compilation album by Queen
- Released: 3 March 1992
- Recorded: 1972–1990
- Genre: Rock
- Length: 75:10
- Label: Hollywood
- Producer: Roy Thomas Baker, David Bowie, David Richards, Mack and Queen

Queen chronology
| Greatest Hits II (1991) | Classic Queen (1992) | Live at Wembley '86 (1992) |

Professional ratings
Review scores
| Source | Rating |
|---|---|
| AllMusic | link |
| MusicHound Rock | 4/5 stars |
| The Rolling Stone Album Guide | 2/5 stars |

Classic Queen is a 1992 compilation album by the British rock band Queen. The album was seen as a US version of Greatest Hits II and was issued to capitalize on the renewed popularity of Queen in the United States following the release of the movie Wayne's World and the death of Freddie Mercury. The album reached number four on the US Billboard 200 and was certified three times platinum in the US and five times platinum in Canada. Accumulated sales (Greatest Hits II and Classic Queen for the US and Canada combined) are in excess of 25 million worldwide.

== Content and release ==
Although well received, Classic Queen did not fit in with the previous Queen compilations. Its track listing overlapped with both the 1981 Greatest Hits and the 1991 import Greatest Hits II albums and contained a few tracks not found on either of the previous releases. To remedy this situation, Hollywood Records re-released Greatest Hits six months later in 1992 in the US only, containing two different tracks from the UK edition. This was an effort to make it a companion collection with Classic Queen. The two compilations had near-identical covers, with Greatest Hits having a red background, while Classic Queen had royal blue. As the two were seen as counterparts, many of Queen's biggest hits which had appeared on Greatest Hits were left off Classic Queen, such as "Another One Bites the Dust", "We Will Rock You", "We Are the Champions", "Somebody to Love" and "Don't Stop Me Now".

There was also a video cassette version of the album released (modelled after the Greatest Flix II video), but long out of print. It contained the 'Wayne's World' version of "Bohemian Rhapsody", plus newly created videos for "Stone Cold Crazy", "One Year of Love" and "Keep Yourself Alive".

Following Hollywood Records officially rereleasing the original 1981 Greatest Hits album in 2004 and issuing Greatest Hits II in North America since 19 April 2011 individually, both the 1992 version of Greatest Hits and Classic Queen are out of print, save for a 2014 limited-edition Canadian reissue of the latter.

== Track listing ==
| No. | Title | Writer(s) | Length |
|---|---|---|---|
| 1. | "A Kind of Magic" (from A Kind of Magic, 1986) | Roger Taylor | 4:23 |
| 2. | "Bohemian Rhapsody" (from A Night at the Opera, 1975) | Freddie Mercury | 5:59 |
| 3. | "Under Pressure" (unique mix, originally from Hot Space, 1982) | David Bowie, Queen | 4:03 |
| 4. | "Hammer to Fall" (single version of track from The Works, 1984) | Brian May | 3:40 |
| 5. | "Stone Cold Crazy" (from Sheer Heart Attack, 1974) | Queen | 2:15 |
| 6. | "One Year of Love" (from A Kind of Magic, 1986) | John Deacon | 4:28 |
| 7. | "Radio Ga Ga" (from The Works, 1984) | Taylor | 5:48 |
| 8. | "I'm Going Slightly Mad" (from Innuendo, 1991) | Queen (Mercury), Peter Straker (uncredited) | 4:21 |
| 9. | "I Want It All" (single version of track from The Miracle, 1989) | Queen (May) | 4:01 |
| 10. | "Tie Your Mother Down" (single version of track from A Day at the Races, 1976) | May | 3:45 |
| 11. | "The Miracle" (unique edit, from The Miracle, 1989) | Queen (Mercury, Deacon) | 4:24 |
| 12. | "These Are the Days of Our Lives" (from Innuendo, 1991) | Queen (Taylor) | 4:14 |
| 13. | "One Vision" (unique edit, from A Kind of Magic, 1986) | Queen | 4:38 |
| 14. | "Keep Yourself Alive" (from Queen, 1973) | May | 3:45 |
| 15. | "Headlong" (from Innuendo, 1991) | Queen (May) | 4:38 |
| 16. | "Who Wants to Live Forever" (from A Kind of Magic, 1986) | May | 5:15 |
| 17. | "The Show Must Go On" (from Innuendo, 1991) | Queen (May) | 4:31 |
| Total length: | | | 75:10 |

== Personnel ==
- Freddie Mercury – lead, backing and operatic vocals, synthesiser, piano, organ, sampler, keyboard, handclaps, finger snaps
- Brian May – electric, acoustic and slide guitar, co-lead vocals on "I Want It All", "Keep Yourself Alive" (bridge), and "Who Wants to Live Forever", operatic and backing vocals, synthesizer, sampler, piano, keyboards, programming, drum programming, handclaps, finger snaps, orchestral arrangements (except on "One Year of Love")
- Roger Taylor – acoustic and electronic drums, drum machine, timpani, gong, tambourine, maracas, bar chimes, cowbell, co-lead vocals on "Keep Yourself Alive" (bridge), backing and operatic vocals, synthesiser, vocoder, sampler, keyboards, handclaps, finger snaps
- John Deacon – bass guitar, handclaps, finger snaps, synthesiser, sampler, drum programming (except on "Who Wants to Live Forever")

=== Additional personnel ===
- David Bowie – co-lead vocals, synthesiser, handclaps and finger snaps on "Under Pressure"
- Fred Mandel – synthesiser on "Hammer to Fall" and "Radio Ga Ga"
- Steve Gregory – saxophone on "One Year of Love"
- Lynton Naiff – string arrangements on "One Year of Love"
- David Richards – keyboards, percussion and programming on "These Are The Days of Our Lives"
- Michael Kamen – orchestral arrangements and conducting on "Who Wants to Live Forever"
- National Philharmonic Orchestra – strings, brass and percussion on "Who Wants to Live Forever"

== Charts ==
=== Weekly charts ===
Weekly chart performance for Classic Queen
| Chart (1992) | Peak position |
|---|---|
| US Billboard 200 | 4 |

=== Year-end charts ===
1992 year-end chart performance for Classic Queen
| Chart (1992) | Position |
|---|---|
| Canada Top Albums/CDs (RPM) | 1 |
| US Billboard 200 | 34 |

2002 year-end chart performance for Classic Queen
| Chart (2002) | Position |
|---|---|
| Canadian Metal Albums (Nielsen SoundScan) | 64 |

== Certifications ==
Certifications for Classic Queen
| Region | Certification | Certified units/sales |
|---|---|---|
| Canada (Music Canada) | 5× Platinum | 500,000^{^} |
| United States (RIAA) | 3× Platinum | 3,000,000^{^} |
^{^} Shipments figures based on certification alone.
