= Future Management =

1981 single by Roger Taylor

- UK picture sleeve

Single by Roger Taylor

from the album Fun in Space
- B-side: "Laugh or Cry"
- Released: 30 March 1981
- Studio: Mountain, Montreux
- Genre: Rock; new wave; pop rock; reggae
- Length: 2:57
- Label: EMI
- Songwriter: Roger Taylor
- Producer: Roger Taylor

Roger Taylor singles chronology
"I Wanna Testify" (1977)	"Future Management" (1981)	"Let's Get Crazy" (1981)

Music video
- "Future Management" on YouTube

"Future Management" is a song composed and performed by English musician Roger Taylor. It was released in March 1981 as the first single from his 1981 debut album Fun in Space. The song reached No. 49 on the UK Singles Chart. It is Taylor's second solo single, after his debut "I Wanna Testify" in 1977.

== Track listing ==
All songs written by Roger Taylor.

- 1981 UK 7" single
1. "Future Management" – 2:57
2. "Laugh or Cry" – 3:07

== Personnel ==
- Roger Taylor – drums, percussion, lead and backing vocals, guitars, bass guitar
- David Richards – keyboards

== Charts ==
Chart (1981)	Peak position
UK Singles (Official Charts Company)	49
