= DoRo Productions =

Austrian film production company

DoRo Produktion Ges.mbH a.k.a. DoRo Productions is a film company based in Vienna, Austria. DoRo was named after the surnames of founders Rudi Dolezal and Hannes Rossacher.

== History ==
Dolezal and Rossacher, also known as the "Torpedo Twins", first started producing television series for Austrian and German stations ORF, ARD and ZDF. They gained international acclaim and won several awards for their music videos for artists such as Queen, The Rolling Stones, David Bowie, Miles Davis, Michael Jackson, Bon Jovi, Whitney Houston, Bruce Springsteen, Falco and Frank Zappa, as well as several German and Austrian acts such as Trio, Marius Müller-Westernhagen, and Herbert Grönemeyer. Furthermore, DoRo produced numerous acclaimed documentaries, mostly on musicians, bands and similarly music-related topics.

DoRo Productions spawned numerous subsidiaries (German MTV competitor VIVA was partly founded and conceived by DoRo). However, in late 2002 the economic downturn in the music business in general and the music video business in particular resulted in the closure of most of these companies, including the company base in Vienna.

In 2003, the Munich subsidiary, DoRo Media AG, bought back from creditors, formed the basis for a restart of DoRo, in which Queen manager Jim Beach played a notable role. In the meantime, DoRo have reopened a branch office in Vienna.

DoRo continues to produce concert films and music-related documentaries, but has ceased production of music videos. Hannes Rossacher has been quoted as saying: "The video clip business is done – both artistically and commercially. I just don't feel like doing a production promoting "DJ Nerd featuring Miss Talentless"."

== Notable music videos ==
Queen music videos:

- One Vision (1985)
- Friends Will Be Friends (1986)
- Breakthru (1989)
- The Invisible Man (1989)
- Scandal (1989)
- The Miracle (1989)
- Innuendo (1991)
- I'm Going Slightly Mad (1991)
- Headlong (1991)
- The Show Must Go On (1991)
- These Are the Days of Our Lives (1991)
- A Winter's Tale (1995)
- Too Much Love Will Kill You (1995)
- No-One but You (Only the Good Die Young) (1997)

Other notable music videos by DoRo:

- The Rolling Stones - Time is on My Side (Version 2)
- Lou Bega - Mambo #5
- David Bowie - Seven Years in Tibet
- Rammstein - Sonne
- Falco - Rock Me Amadeus, Jeanny, Out Of The Dark, Body Next to Body
- Spiller - Groovejet (If This Ain't Love)
- The Cross - Power To Love
- Scorpions - Acoustica
- Modern Talking - Atlantis Is Calling (S.O.S. for Love), Jet Airliner

== Music documentaries ==
- Queen: The Magic Years Volumes 1, 2 and 3
- Freddie Mercury: The Untold Story
- Get Up, Stand Up
- Whitney Houston: Close Up
