= Fun in Space =

Studio album by Roger Taylor
- Released: 6 April 1981
- Recorded: 1978 – 1981
- Studios: Mountain, Montreux, Switzerland
- Genre: Rock
- Length: 40:12
- Labels: EMI; Parlophone; Elektra
- Producer: Roger Taylor

Roger Taylor chronology
Fun in Space (1981)	Strange Frontier (1984)

Singles from Fun in Space
- 1. "Future Management" Released: 30 March 1981; 2. "Let's Get Crazy" Released: 15 May 1981 (Jpn, Aus, US); 3. "My Country" Released: 29 June 1981 (UK)

Fun in Space is the debut solo album by the English musician Roger Taylor, the drummer of Queen. It was released on 6 April 1981 in the UK and 9 May in the US. The album peaked at number 18 in the British charts, while it performed poorly in the US.

Professional ratings
Review scores
Source	Rating
AllMusic	4/5 stars
MusicHound Rock	3.5/5 stars

The album was recorded in between legs of Queen's tours for The Game and Flash Gordon albums. Taylor wrote, produced, sang and performed all of the songs himself.

The album's credits state "P.P.S. 157 synthesizers", a joke referring to Queen's usual statement of "No synthesizers" in the liner notes of all albums up to The Game.

"Future Management" was issued as a single in Europe, while "Let's Get Crazy" was released in the US. The album was re-released as a digitally remastered CD in 1996.

== Cover ==
The original cover art was created by American artist Alex Nino. The piece was commissioned for the July 1980 issue of Creepy magazine. The back cover of the album shows Roger Taylor reading that issue.

The 'alien' writing on the magazine on the front cover consists mainly of upside down Hebrew characters. The actual words are meaningless.

== Track listing ==
All tracks are written by Roger Taylor.

Side one
No.	Title	Length
1.	"No Violins"	4:30
2.	"Laugh or Cry"	3:07
3.	"Future Management"	2:57
4.	"Let's Get Crazy"	3:42
5.	"My Country I & II"	6:55

Side two
No.	Title	Length
1.	"Good Times Are Now"	3:28
2.	"Magic Is Loose"	3:24
3.	"Interlude in Constantinople"	2:04
4.	"Airheads"	3:41
5.	"Fun in Space"	6:25

- Sides one and two were combined as tracks 1–10 on CD reissues.

Bonus tracks (2015 Hollywood Records reissue)
No.	Title	Length
1.	"I Wanna Testify (1977 non-album single version)"	3:45
2.	"Turn on the TV"	3:27
3.	"My Country (1981 single version)"	3:50
Total length:		10:22

== Personnel ==
- Roger Taylor – drums, percussion, lead and backing vocals, guitars, bass guitar, keyboards
- David Richards – engineer, approximately 50% of keyboards
- Hipgnosis – artwork, cover design

== Singles ==
- Future Management

A-Side: "Future Management"
B-Side: "Laugh Or Cry"
Released on 30 March 1981.
Reached #49 in the UK Singles Chart.
Released in the UK, Germany, The Netherlands, Italy, Spain, Portugal, Brazil and Ireland.

- Let's Get Crazy

A-Side: "Let's Get Crazy"
B-Side: "Laugh Or Cry"
Released on 15 May 1981.
Released in Japan, USA, Canada and Australia.

- My Country

A-Side: "My Country"
B-Side: "Fun In Space"
Released on 29 June 1981.
Did not chart.
Only released in the UK.

== Charts ==
Chart (1981)	Peak position
German Albums (Offizielle Top 100)	42
UK Albums (Official Charts)	18
