= I Can't Live with You =

1991 song by Queen

- Artwork for US release

Promotional single by Queen

from the album Innuendo
- Published: Queen Music Ltd.
- Released: 1991
- Recorded: 1990
- Genre: Power pop
- Length: 4:35 (album version); 4:47 (1997 Queen Rocks retake version)
- Label: Hollywood
- Songwriters: Queen (Brian May)
- Producers: Queen; David Richards

Queen singles chronology
"Headlong" (1991)	"I Can't Live with You" (1991)	"These Are the Days of Our Lives" (1991)

"I Can't Live with You" is a song by the British rock band Queen, which was released in 1991 as the fourth single from their fourteenth studio album Innuendo. The song was written by Brian May but credited to all four members of Queen. It was produced by Queen and David Richards. "I Can't Live with You" was released as a promotional single in the United States only, where it reached No. 28 on the Billboard Album Rock Tracks chart in June 1991.

== Writing ==
"I Can't Live with You" was originally intended for May's debut solo album, Back to the Light. It was recorded by Queen after the other three members of the band expressed their fondness for the track. In a 1991 interview with Guitar World, May said of the song, "As time goes by I find I'm more concerned with the lyrics than ever. A lot of people say you can only create when you're in pain. But when I was really in pain, I couldn't create anything. When you're climbing out and beginning to get things in the right boxes again, that's when you can put it into music. There's quite a bit of that sort of thing on this album. There's some in 'I Can't Live with You'; it's very personal, but I tried not to make it autobiographical because that narrows things too much. I tried to express it in a form that everyone can relate to."

== Recording ==
In his interview with Guitar World, May spoke about the difficulty of mixing the song, "For some reason, 'I Can't Live with You' was almost impossible to mix. It was one of those things where you put all the faders up and it sounds pretty good, and you think, 'We'll work on this for a couple of hours.' Then it gets worse and worse and worse. We kept going back to the rough mix. It's got an atmosphere to it. I think it sounds so special because we kept a lot of the demo stuff on it. Usually it all gets replaced."

== Release ==
For its release as a promotional single in the United States, American producer Brian Malouf remixed the original album track, which was dubbed the 'Malouf Mix'. The mix uses slightly different lead vocal tracks by Freddie Mercury, louder and tighter harmony tracks, and reprogrammed synth drums, resulting in a much more punchy and "over the top" poppy version than included on the album.

An alternative version of the song appeared on the 1997 compilation album Queen Rocks, billed as the "'97 Rocks Retake". It is said to be more along the lines of how May and Taylor originally wanted the track to sound, with a harder, guitar-driven rock edge and real drums instead of synth reprogrammed. The original version's vocal was used in this retake.

== Critical reception ==
On its release, Billboard praised the song as a "rhythmic tune, etched with Queen's signature layers of harmonies and Mercury's dramatic delivery". In a retrospective review of Innuendo, Greg Prato of AllMusic felt the song "shows the band's pop sensibilities in full force".

== Track listing ==
CD Promo Single

1. "I Can't Live with You" (Malouf Mix Edit) – 3:59
2. "I Can't Live with You" (Malouf Mix) – 4:33

== Personnel ==
- Freddie Mercury – lead and backing vocals
- Brian May – guitars, keyboards, backing vocals, drum programming
- Roger Taylor – backing vocals
- John Deacon – bass guitar
- David Richards – keyboards

== Charts ==
Chart (1991)	Peak position
US Billboard Album Rock Tracks	28
