= One Vision =

- UK single picture sleeve

Single by Queen

from the album A Kind of Magic and Iron Eagle
- A-side: "One Vision" (extended version) (12-inch single only)
- B-side: "Blurred Vision"
- Released: 4 November 1985
- Recorded: September 1985
- Genre: Hard rock; synth-rock
- Length: 5:11 (album version); 4:02 (single version); 6:28 (12-inch extended version); 4:38 (Classic Queen version)
- Label: EMI (UK); Capitol (US)
- Songwriters: Freddie Mercury; Brian May; Roger Taylor; John Deacon
- Producers: Queen; Reinhold Mack

Queen singles chronology
"Thank God It's Christmas" (1984)	"One Vision" (1985)	"A Kind of Magic" (1986)

Music videos
- "One Vision" on YouTube "One Vision" (Extended) on YouTube

"One Vision" is a song written and recorded by the British rock band Queen, first released as a single in November 1985 and then included on their 1986 album A Kind of Magic. It was conceived by the group's drummer Roger Taylor.

The song was inspired by the life and exploits of Martin Luther King Jr., with the lyrics recounting a man battling and overcoming the odds. In the 2011 BBC documentary, Queen: Days of Our Lives, Taylor stated his lyrics were "sort of half nicked off Martin Luther King's famous speech". The song's music video featured a "morphing" effect of the band's famous pose in 1975's "Bohemian Rhapsody" video to a 1985 version of the same pose. The song was included in all Queen's live concert performances of The Magic Tour, as the first song of each concert. They claimed they chose "One Vision" as the introduction song because its intro made a perfect concert introduction.

== Background and production ==
=== Production ===
"One Vision" was, for the most part, a group effort with no-one taking sole credit. This, however, made it more complicated to put the song together as nobody had the final say. A week was spent coming up with various ideas in the studio with four or five songs-worth of material to choose from, out of which came "One Vision".

The song's introduction was done with a Kurzweil K250 synthesizer. Mack acknowledged that lead singer Freddie Mercury wanted "lots of strange noises and swirling sounds", so he came into the studio one morning, sampled some of the vocal lines Mercury sang into the Kurzweil and toyed around with them by creating a downward pitch change and applying various effects to it. The ending was done in a similar fashion, with Mack playing the word sample "vision" repeatedly to create the jet-like sound that finishes the track. In fact, most of the keyboard parts in the song are K250 factory patches: for example, the main string sound is the "Fast String" preset.

To create the song's guitar sound, Brian May used his custom Pete Cornish distortion box to process his guitar signal before it was run through a pair of Vox AC30 amps with a simple MXR delay between them (slowly alternating between 7 milliseconds and 12 milliseconds) – using his Red Special guitar, as in most other Queen tracks. Moreover, the three-part guitar harmony heard in the last chorus was done with two AC30s. The lead guitar break was recorded later on at Maison Rouge Studios in London, using a single Gallien-Krueger amp – in the mix, Mack added a little reverb to the lead part while the rhythm parts were left completely dry.

The backing vocals consisted of three-part harmonies with an occasional fourth part, with each part sung and recorded three times by May, Taylor and Mercury. This, according to Mack, gave the song "a very full, final sound". All vocals, including Mercury's lead vocal part, were recorded with AKG C414 microphones.

The rhythmical section in the middle of the song was Taylor's Simmons kit triggered by a LinnDrum drum machine, along with some real drums played on top – to thicken the snare sound and make it "more cutting", a Simmons snare was sampled into an AMS delay and triggered along with the real snare. In that section there was some "live" Roland Jupiter-8 and a few guitar fills.

In terms of recording, three multitrack tapes were used throughout (as the process was rather vague), with two used for mixdown – a Studer A80 and A800. The song was mixed onto a Mitsubishi X80 digital stereo, a Sony PCM-F1 and a Studer A810. Reverbs used during mixdown include an EMT 252 (on the non-linear programme), an EMT 140 (on the bass drum), a Quantec room simulator and a Lexicon 224 (gated reverb).

=== Distorted vocals, intro and coda ===
The opening of "One Vision" contains pitch-shifted vocal sounds (which on the album and extended versions, also appear throughout Roger Taylor's drum section and in the end), most prominently the vocals retained in the single version.

The most prominent vocals of this type relay alternate lyrics when played forwards—they say, "God works in mysterious ways... mysterious ways...". It is clearly shown during the portions of the studio recording session of "One Vision" on both the Magic Years documentary and the DVD Greatest Video Hits II that Freddie Mercury sings the line.

There are various other altered vocal sounds as well but what they say is not known. Even more pitch-shifted vocals appear in "Blurred Vision". Finally, a version of the beginning pitch-shifted vocal sounds followed by other altered vocals without any music playing over them appears in the video game soundtrack of The eYe.

The VHS version of the 12 July Wembley show has the first part of the middle instrumental section of the studio version of "Brighton Rock" instead of the initial pitch-shifted vocals. The version of the song from the 11 July Wembley show is now included on the Queen Live at Wembley Stadium 25th Anniversary Edition DVD and the A Kind of Magic 2011 Deluxe CD. This version of the intro has never been used with a studio version of the song so far.

=== "Fried chicken" ===
The final line of the song (in the studio, live, and "Blurred Vision" versions, in the album and extended versions the line before the final "God works in mysterious ways... Mysterious ways...") is "fried chicken", although the lyrics say "one vision". This was the result of trying to come up with the proper wording of the song, and since it was not working, Freddie Mercury at some point introduced words that had nothing to do with the song for fun, as suggested by his partner, Jim Hutton. Some other made-up words during rehearsals were "one shrimp, one prawn, one clam, one chicken", a jokey mention of bassist John Deacon and some profanity.

=== Single B-side ===
An extensively remixed version of the song, titled "Blurred Vision" appears as the B-side of both the 7" and 12" single releases. It is exactly the same version on both formats. This is primarily an extended version of Taylor's drum section from the A-side. It retains the original ending, albeit with a longer version of the music from the end of the original's intro plus an additional non-altered sound over the final vocals "Vision vision vision vision..." (which are like those in the single version). It also repeats the existing pitch-shifted vocals, and adds new, less-prominent pitch-shifted vocals.

== Chart performance ==
"One Vision" became another hit single for Queen in many countries, reaching the top 40 in the Netherlands (number 21), Switzerland (number 24), and West Germany (number 26). It also had minor chart success on the US Billboard Hot 100, where it peaked at number 61, (but fared better on the Mainstream Rock Chart at number 19) and on the Canadian RPM 100 Singles chart, peaking at number 76. It became a big hit in the band's native United Kingdom, climbing to number seven on the UK Singles Chart, and in Ireland, where it reached number five. It also peaked at number 10 on Australia's Kent Music Report.

== Critical reception ==
Upon its release, Mike Gardner of Record Mirror remarked, "Queen do what they've always done best: crunch chords, mangle high opera and perform with an endearing flash and swagger – all executed in league with their bombastic energy. It's a magnificently gaudy catalogue of aural fireworks with a brotherhood of man message." Mark Booker of Number One described it as a "return to the Queen of old" and a "rock chant to rival" "We Will Rock You". He continued, "Couple this with the 'world harmony' sentiments and one of the premier voices in today's pop, and you can safely say that Queen will be sitting on the throne again in the near future." Charles Shaar Murray, writing for NME, stated that Queen "adopt the whompin' stompin' format" of Free's "All Right Now", with "a few overdubbed Van Halenisms from Brian May", to "trumpet the merits and virtues of non-racist, non-confrontational one-worldism". Dave Dickson of Kerrang! concluded that he "admire[s] the intention" but felt the song "fails on execution". He called it "a shade directionless, as though it can't quite make up its mind what it wants to be", but added that it is "great to hear Brian May back in the driving seat and the guitar to the fore".

In the US, Billboard commented, "Theme is the universal brotherhood of nations; sound is ornate melodic metal". Cash Box described it as the band's "hardest rocking single in years", with "Freddie Mercury at his best [and] the band sounding as powerful as they ever have". They concluded that the song "should regain Queen's high profile on American pop radio".

== Music video ==
The music video to "One Vision" which was recorded in September 1985 mainly showed the band recording the song at Musicland Studios in Munich and was the first to be directed and produced for Queen by Austrian directors Rudi Dolezal and Hannes Rossacher, also collectively known as DoRo. DoRo and Queen developed a fruitful working relationship which would result in numerous acclaimed and award-winning videos (for "Innuendo" and "The Show Must Go On", among others).

The video also featured a "morphing" effect of the band's famous pose in 1974's Queen II album cover and 1975's "Bohemian Rhapsody" video to a 1985 version of the same pose. The video even shows John Deacon on the drums. There was also a video made to match the 12" inch version of the song which appears on Queen Rocks The Video VHS and Queen: Greatest Video Hits 2 DVD.

An alternate version of the music video was produced splicing in scenes from the 1986 film Iron Eagle, with the standard video footage. The song was used multiple times during the training and battle scenes of the film, where the young hero, Doug Masters, plays the track on his cassette player and headphones. "One Vision" also appeared on the Iron Eagle soundtrack released in 1986.

Despite Queen's US popularity declining in the past few years, MTV still played the video in heavy rotation.

== Track listings ==
7" Single

A-Side: "One Vision" – 4:02

B-Side: "Blurred Vision" – 4:41

12" Single

A-Side: "One Vision" (Extended Vision) – 6:28

B-Side: "Blurred Vision" – 4:41

== Personnel ==
- Freddie Mercury – lead and backing vocals, sampler
- Brian May – guitars, synthesizer, sampler, backing vocals
- Roger Taylor – drums, electronic drums, backing vocals
- John Deacon – bass guitar

== Charts ==
Chart (1985–1986)	Peak position
Australia (Kent Music Report)	35
Belgium (Ultratop 50 Flanders)	28
Canada Top Singles (RPM)	76
Germany (GfK)	26
Ireland (IRMA)	5
Netherlands (Dutch Top 40)	21
Netherlands (Single Top 100)	21
Switzerland (Schweizer Hitparade)	24
UK Singles (Official Charts)	7
US Billboard Hot 100	61
US Mainstream Rock (Billboard)	19
West Germany (GfK)	26

Chart (2005)	Peak position
France (SNEP)	76

== Certifications ==
Region	Certification	Certified units/sales
United Kingdom (BPI)	Silver	200,000^{‡}
^{‡} Sales+streaming figures based on certification alone.
