= Ride the Wild Wind =

1991 song by Queen

Song by Queen

from the album Innuendo
- Released: 1991
- Recorded: 1990
- Studio: Metropolis Studios, London; Mountain Studios, Montreux, Switzerland
- Genre: Hard rock
- Length: 4:41
- Label: Parlophone (Europe); Hollywood (North America)
- Songwriters: Queen (Roger Taylor)
- Producers: Queen; David Richards

"Ride the Wild Wind" is a song by British rock band Queen. The song was written by Roger Taylor (but credited to Queen). It was originally released on their fourteenth studio album Innuendo in 1991.

== Composition ==
"Ride the Wild Wind" is written in the key of C Major with a mix of D minor and A minor. The song was composed by Taylor, who recorded a demo with his own vocals. The definitive version is sung by Mercury with Taylor on backing vocals. The song is a sort of sequel of Taylor's A Night at the Opera composition, "I'm in Love with My Car", which focused on Taylor's passion for cars and race. This time, the song involved all of the other members, that gave life to a fast song with beating drums and rhythmic bass line, eerily note-for-note similar to The Smiths' "Shakespeare's Sister", which create the sensation of speed and engine's roar. In the mid-part, a May solo, which accentuates the sense of high velocity, and also gives the song a heavier sound. In some parts, an Audi Quattro S1 Group B rally car can be heard.

== Personnel ==
- Freddie Mercury – lead vocals, keyboards
- Brian May – guitars
- Roger Taylor – drums, keyboards, co-lead vocals
- John Deacon – bass guitar
- David Richards – programming
