= A Winter's Tale (Queen song) =

1995 single by Queen

- Artwork for UK release

Single by Queen

from the album Made in Heaven
- B-side: "Thank God It's Christmas"; "Rock in Rio Blues" (live)
- Released: 11 December 1995
- Length: 3:49
- Label: Parlophone (Europe)
- Songwriter: Queen (Freddie Mercury)
- Producers: Queen; David Richards; Justin Shirley-Smith; Josh Macrae

Queen singles chronology
| "Heaven for Everyone" (1995) | "A Winter's Tale" (1995) | "I Was Born to Love You" (1996) |

Music video
- "A Winter's Tale" on YouTube

"A Winter's Tale" is a song by Queen, from the album Made in Heaven, released in 1995 after Freddie Mercury's death in 1991. It was written after the Innuendo sessions, inspired as Mercury was staring out the windows of various places in Montreux. The song has a psychedelic, dreamy feel, and describes what Mercury saw outside the windows.

== Composition and lyrics ==
Mercury wrote and composed the song, and also performed the vocals and keyboards (although the track is credited to Queen). According to May, Mercury wrote the song in a small house called "The Duck House" (seen on the album cover for Made in Heaven) in Montreux. In the 1995 documentary Queen: Champions of the World, it was stated that this was, if not the first, then an extremely rare style of recording for Mercury, as it was all performed in one take live in the studio. It was stated in the film that Mercury had always insisted upon music being completed prior to the vocal arrangement beginning, but acknowledged that he had little time left and there was not enough time to work on it differently. The guitar solo was recorded at Brian May’s home studio years after Mercury’s passing.

== Critical reception ==
British magazine Music Week gave "A Winter's Tale" three out of five, adding, "This is more ballsy and uplifting than the slightly corny Heaven For Everyone, but now the album is out, it may struggle to match its predecessor's number two success."

== Music video ==
The music video, produced after his death, resembled the form of an epitaph, as Mercury's actual written song notes were displayed alongside imagery and clips of Mercury's past performances.

== Track listings ==
CD single

1. "A Winter's Tale" – 3:49
2. "Thank God It's Christmas" – 4:18
3. "Rock in Rio Blues" (Live in Rio, January 1985) – 4:34

Alternative CD single

1. "A Winter's Tale" – 3:49
2. "Now I'm Here" – 4:13
3. "You're My Best Friend" – 2:50
4. "Somebody to Love" – 4:55

== Personnel ==
- Freddie Mercury – lead and backing vocals, keyboards
- Brian May – guitars, backing vocals
- Roger Taylor – drums, backing vocals
- John Deacon – bass guitar

== Charts ==
| Chart (1995–1996) | Peak position |
|---|---|
| Australia (ARIA) | 71 |
| Austria (Ö3 Austria Top 40) | 23 |
| Belgium (Ultratop 50 Flanders) | 33 |
| Belgium (Ultratop 50 Wallonia) | 34 |
| Finland (Suomen virallinen lista) | 10 |
| Germany (GfK) | 62 |
| Ireland (IRMA) | 23 |
| Italy (Musica e dischi) | 19 |
| Netherlands (Dutch Top 40) | 25 |
| Netherlands (Single Top 100) | 16 |
| Switzerland (Schweizer Hitparade) | 28 |
| UK Singles (Official Charts) | 6 |
