= The Show Must Go On (Queen song) =

1991 single by Queen

- Artwork for UK release

Single by Queen

from the album Innuendo and Greatest Hits II
- B-side: "Keep Yourself Alive" (UK); "Bohemian Rhapsody" (US)
- Released: 14 October 1991
- Recorded: 1990
- Genre: Hard rock; progressive rock
- Length: 4:31
- Label: Parlophone (Europe); Hollywood (US)
- Songwriter: Queen (Brian May)
- Producers: Queen; David Richards

Queen singles chronology
| "These Are the Days of Our Lives" (1991) | "The Show Must Go On" (1991) | "Stone Cold Crazy" (1991) |

Music video
- "The Show Must Go On" on YouTube

"The Show Must Go On" is a song by the British rock band Queen, released as the final track on their fourteenth studio album, Innuendo (1991). It was the last single issued before the death of frontman Freddie Mercury. Although credited to Queen, the song was written mainly by guitarist Brian May. The lyrics convey Mercury's resolve to continue working despite his deteriorating health, at a time when his HIV/AIDS diagnosis had not yet been publicly confirmed and media speculation was widespread.

During the 1990 sessions, Mercury's condition had worsened, and May questioned whether he would be able to record the demanding vocal. May later recalled: "I said, 'Fred, I don't know if this is going to be possible to sing.' And he went, 'I'll fucking do it, darling' — vodka down — and went in and killed it, completely lacerated that vocal".

The power ballad was released in the United Kingdom on 14 October 1991 to promote Greatest Hits II, six weeks before Mercury died. After his death on 24 November 1991, the single re-entered the UK Singles Chart and matched its original run of five weeks inside the top 75, peaking again at number 16. A live version with Elton John on vocals was later included on Greatest Hits III.

"The Show Must Go On" was first performed live on 20 April 1992 at The Freddie Mercury Tribute Concert, with Elton John singing lead vocals and Black Sabbath guitarist Tony Iommi on rhythm guitar. The song has since been performed by Queen + Paul Rodgers and Queen + Adam Lambert, with Rodgers describing one rendition as among the strongest of his career. It has also been used in film and television, including an operatic arrangement in Moulin Rouge!, and has been recorded by various artists.

== History and recording ==
After hearing John Deacon and Roger Taylor play the chord sequence that became the basis of the song, Brian May and Freddie Mercury agreed on the theme and drafted the initial lyrics. May completed the remaining words and melody, adding a bridge inspired by Pachelbel's Canon. He later noted that although he considered changing the title, Mercury insisted on keeping it.

Early demos included May singing the vocal line, with some passages in falsetto. When presenting the final demo, May questioned whether Mercury would be able to record the demanding part due to his declining health. Mercury reportedly reassured him and delivered the studio performance.

May recorded most of the backing vocals and played the Korg M1 synthesiser in addition to guitar. Harmonically, the song begins in B minor, modulates to C♯ minor, and returns to B minor, creating a brief sense of lift before resolving. Producer David Richards suggested the key change in the second verse.

According to May, the song evolved from a simple chord sequence into a piece that allowed the band to address subjects that were difficult to discuss openly at the time. The lyrics use metaphors and allusions to express resolve in the face of physical decline, including lines such as "my make-up may be flaking" and "my smile still stays on". Mercury's partner Jim Hutton later described the lyric about make-up as reflecting Mercury's attitude during his final months, noting that he "always wore a brave face" despite his illness.

== Promotional video ==
With Mercury's health having declined severely due to complications from HIV/AIDS, no new footage of him was filmed for the promotional video. Instead, the clip was assembled as a montage of Queen's music videos from 1981 to 1991, serving as a lead‑in to the release of Greatest Hits II, which covered the same period. The montage draws on numerous 1980s promo videos, with the exception of "Under Pressure" and "Hammer to Fall". Among the videos included are "I Want to Break Free", "Friends Will Be Friends", "I'm Going Slightly Mad", "Breakthru", "Radio Ga Ga", "I Want It All", "The Miracle", "The Invisible Man", "Headlong", "Calling All Girls", "Body Language", "Innuendo", "Back Chat", "Who Wants to Live Forever", "Scandal" and "One Vision".

The montage, combined with the tone of the song's lyrics, intensified ongoing media speculation about Mercury's health, despite continued official denials. One month later, Mercury publicly confirmed that he had AIDS, and he died less than 24 hours after the announcement. The video was compiled and edited by the Austrian directing duo DoRo, consisting of Rudi Dolezal and Hannes Rossacher.

== Live recordings ==
- During the Freddie Mercury Tribute Concert at Wembley Stadium in London in 1992, the surviving members of Queen performed "The Show Must Go On" with Elton John and Tony Iommi of Black Sabbath. The concert was later issued on DVD in 2002 for its tenth anniversary.
- At the Théâtre National de Chaillot in Paris in 1997, Queen performed the song with Elton John and the Béjart Ballet. This version appears on Greatest Hits III. It was also the final public performance to include bassist John Deacon, who retired from music afterward.
- At the 2006 VH1 Rock Honors held at the Mandalay Bay Events Center in Las Vegas, Queen + Paul Rodgers performed "The Show Must Go On" along with "Under Pressure", "We Will Rock You" and "We Are the Champions" during the live broadcast.
- At the 2011 MTV Europe Music Awards, Queen closed the ceremony with Adam Lambert on vocals, performing "The Show Must Go On", "We Will Rock You" and "We Are the Champions".
- On 28 August 2020, Queen + Adam Lambert released a live version recorded at the O_{2} Arena in London on 4 July 2018 as a preview for the live album Live Around the World.

== Formats and track listing ==
- UK 7-inch single
1. "The Show Must Go On" – 4:31
2. "Keep Yourself Alive" – 3:46
- UK 12-inch and CD single
1. "The Show Must Go On" – 4:31
2. "Keep Yourself Alive" – 3:46
3. "Queen Talks" – 1:43
4. "Body Language" (CD singles only) – 4:32
- UK special CD single
1. "The Show Must Go On" – 4:31
2. "Now I'm Here" – 4:12
3. "Fat Bottomed Girls" – 4:15
4. "Las Palabras de Amor" – 4:30

== Personnel ==
- Freddie Mercury – lead vocals
- Brian May – guitars, keyboards, programming, backing vocals
- Roger Taylor – drums, backing vocals
- John Deacon – bass guitar

== Charts ==
=== Weekly charts ===
1991–1992 weekly chart performance
| Chart (1991–1992) | Peak position |
|---|---|
| Australia (ARIA) | 75 |
| Belgium (Ultratop 50 Flanders) | 22 |
| Europe (Eurochart Hot 100) | 19 |
| Europe (European Hit Radio) | 22 |
| Finland (Suomen Virallinen) | 15 |
| France (SNEP) | 2 |
| Germany (GfK) | 7 |
| Ireland (IRMA) | 17 |
| Italy (Musica e dischi) | 5 |
| Netherlands (Dutch Top 40) | 7 |
| Netherlands (Single Top 100) | 6 |
| New Zealand (Recorded Music NZ) | 20 |
| Sweden (Sverigetopplistan) | 30 |
| Switzerland (Schweizer Hitparade) | 11 |
| UK Singles (Official Charts) | 16 |
| UK Airplay (Music Week) | 15 |
| US Mainstream Rock (Billboard) | 40 |

2022 weekly chart performance
| Chart (2022) | Peak position |
|---|---|
| Poland Airplay (ZPAV) | 74 |

=== Year-end charts ===
1991 year-end chart performance
| Chart (1991) | Position |
|---|---|
| Italy (Musica e dischi) | 92 |
| Netherlands (Dutch Top 40) | 95 |

1992 year-end chart performance
| Chart (1992) | Position |
|---|---|
| Germany (Media Control) | 46 |

== Certifications ==
Certifications
| Region | Certification | Certified units/sales |
|---|---|---|
| Brazil (Pro-Música Brasil) | Gold | 30,000^{‡} |
| France (SNEP) | Silver | 125,000^{*} |
| Germany (BVMI) | Gold | 300,000^{‡} |
| Italy (FIMI) | Platinum | 50,000^{‡} |
| New Zealand (RMNZ) | Platinum | 30,000^{‡} |
| Spain (Promusicae) | Platinum | 60,000^{‡} |
| United Kingdom (BPI) | Platinum | 600,000^{‡} |
| United States (RIAA) | Gold | 500,000^{^} |
^{*} Sales figures based on certification alone.^{^} Shipments figures based on certification alone.^{‡} Sales+streaming figures based on certification alone.

== Release history ==
Release history
| Region | Date | Format | Label | Ref. |
|---|---|---|---|---|
| United Kingdom | 14 October 1991 | 7-inch vinyl; 12-inch vinyl; CD | Parlophone | |
| United Kingdom | 21 October 1991 | CD box set | Parlophone | |
| Australia | 18 November 1991 | Cassette; CD | Parlophone | |

== Celine Dion version ==
"The Show Must Go On"

Single by Celine Dion featuring Lindsey Stirling
- Released: 20 May 2016
- Recorded: 2016
- Genre: Pop
- Length: 4:25 (main version); 3:30 (radio edit)
- Label: Columbia
- Producer: Humberto Gatica

Celine Dion singles chronology
| "Incredible" (2014) | "The Show Must Go On" (2016) | "Encore un soir" (2016) |

Lindsey Stirling singles chronology
| "Dying for You" (2016) | "The Show Must Go On" (2016) | "The Arena" (2016) |

Audio
- "The Show Must Go On" on YouTube

Celine Dion recorded a studio version of Queen's "The Show Must Go On" and released it as a digital single on 20 May 2016. The track features violinist Lindsey Stirling.

=== Background and release ===
Dion first performed "The Show Must Go On" in 2007, delivering a tribute to Freddie Mercury on a TF1 television special alongside French singers Christophe Maé and David Hallyday. The song later became part of her Taking Chances World Tour (2008), with performances included on Taking Chances World Tour: The Concert and Celine: Through the Eyes of the World (2010). Since 2015, it has also featured in her Las Vegas residency, Celine.

On 22 May 2016, Dion performed the song at the 2016 Billboard Music Awards, where she received the Icon Award. The appearance marked her first performance outside the Colosseum at Caesars Palace following the January 2016 death of her husband, René Angélil. Critics praised the performance, and the live video was released on YouTube and Vevo on 3 June 2016. She continued performing the song during her 2016 and 2017 tours.

The studio version was released on 20 May 2016 on iTunes, Amazon.com and other digital platforms, and made available on streaming services including YouTube and Vevo.

=== Commercial performance ===
In France, "The Show Must Go On" debuted at number 23 with first‑week sales of 1,000 copies. In Canada, it entered the Hot Digital Songs chart at number 23. It also debuted at number 89 on the Canadian Hot 100. In Quebec, the track opened at number one on the ADISQ chart. In the United States, it reached number 45 on the Pop Digital Songs chart. In Belgium's Wallonia region, it peaked at number 47 on the Ultratip chart.

=== Charts ===
Weekly chart performance
| Chart (2016) | Peak position |
|---|---|
| Belgium (Ultratip Bubbling Under Wallonia) | 47 |
| Canada Hot 100 (Billboard) | 89 |
| France (SNEP) | 23 |
| Quebec Digital Song Sales (ADISQ) | 1 |
| Switzerland (Media Control Romandy) | 17 |
| South Africa Airplay (EMA) | 38 |
| US Pop Digital Songs (Billboard) | 45 |

=== Release history ===
Release history
| Region | Date | Format | Label | Ref. |
|---|---|---|---|---|
| Various | 20 May 2016 | Digital download; streaming | Columbia | |
| Italy | 22 July 2016 | Contemporary hit radio | Columbia | |
