= Brighton Rock (song) =

Song by Queen

from the album Sheer Heart Attack
- Published: Queen Music Ltd.
- Released: 8 November 1974
- Recorded: July–September 1974
- Studio: AIR; Rockfield; Trident; Wessex Sound
- Genre: Hard rock *pop metal
- Length: 5:11
- Label: EMI (UK); Parlophone (Europe); Elektra (US)
- Songwriter: Brian May
- Producers: Roy Thomas Baker; Queen

"Brighton Rock" is a song by British rock band Queen, written by lead guitarist Brian May. The song is the opening track on their 1974 third studio album Sheer Heart Attack. The song features one of Queen's longest guitar solos which is more than three minutes long. The solo has been performed live by Brian May at most concerts since its release. The song gained popularity after its prominent use in the 2017 Edgar Wright film Baby Driver.

== History ==
May wrote the song shortly before the completion of Queen II in 1973, but because the band did not have enough time to record it, it was not included. Before the song was recorded in 1974, variations of the solo were part of "Son and Daughter".

The song, the first track on the 1974 album Sheer Heart Attack, tells the story of two young lovers named Jenny and Jimmy meeting in Brighton on a public holiday. Jenny cannot linger because she is afraid her mother will find out "how I spent my holiday", but afterwards "writes a letter every day"; Jimmy, who was eager on the day, responds that he is afraid of discovery by "my lady".

The song samples the track "Carnival Midway" from stock sound effect library series titled Authentic Sound Effects compiled by Jac Holzman who signed Queen to Elektra Records in the US. During the sound effect, it features the song "I Do Like to Be Beside the Seaside" whistled by Roy Thomas Baker, which goes back to the previous song "Seven Seas of Rhye" at the end of Queen II.

The song was listed among Guitar World's Top 100 Greatest Guitar Solos of All Time, ranking at #41.

The song was prominently featured in two scenes in the 2017 Edgar Wright film Baby Driver: early in the film, when Baby (portrayed by Ansel Elgort) and Buddy van Horn (portrayed by Jon Hamm) discuss it and Baby describes it as "his killer track", and during the climactic face-off between Baby and Buddy, who plays the song on his car stereo because of the earlier conversation. The song's usage in the film and its soundtrack led to a resurgence of popularity for the track.

== Live performances ==
The song is probably best known for its lengthy guitar solo interlude. This featured May's technique of using multiple echoes used to build up guitar harmony and contrapuntal melodic lines. The studio version only contains one "main" guitar and one "echoed" guitar for a short section, but live, he would usually split his guitar signal into "main" and two "echoed", with each going to a separate bank of amplifiers.

The live piece is often between 9 and 13 minutes long. May performed part of the "Brighton Rock" solo at the closing ceremony of the 2012 Summer Olympics in London.

== Personnel ==
- Freddie Mercury – lead and backing vocals
- Brian May – guitars, backing and lead vocals (bridge)
- Roger Taylor – drums, backing vocals
- John Deacon – bass guitar
