= Thank God It's Christmas =

1984 single by Queen

- UK single picture sleeve

Single by Queen
- B-side: "Man on the Prowl" (12" incl. extended version); "Keep Passing the Open Windows"; (12" extended version)
- Released: 26 November 1984 (UK); 27 November 1984 (US)
- Recorded: 1984
- Genre: Christmas, rock
- Length: 4:19
- Label: EMI (UK); Capitol (US)
- Songwriters: Brian May; Roger Taylor
- Producers: Queen; Reinhold Mack

Queen singles chronology
"Hammer to Fall" (1984)	"Thank God It's Christmas" (1984)	"One Vision" (1985)

Music video
- "Thank God It's Christmas" on YouTube

"Thank God It's Christmas" is a Christmas single by the British rock band Queen. It was written by lead guitarist Brian May and drummer Roger Taylor. Released on 26 November 1984, the single spent six weeks in the UK charts over Christmas 1984 and new year of 1985, and peaked at number 21.

The song was not originally released on any Queen studio album, appearing only on Queen's Greatest Hits III, released in 1999, and as the B-side of the single "A Winter's Tale" from the 1995 album Made in Heaven. However, the track was finally included on the bonus EP packaged with the deluxe edition of their album The Works, remastered and re-released in 2011.

It appears on the Christmas compilation LP The Edge of Christmas in its full 12" version with the drum intro. It also appears on the US-only compilation boxed-set The Queen Collection, which consisted of a re-release of the LPs Classic Queen and Queen's Greatest Hits along with a bonus CD called Queen Talks that included this song, along with a 1989 interview with the band.

In November 2026 a new version of the song was released, featuring additional musical elements added by Roger Taylor and Brian May, including newly-recorded drums and backing vocals. Re-titled "Thank God It's Christmas...Again!", the song was released on 16 November in a full version and a radio edit.

== Music video ==
Upon its original release, no promotional video was filmed for the track, with shows often using footage of live performances in lieu of an official promotional music video. In a 2018 interview with Ultimate Classic Rock, Brian May attributed the single's underwhelming chart performance to the lack of a music video.

In 2019, an animated music video was produced. The animation, directed by Justin Moon and Drew Gleason, depicted a wintery evening scene, with people enjoying each other's company during the Christmas season. The video was released in December 2019 on the Queen Official YouTube channel.

== Critical reception ==
Upon its release, Howard Johnson of Kerrang! remarked that "even Freddie's excellent vox can't disguise that this is blandola naffola" and added, "The boys should quite honestly have employed themselves doing something a little more useful, like buying Fisher-Price toys for the kiddies."

== Track listings ==
=== 7" single ===
Side one
No.	Title	Writer(s)	Length
1.	"Thank God It's Christmas"	Brian May; Roger Taylor	4:22

Side two
No.	Title	Writer(s)	Length
1.	"Man on the Prowl" (album version)	Freddie Mercury	3:30
2.	"Keep Passing the Open Windows" (album version)	Mercury	5:22

=== 12" single ===
Side one
No.	Title	Writer(s)	Length
1.	"Thank God It's Christmas"	May; Taylor	4:19

Side two
No.	Title	Writer(s)	Length
1.	"Man on the Prowl" (Extended Version)	Mercury	6:02
2.	"Keep Passing the Open Windows" (extended version)	Mercury	6:50

== Personnel ==
- Freddie Mercury – lead and backing vocals
- Brian May – electric guitar, synthesizer, backing vocals
- Roger Taylor – drums, drum machine, sleigh bells, synthesizer, backing vocals
- John Deacon – bass guitar

== Charts ==
=== Weekly charts ===
1984 weekly chart performance for "Thank God It's Christmas"
Chart (1984)	Peak position
UK Singles Chart	21
Irish Singles Chart	8
Chart (1985)	Peak position
Austrian Singles Chart	21
Belgium (Ultratop 50 Flanders)	11
German Singles Chart	57

Chart (2013)	Peak position
Slovenia Airplay (SloTop50)	29

Chart (2014)	Peak position
Slovenia Airplay (SloTop50)	28

Chart (2015)	Peak position
Danish Singles Chart	36
Poland Airplay (ZPAV)	39
Slovenia Airplay (SloTop50)	38

Chart (2016)	Peak position
Slovenia Airplay (SloTop50)	22

Chart (2017)	Peak position
Germany (GfK)	18
Slovenia Airplay (SloTop50)	15
Switzerland (Schweizer Hitparade)	47

Chart (2018–2019)	Peak position
Australia (ARIA)	80
Austria (Ö3 Austria Top 40)	16
Denmark (Tracklisten)	34
Germany (GfK)	16
Hungary (Editors' Choice Top 40)	40
Italy (FIMI)	79
Netherlands (Single Top 100)	26
Poland Airplay (ZPAV)	43
Slovenia Airplay (SloTop50)	11
Switzerland (Schweizer Hitparade)	36

Chart (2019–2020)	Peak position
Austria (Ö3 Austria Top 40)	15
Poland Airplay (ZPAV)	50
Slovenia Airplay (SloTop50)	17
UK Singles (Official Charts)	86

Chart (2020–2021)	Peak position
Denmark (Tracklisten)	32
Germany (GfK)	8
Netherlands (Single Top 100)	22
Poland Airplay (ZPAV)	45
Portugal (AFP)	171
Slovenia Airplay (SloTop50)	14
Global 200 (Billboard)	158

Chart (2021–2022)	Peak position
Czech Republic Airplay (ČNS IFPI)	36
Denmark (Tracklisten)	28
Lithuania (AGATA)	92
Poland Airplay (ZPAV)	32
Portugal (AFP)	105
Switzerland (Schweizer Hitparade)	29
UK Singles (Official Charts)	88

Chart (2022–2023)	Peak position
Denmark (Tracklisten)	28
Italy (FIMI)	68
Poland Airplay (ZPAV)	51
Slovakia Airplay (ČNS IFPI)	43
Switzerland (Schweizer Hitparade)	23
UK Singles (Official Charts)	79

Chart (2023–2024)	Peak position
Croatia International Airplay (Top lista)	13
France (SNEP)	77
Global 200 (Billboard)	141
Italy (FIMI)	57
Netherlands (Single Top 100)	19
Poland (Polish Airplay Top 100)	43
Poland (Polish Streaming Top 100)	36
Slovakia Airplay (ČNS IFPI)	39
Switzerland (Schweizer Hitparade)	22
UK Singles (Official Charts)	76

Chart (2024–2025)	Peak position
Estonia Airplay (TopHit)	27
France (SNEP)	45
Global 200 (Billboard)	73
Poland (Polish Airplay Top 100)	43
Poland (Polish Streaming Top 100)	37
Romania Airplay (TopHit)	61
Slovenia Airplay (Radiomonitor)	6
UK Singles (Official Charts)	74

Chart (2025–2026)	Peak position
Global 200 (Billboard)	64
Greece International (IFPI)	83
Poland (Polish Airplay Top 100)	42
Poland (Polish Streaming Top 100)	58
Portugal (AFP)	105
Sweden Heatseeker (Sverigetopplistan)	3
UK Singles (Official Charts)	79

=== Monthly charts ===
Monthly chart performance for "Thank God It's Christmas"
Chart (2025)	Peak position
Romania Airplay (TopHit)	85

== Certifications ==
Region	Certification	Certified units/sales
Denmark (IFPI Danmark)	Platinum	90,000^{‡}
Germany (BVMI)	Platinum	500,000^{‡}
New Zealand (RMNZ)	Platinum	30,000^{‡}
United Kingdom (BPI)	Gold	500,000^{‡}
^{‡} Sales+streaming figures based on certification alone.
