= Headlong (song) =

1991 single by Queen

- Artwork for UK release

Single by Queen

from the album Innuendo
- B-side: "All God's People"
- Released: 13 May 1991
- Genre: Hard rock; heavy metal
- Length: 4:38 (album version); 3:47 (radio edit)
- Label: Parlophone (Europe); Hollywood (North America)
- Songwriter: Queen (Brian May)
- Producers: Queen; David Richards

Queen singles chronology
"I'm Going Slightly Mad" (1991)	"Headlong" (1991)	"I Can't Live with You" (1991)

Alternative cover
- Artwork for US release

Music video
- "Headlong" on YouTube

"Headlong" is a song by British rock band Queen, released as the third single from their fourteenth studio album, Innuendo in May 1991. The song was written by Queen guitarist Brian May, who intended to record it for his then-upcoming solo album Back to the Light (1992), but when he heard Queen lead singer Freddie Mercury sing the track, he allowed it to become a Queen song. As with all the songs on Innuendo, the track was promptly credited to the entire band.

The song was released as the lead single from the album in the United States under their contract with Hollywood Records on 14 January 1991, and charted on the Album Rock Tracks chart, reaching number three. When Innuendo was remastered in 2011, a version of the song with May on lead vocals instead of Mercury was released.

The cover of one of the CD singles is inspired by Grandville illustrations, as are all of the other singles from the album.

== Critical reception ==
Upon its release as a single in the US, Larry Flick of Billboard noted how Queen "drops their trademark vocal acrobatics into a speedy, guitar-based arrangement" and called it a "strong album rock contender, though pop will likely take a pass". Kent Zimmerman of the Gavin Report remarked that Brian May "steps to the forefront as Queen returns to the rock fold" and added how "layers and layers of guitar and matching vocals are frighteningly consistent as Queen backbeats past the twenty year mark with enviable vitality". Pan-European magazine Music & Media considered "Headlong" to be "the kind of hard rock that Van Halen would be jealous of" and added, "EHR programmers shouldn't be afraid: it's loud but it's also melodic."

== Chart performance ==
"Headlong" was the third single release from the album Innuendo in the band's native UK. Released in May 1991, it entered the UK singles chart at number 28 in its first week and peaked at number 14 during the following week. In total the song spent 3 weeks within the UK top 40. It was the second highest-charting song, off of the album, after the song "Innuendo", which had reached the top of the charts.

== Promotional video ==
The accompanying music video for "Headlong" was one of the final Queen videos shot with lead singer Freddie Mercury, some 12 months before his death from AIDS, though it was actually shot before the "I'm Going Slightly Mad" video (released as the second single in the UK). The video showed the band in the studio performing the song (in a stage-like setup), as well as shots of the band working in the studio. The version of the song in the video includes an extra short section after the second chorus not released in any audio format to date.

The performance footage (Mercury wearing a yellow sweater) was shot in December 1990 and the studio footage (of Mercury wearing two different blue shirts) in November 1990, both at Metropolis Studios in London (the exterior of which is shown at the beginning and the end of the video). The footage were part of the Innuendo EPK filmed at Metropolis Studios at the end of 1990. This is also the last colour video of Freddie Mercury, whose health was declining due to the HIV virus which would claim his life on 24 November the following year. The next videos, "I'm Going Slightly Mad" and "These Are the Days of Our Lives" were recorded during February and May 1991 respectively, both in black-and-white.

Like all other videos for the Innuendo album, the "Headlong" clip was directed by Austrian director team DoRo, consisting of Rudi Dolezal and Hannes Rossacher, who had been regularly working for Queen since the video for the 1986 single "Friends Will Be Friends".

== B-sides ==
"All God's People" and "Mad the Swine" accompanied "Headlong" on the flip side. The former alone, on the UK 7-inch single release and both tracks on the UK 12-inch release. "All God's People" is taken from the album Innuendo, where as "Mad the Swine" is a very early, previously unreleased song from 1972.

== Track listings ==
- US Cassette single

A. "Headlong" – 3:48
B. "Under Pressure" – 4:05

- 7-inch single

A. "Headlong" – 4:38
B. "All God's People" – 4:21

- 12-inch and CD single
1. "Headlong" – 4:38
2. "All God's People" – 4:21
3. "Mad the Swine" – 3:19

== Personnel ==
- Freddie Mercury – lead and backing vocals
- Brian May – guitars, piano, keyboards, drum programming, backing vocals
- Roger Taylor – drums, backing vocals
- John Deacon – bass guitar

== Charts ==
Chart (1991)	Peak position
Australia (ARIA)	119
Canada	25
Ireland (IRMA)	25
Luxembourg (Radio Luxembourg)	17
Netherlands (Dutch Tipparade 40)	4
Netherlands (Single Top 100)	43
UK Singles (OCC)	14
UK Airplay (Music Week)	20
US Mainstream Rock Chart (Billboard)	3
US AOR Track Chart (Radio & Records)	2

== Release history ==
Region	Date	Format(s)	Label(s)	Ref.
United States	14 January 1991	Cassette	Hollywood	
Australia	8 April 1991	7-inch vinyl; cassette	Parlophone; EMI	
United Kingdom	13 May 1991	7-inch vinyl; 12-inch vinyl; CD; cassette	Parlophone	
Australia	27 May 1991	CD	Parlophone; EMI	
Japan	16 October 1991	CD	EMI	
