= These Are the Days of Our Lives =

1991 single by Queen

- Artwork for US release

Single by Queen

from the album Innuendo
- A-side: "Bohemian Rhapsody"
- B-side: "Bijou" (US)
- Released: 5 September 1991
- Recorded: March 1989 – November 1990
- Studio: Metropolis (London, England); Mountain (Montreux, Switzerland)
- Length: 4:13
- Label: Parlophone (Europe); Hollywood (North America)
- Songwriter: Queen (Roger Taylor)
- Producers: Queen; David Richards

Queen singles chronology
| "I Can't Live with You" (1991) | "These Are the Days of Our Lives" (1991) | "The Show Must Go On" (1991) |
| "Stone Cold Crazy" (1991) | "Bohemian Rhapsody" / "These Are the Days of Our Lives" (1991) | "Ride the Wild Wind" (1992) |

Second Issue
- Artwork for 1991 UK release

Music video
- "These Are the Days of Our Lives" on YouTube

"These Are the Days of Our Lives" is a song by the British rock band Queen. Although credited to the whole band, it was largely written by their drummer Roger Taylor, and is the eighth track on the band's 1991 album Innuendo.

The song was released as a single in the United States on Freddie Mercury's 45th birthday, 5 September 1991, and as double A-side single in Ireland and the United Kingdom on 9 December, in the wake of Mercury's death, with the Queen track "Bohemian Rhapsody". The double A-side debuted at number one on the UK Singles Chart and remained there for five weeks, topped the Irish Singles Chart for six weeks, and reached number 16 in Germany. The song was awarded a Brit Award for British Single of the Year in 1992. In 1999, it was included on Queen's compilation album Greatest Hits III.

== Background ==
Reminiscing on the past, Roger Taylor penned the song as Freddie Mercury's health was deteriorating. As a teenager, Taylor had known Mercury since the late 1960s when they worked together at Kensington Market in London before the two (along with Brian May) founded Queen in 1970. The opening chorus in the song reminisces, with "Those were the days of our lives", while the second chorus refers to the present, "Cause these are the days of our lives".

I was sitting at home in a rather reflective mood and I did know that Freddie was ill, and I think it came out of that slightly melancholic mood. I guess I was trying to put an optimistic slant on it in a way—those were the days then. And these are the days of our lives—Today is more important than yesterday.

— Taylor speaking to Absolute Radio in 2011.

== Music video ==
The video was the last Queen video to feature Freddie Mercury in person before his death on 24 November 1991. Rudi Dolezal and Hannes Rossacher of DoRo Productions filmed the music video at studios in London on 30 May 1991.

He knew how ill he was, and that this was the last time he'd ever be in front of a camera. He must have had terrible pain, but you don't see that. You just see a man and his destiny. Regardless [of] whether he was in pain or not, he always delivered. He didn't want any special treatment.

— Video director Rudi Dolezal in a 2019 interview with People magazine on Mercury's last video.

Mercury, Roger Taylor and John Deacon were present at the shoot; Brian May was filmed later in the year and added in digitally, as he was out of the country on a promotional tour at the time of the shoot. Following rumours about Mercury's health, the video was filmed and released in black-and-white to hide the full extent of his illness.

In the video, Mercury wears a waistcoat with pictures of cats that was made for him by Queen costume designer Diana Moseley. With his farewell look straight at the camera as the song ends, Mercury whispers "I still love you", directed to his fans, which are his last words on camera. Video director Dolezal had been told beforehand to keep things speedy due to Mercury's ailing condition, but before shooting wrapped, Mercury requested one more take for the last lyrics of the song: "Those days are gone now but one thing's still true / When I look and I find I still love you". Jordan Runtagh for People writes, "On the last line, he summons all his strength for a final heroic pose before collapsing into himself with a soft laugh. Staring through the camera, he whispers a final "I still love you" before snapping his fingers, walking out of frame with a flourish". Dolezal comments, "In these last few seconds of that song, he gives us a résumé of his whole life: 'I was a big superstar, but don't take it too seriously.' And then, 'I still love you,' which is to the fans. Then he walks out of life. Even in his last moments, he planned his exit artistically. That's how he wanted it to be."

The US version of the video features animation produced by Walt Disney Studios, as Queen's North American record label, Hollywood Records, is a subsidiary of The Walt Disney Company. Another video version was released in 1992 to promote the Classic Queen compilation album in the US, combining old footage of the band from 1973 to 1991 plus the performances of the band from the US aired video.

== Live performances and covers ==
The song was first played live on 20 April 1992 at the Freddie Mercury Tribute Concert, sung by George Michael and Lisa Stansfield. The live version was included on the 1993 EP Five Live, credited to 'George Michael with Queen & Lisa Stansfield'.

The song was played on the 2005/2006 Queen + Paul Rodgers tours with vocals provided by Roger Taylor. On stage the song was accompanied by a video of the band in their early days in Japan, including many shots focusing on past band members Freddie Mercury and John Deacon.

The song was used on 1 July 2007 at the Concert for Diana held at the redeveloped Wembley Stadium, London in honour of Diana, Princess of Wales, who had died almost 10 years earlier. At the end of the concert, a video montage of Diana as a child was presented while the song was playing in the background. A cover version by Petula Clark is included on her 2008 compilation album Then & Now.

== Reception ==
Ron Hart of Rolling Stone wrote that "the conga-driven synth ballad 'These Are the Days of Our Lives' is Innuendo's most significant single [...] A ballad in the vein of 'Love of My Life,' it was a song that carried a significant amount of weight given the frailty of Mercury's appearance in the black-and-white video, later compounded when unreleased colour footage from the filming emerged in Days of Our Lives."

== Track listings ==
First Issue

Cassette
| No. | Title | Length |
|---|---|---|
| 1. | "These Are the Days of Our Lives" | 4:10 |
| 2. | "Bijou" | 3:36 |

US Modern rock promotional single
| No. | Title | Length |
|---|---|---|
| 1. | "These Are the Days of Our Lives" | 4:18 |
| 2. | "These Are the Days of Our Lives" (Edit) | 3:54 |

US Contemporary hit promotional single
| No. | Title | Length |
|---|---|---|
| 1. | "These Are the Days of Our Lives" | 4:10 |

Second Issue

CD, CT, 7"
| No. | Title | Length |
|---|---|---|
| 1. | "Bohemian Rhapsody" | 6:00 |
| 2. | "These Are the Days of Our Lives" | 4:15 |

== Personnel ==
Queen

- Freddie Mercury – lead and backing vocals, keyboards
- Brian May – guitars, backing vocals
- Roger Taylor – drums, percussion, keyboards, backing vocals
- John Deacon – bass guitar

with:

- David Richards – keyboards, programming

== Accolades ==
| Year | Ceremony | Award | Result |
|---|---|---|---|
| 1992 | Brit Awards | British Single of the Year | Won |

== Charts ==
=== Weekly charts ===
| Chart (1991–1992) | Peak position |
|---|---|
| Belgium (Ultratop 50 Flanders) | 40 |
| Germany (GfK) with "Bohemian Rhapsody" | 16 |
| Ireland (IRMA) with "Bohemian Rhapsody" | 1 |
| Luxembourg (Radio Luxembourg) with "Bohemian Rhapsody" | 1 |
| UK Singles (Official Charts) with "Bohemian Rhapsody" | 1 |
| UK Airplay (Music Week) | 21 |

| Chart (2021) | Peak position |
|---|---|
| UK Singles Downloads (Official Charts) | 81 |

=== Year-end charts ===
| Chart (1991) | Position |
|---|---|
| UK Singles (OCC) | 2 |

| Chart (1992) | Position |
|---|---|
| UK Singles (OCC) | 15 |

== Certifications ==
| Region | Certification | Certified units/sales |
|---|---|---|
| United Kingdom (BPI) | Silver | 200,000^{‡} |
| United Kingdom (BPI) with "Bohemian Rhapsody" | Platinum | 600,000^{^} |
^{^} Shipments figures based on certification alone.^{‡} Sales+streaming figures based on certification alone.

== Release history ==
| Country | Date | Format | Label | Catalog no. |
First Issue
| United States | August 1991 | Promo CD-R (Modern Rock / Alternative radio) | Hollywood Records | PRCD-10061-2 |
| United States | 5 September 1991 | 7-inch, CS | Hollywood Records | 64868 4 (7-inch); HR-64868-4 (CT) |
| United States | 1991 | Promo CD-R (Contemporary hit radio) | Hollywood Records | PRCD-8390-2 |
Second Issue
| Europe | 9 December 1991 | 7-inch, CD, Cassette | EMI, Parlophone | 016 2046497, QUEEN 20 (7-inch); 2046492, CDQUEEN 20 (CD); 300201 4 (CS) |
| United Kingdom | 9 December 1991 | 7-inch, CD, Cassette | EMI, Parlophone | 2046497, QUEEN 20 (7-inch); 2046492, CDQUEEN 20 (CD); 2046494, TCQUEEN 20 (CT) |
| Australia | 1992 | CT | EMI, Parlophone | TC-2046494 |
| Japan | 8 July 1992 | CD | EMI, Parlophone | TOCP-7259 |
