= Innuendo (album) =

Studio album by Queen
- Released: 4 February 1991
- Recorded: March 1989 – November 1990
- Studios: Metropolis (London); Mountain (Montreux)
- Genres: Hard rock; progressive rock
- Length: 53:48 (original CD); 48:13 (original LP)
- Labels: Parlophone; Hollywood
- Producers: Queen; David Richards

Queen chronology
At the Beeb (1989)	Innuendo (1991)	CD Single Box (1991)

Queen studio album chronology
The Miracle (1989)	Innuendo (1991)	Made in Heaven (1995)

Singles from Innuendo
- 1. "Innuendo" Released: 14 January 1991; 2. "Headlong" Released: 14 January 1991 (US); 3. "I'm Going Slightly Mad" Released: 4 March 1991; 4. "These Are the Days of Our Lives" Released: 5 September 1991 (US); 5. "The Show Must Go On" Released: 14 October 1991

Innuendo is the fourteenth studio album by the British rock band Queen, released on 4 February 1991 through Parlophone in the United Kingdom and Hollywood Records in the United States.

Produced by David Richards and Queen, it was recorded between March 1989 and November 1990. In the spring of 1987, Freddie Mercury had been diagnosed with AIDS, although he kept his illness a secret from the public and denied numerous media reports that he was seriously ill. The band and producers were aiming for a November or December release date in order to catch the crucial Christmas market, but Mercury's declining health meant that the release of the album did not take place until February 1991. Stylistically, Innuendo has been regarded as a return to Queen's mid-1970s period of bombastic rock and lavish production. The album cover was designed by Queen and Richard Gray. The booklets and single covers from the album are inspired by illustrations by 19th century French artist Jean-Jacques Grandville.

Innuendo was supported by the singles "Innuendo", "Headlong", "I'm Going Slightly Mad", "These Are the Days of Our Lives", and "The Show Must Go On". The album peaked at number one in seven countries, including the United Kingdom. Nine months after the album was released, on 24 November 1991, Mercury died of AIDS-derived bronchopneumonia, making Innuendo the final Queen album to be released during Mercury's lifetime. It was voted the 94th greatest album of all time in a national 2006 BBC poll.

== Background and recording ==
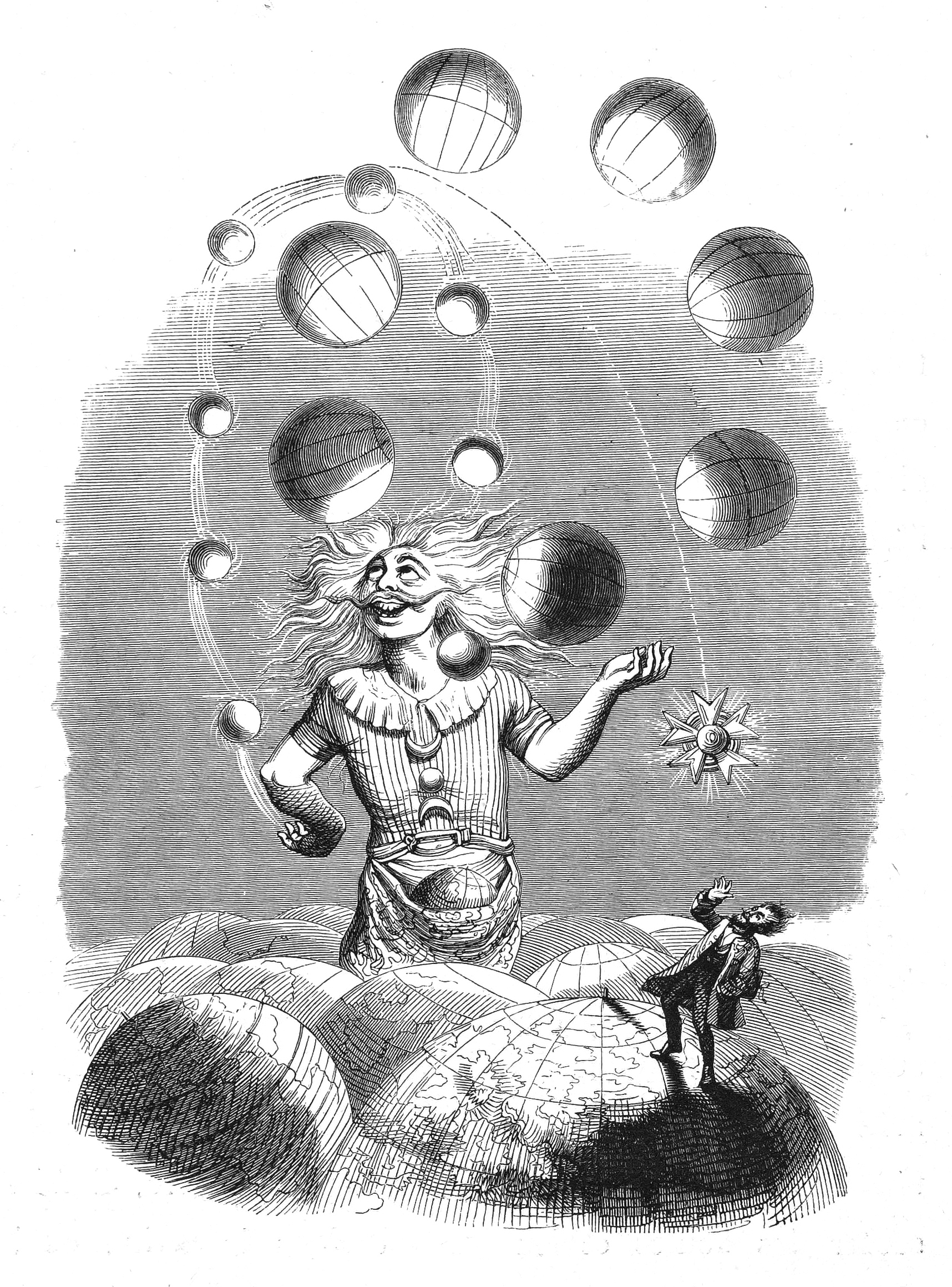
Wood engravings based on illustrations by Grandville, from his 1844 collection Un Autre Monde were colorized for use on the album's cover.

Queen released their thirteenth album, The Miracle, in May 1989, but unlike their previous albums, they did not conduct a live tour. In an interview Freddie Mercury conducted with BBC Radio 1, he said that he wanted to break from the "album – tour – album – tour" routine. He had privately been diagnosed as HIV-positive in 1987, and at the time of the interview had been diagnosed with AIDS, which was not yet publicised; however, rumours had been spreading since 1988 about his health and of the possibility that he had the disease, with speculation fuelled by a clear physical decline in his appearance, particularly weight loss. While he kept quiet due to his preference not to talk to the media, the other band members denied the rumours; at one point, band member Roger Taylor told reporters that "he is healthy and working". In February 1990, Queen won the Brit Award for Outstanding Contribution to British Music. While Mercury accepted the award for the band at the Dominion Theatre, Brian May spoke for the band. Mercury's increasingly gaunt appearance at the ceremony sparked further speculation from the public about his health, which persisted throughout 1990. The 1990 BRIT Awards would be Mercury's final public appearance.

Mercury did not speak publicly about his health, saying that he did not want to sell his music out of people's sympathy for him. He was determined to continue working on music with Queen for as long as he could, saying that he would "keep working until I fucking drop". Mercury was persistently bothered by reporters at his London home, making it difficult for the band to record. As a result, the band relocated to Mountain Studios in Montreux, where the safer and more peaceful atmosphere allowed the band to concentrate. Early in Innuendo's recording, the band decided that all work would be again credited to Queen as a whole instead of to individual contributing members; May said that the decision made a significant impact in the recording process, while Taylor said that it helped eliminate much of the egotistical struggles that would normally cause bands to break up.

The album was released in the US under a new label, the Disney-owned Hollywood Records, in an effort to garner greater exposure there. Hollywood had also secured the rights to Queen's Elektra and Capitol back catalogues, and began reissuing albums early in 1991, marking Queen's 20th anniversary.

== Songs ==
=== "Innuendo" ===
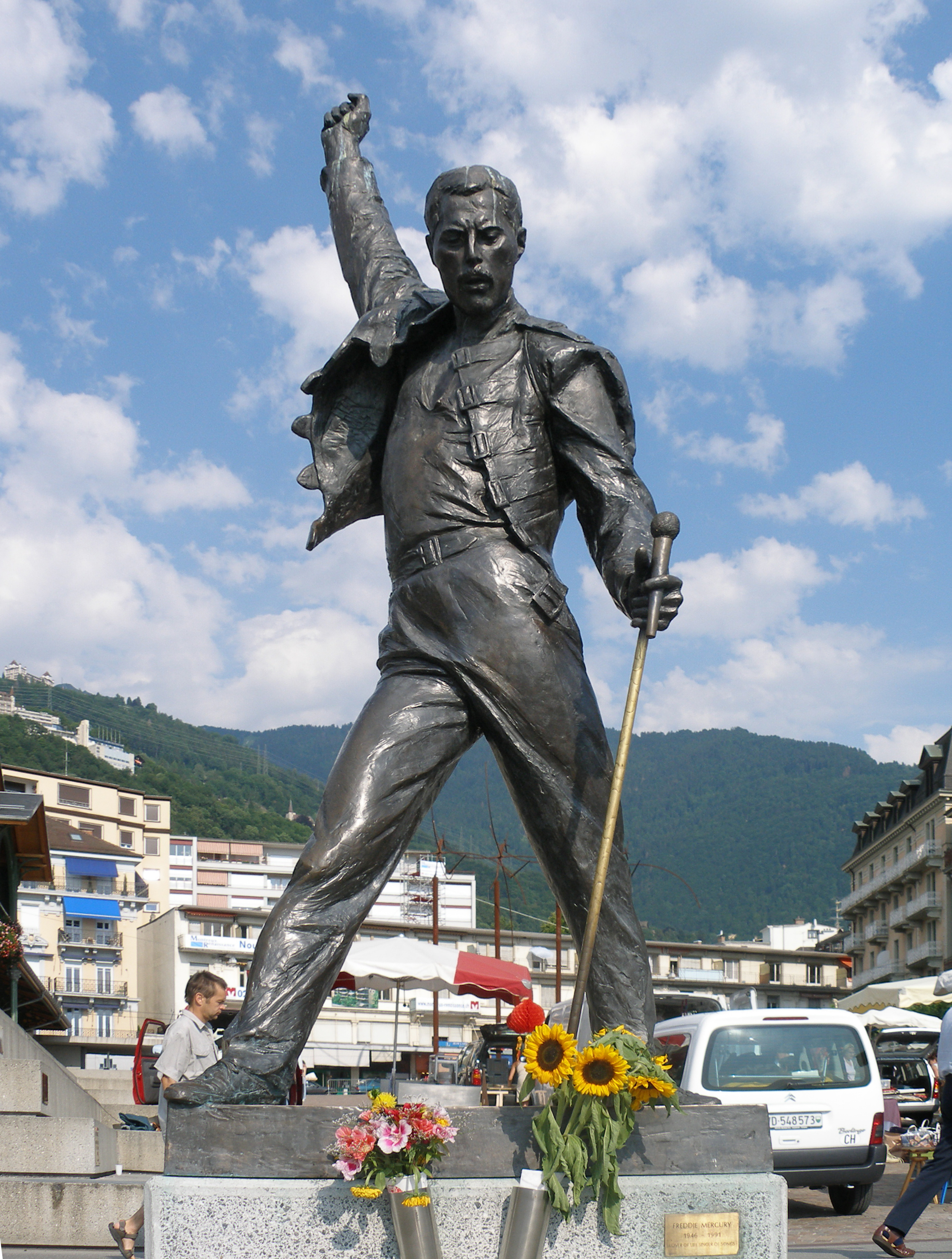
Innuendo was the last album that Freddie Mercury worked on before his death nine months after its release. Shown above: Mercury 1996 statue (by Irena Sedlecká) by Lake Geneva in Montreux, Switzerland.

"Innuendo" began as a jam session in Switzerland amongst Brian May, Roger Taylor and John Deacon in spring 1989. Freddie Mercury was upstairs and heard them playing the beat, and turned it into a song, creating the melody and starting off the lyrics. From then on all four worked on polishing the track and Taylor took over the lyrics (which were written as a tribute to Led Zeppelin and their song "Kashmir"). The middle section, written by Mercury, was included later and it features a synth-orchestra programmed by producer David Richards and a flamenco interlude played by Yes guitarist Steve Howe, who had come to visit them and was asked to play. "Innuendo" was released as a single in January 1991, debuting at No. 1 in the UK.

=== "I'm Going Slightly Mad" ===
"I'm Going Slightly Mad" was begun in Mercury's London house, after he had the idea of writing a song about madness, inspired by Noël Coward's camp one-liners. Most of the lyrics like "banana tree" or "one needle", came from both him and his friend Peter Straker, who stayed up all night in Mercury's kitchen, devising ever more outlandish lines. The music is Mercury's and is one of the earliest songs the band were working on in Montreux when Steve Howe came in. The video that accompanied the song saw Mercury dressed in a costume suit with wild hair, white gloves, long pointing shoes and extremely heavy make up, filmed in black and white. Whilst Queen fans were thoroughly amused by the band in the video, in the documentary, Champions of the World, Taylor confessed, from the band's perspective, the video was marred by Mercury's appearance having to be camouflaged by costume and make-up, as Taylor admitted Mercury looked "pretty ill, at that point."

=== "Headlong" ===
"Headlong" was written by May at the studio they had in Switzerland. He recorded it for his debut solo album, Back to the Light, which he was making at the same time, but after hearing Mercury sing it, decided it worked better as a Queen song.

=== "I Can't Live with You" ===
"I Can't Live with You" was also written for May's solo album. He gave it to the band as well since Taylor, Deacon and Mercury were fond of the track. Drums were programmed on synth by May, and the keyboard-pads were added by the producer. An alternative version of this song appeared on the 1997 compilation album Queen Rocks, billed as the "'97 Rocks Retake". It was said to be more along the lines of how May and Taylor originally wanted the track to sound, with a harder, guitar-driven rock edge. May has stated in an interview that most of the original demo is in the recording, making the song "impossible" to mix.

=== "Don't Try So Hard" ===
"Don't Try So Hard" came from Mercury. The intro "rain" is actually the pre-set sound of the Korg M1, which appears when it is switched on ("00: Universe").

=== "Ride the Wild Wind" ===
"Ride the Wild Wind" was composed by Taylor, who recorded a demo with his own vocals. The album version is sung by Mercury with Taylor on backing vocals. The song is a sort of sequel of Taylor's A Night at the Opera composition, "I'm in Love with My Car", which focused on a man's passion for cars and racing. This time, the song involved all of the other members, that gave life to a fast song with beating drums and rhythmic bass line, which create the sensation of speed and engine's roar. In the mid-part, a May solo, which accentuates the sense of high velocity, and also gives the song a heavier sound. In some parts, a racing car can be heard.

=== "All God's People" ===
"All God's People" was co-written by Mercury and Mike Moran, initially as part of Mercury's Barcelona project under the title "Africa by Night". He had asked May to play guitar, then one thing led to another and the entire band played. The keyboard parts were played by Moran. Similar to "Somebody to Love" from A Day at the Races, "All God's People" has a strong gospel influence. It contains Mercury's highest full-voice note, an F5 heard after the lyrics "around the world."

=== "These Are the Days of Our Lives" ===
"These Are the Days of Our Lives" was written by Taylor. Keyboards were programmed by all band members in the studio, and conga percussion was recorded by David Richards. The music video for this song was Mercury's last appearance in a video medium, and with his knowing farewell look straight at the camera, Mercury whispers "I still love you" at the end of the song. By the time the video was made, it had become impossible to disguise that Mercury was seriously ill. The video was filmed in colour, but converted to black and white to minimise Mercury's frail appearance. At a later date, colour footage of the band making the video was released, revealing just how ill Mercury was at the time.

=== "Delilah" ===
"Delilah" is a song Mercury penned for his favourite female calico cat named Delilah. Although Mercury had about 11 cats, Delilah was special. May recorded his solo using a talk box. Taylor later admitted he is not fond of the song, stating "I hate 'Delilah'. That's just not me."

=== "The Hitman" ===
The fly-away rocker "The Hitman" was started by Mercury. The original version was apparently on keyboards and in a different key. May took Mercury's riff (not uncommon), changed the key and recorded a demo of the heavy version. Deacon then re-arranged the structure and they all filled the gaps in lyrics and recorded it. All of the backing vocals were done by May. The demo version is sung by May, with Mercury making spoken comments (like "Bite the bullet baby!").

=== "Bijou" ===
"Bijou" was an idea Mercury and May had of making a song "inside-out", having guitar doing the verses and the vocal doing the break. Mercury put the chords, title and lyrics, and the two of them worked on the guitar parts. Mercury sang the first line and then May transferred the melody to his Red Special. The song was finished without any input from Taylor or Deacon. The inspiration for the song itself is twofold, Brian May; “The vocal is a succinct and very precise little verse, a little gem, a "Bijou" - a jewel buried at the heart of the piece: hence the name of the song.” “My Mum was given a budgie by a friend - it became a great companion for her after she lost my Dad. She called it "Bijou" and she would spend hours talking to it! ..It was her little Bijou.” In 2008, Queen + Paul Rodgers performed this song in their shows of the Rock the Cosmos Tour by May playing the verse live and then having Mercury's studio vocals play while a screen showed footage from the band's Wembley concert in 1986, with the visuals put in sync with the tape.

=== "The Show Must Go On" ===
"The Show Must Go On" was written by May, based on a chord sequence he had been working on. May decided to use the sequence, and both he and Mercury decided the theme of the lyrics and wrote the first verse together. From then on May finished the lyrics, completed the vocal melody and wrote the bridge, inspired by Pachelbel's Canon. Some keys and ideas were also suggested by the producer. The song chronicles the effort of Mercury continuing to perform despite approaching the end of his life. The song was initially not released as a single as part of promotion for the Innuendo album, but was released in October 1991 as the band launched their Greatest Hits II album. The video for the song features a compilation of clips from all their videos since 1982, in support of the Greatest Hits II album. Due to Mercury's critical health at the time of its production, a fresh appearance by the band in a video was not possible. The track is a personal favourite of fellow British artist Elton John, who performed the song at the Freddie Mercury Tribute Concert with the remaining members of Queen, and Tony Iommi playing rhythm guitar. A different live version featuring Elton John on vocals later appeared on Queen's Greatest Hits III album.

== Singles ==
"Innuendo" was the lead single from the album in most countries, except for the US where "Headlong" was released to radio as a promo prior to the album's release. The single was released on 14 January 1991 in Europe and in March 1991 in the US as a promo single, becoming Queen's third UK No. 1 single. The song also achieved modest success in the US, charting at No. 17 on Billboard's Mainstream Rock Tracks chart. Still, the length and style of the track limited its appeal, and it only spent one week at No. 1 in the UK and quickly slid down the chart, spending only six weeks in the top 75. (B-side on 7 inch release: "Bijou").

"I'm Going Slightly Mad" was released on 4 March 1991. The song reached No. 1 in Hong Kong and reached No. 22 on the UK charts. (B-side on 7 inch release: "The Hitman" in some countries, in others it was "Lost Opportunity", which was a non-album cut).

"Headlong" was released as a promotional single in January 1991 in the US and as a single on 13 May 1991 in the UK. It entered the UK charts at No. 14, and reached No. 3 on the US Billboard Mainstream Rock Tracks chart. (B-side on 12 inch release: "All God's People" in some countries, in others, "Lost Opportunity" and in a few, "The Hitman". The 12" and CD also feature "Mad the Swine").

"I Can't Live with You" was released as a promo single to radio stations in the US. This two-track promo single, completely remixed by Brian Malouf, uses slightly different lead vocal tracks by Mercury, louder and tighter harmony tracks, and reprogrammed synth drums, resulting in a much more punchy and "over the top" poppy version than included on the album. It reached No. 28 on the US Mainstream Rock Tracks chart.

"These Are the Days of Our Lives" was first released in the US on Mercury's birthday, 5 September 1991 on cassette and to radio. In the UK it was released in December 1991 following Mercury's death, as a double A-side with "Bohemian Rhapsody". The single was the UK's Christmas No. 1 of 1991.

"The Show Must Go On" was released on 14 October 1991 in the UK. The single was taken from the album but was released as promotion for the Greatest Hits II album (Classic Queen in the US/Canada), and peaked at No. 16 on the UK charts. After Mercury's death in November, the song re-entered the British charts and spent as many weeks in the top 75 as it had upon its original release. This single was released just six weeks before Mercury died. In 1992, the song was released as a double A-side with "Bohemian Rhapsody" in the US where it reached No. 2; the B-side for the original October 1991 release was "Keep Yourself Alive".

== Critical reception ==
Professional ratings
Review scores
Source	Rating
AllMusic	3/5 stars
The Cincinnati Post	3/5 stars
Entertainment Weekly	C−
MusicHound Rock	3/5 stars
NME	7/10
Rolling Stone	3/5 stars
Select	3/5 stars
Sounds	5/5 stars
St. Petersburg Times	4/5 stars

In 1991, Chuck Eddy of Rolling Stone wrote that Innuendo was "the group's most playful top-to-bottom pile since The Game" and "there's no getting around the new album's craft", which he suggested meant the band were "finally satisfied with their lot in life", but he added that "Innuendo is so lightweight you'll forget it as soon as it's over — which, with this band, should go without saying anyway". In 2016, for the same publication, Ron Hart described it as "Queen's last masterpiece" and an album which "boldly confronted mortality," likening it to David Bowie's final album Blackstar.

People wrote, "If this is cartoon rock and roll, at least it's good and brazenly cartoonish." The Orange County Register wrote, "Queen dispenses with any stylistic variations or flirtations with dance music and offers its basic sound: lots of Mercury vocal leaps, fuzzed-out May guitar, choral overdubs and a sense of orchestral importance mixed with straightforward hard rock", concluding that it was a "mixed bag". The LA Times wrote, "Given the bombast and harsh assault of Queen's biggest hits, it's a shock to find that the heart of... Innuendo, is made of soft, sweet, sticky, sentimental goo", but added "the goo actually goes down well" and "Queen hasn't forgotten how to rock."

In a retrospective review, AllMusic wrote, "Innuendo was a fitting way to end one of rock's most successful careers". For Classic Rock in 2016, Malcolm Dome ranked it as Queen's ninth greatest album, writing that "Innuendo had a lot of intelligent humour and pathos about it." He praised the title track's "brilliantly synthesised orchestrations" and added "perhaps most poignant of all is the low key yet mesmerising 'These Are The Days Of Our Lives', which ended with Mercury’s whispered paean 'I still love you', which was moving in its simplicity." Dome concluded, "The album summed up how Queen could draw people close, yet still keep them at a convenient distance."

== Track listing ==
All tracks credited to Queen, except "All God's People" credited to Queen and Mike Moran.

=== Original release ===
No.	Title	Writer(s)	Length
1.	"Innuendo"	Freddie Mercury; Roger Taylor	6:31
2.	"I'm Going Slightly Mad"	Mercury; Peter Straker	4:22
3.	"Headlong"	Brian May	4:38
4.	"I Can't Live with You"	May	4:33
5.	"Don't Try So Hard"	Mercury	3:39
6.	"Ride the Wild Wind"	Taylor	4:42
7.	"All God's People"	Mercury; Mike Moran	4:21
8.	"These Are the Days of Our Lives"	Taylor	4:15
9.	"Delilah"	Mercury	3:35
10.	"The Hitman"	Mercury; May; John Deacon	4:56
11.	"Bijou"	Mercury; May	3:36
12.	"The Show Must Go On"	May	4:35
Total length:			53:48

- Due to the total length of the album, five tracks had to be shortened in order to fit on the LP release. These tracks were "I'm Going Slightly Mad" (4:06), "These Are the Days of Our Lives" (3:55), "Don't Try So Hard" (3:33), "The Hitman" (3:43), and "Bijou" (1:19). The track listing for the LP release is also slightly different from the one for the CD release, with "Don't Try So Hard" moved to side 2, between "Delilah" and "The Hitman". Some of the shortened tracks can be found on the B-sides of concurrent 12" singles.

Disc 2: Bonus EP (2011 Universal Music CD reissue)
No.	Title	Writer(s)	Length
1.	"I Can't Live with You" (1997 Queen Rocks Version)	May	4:50
2.	"Lost Opportunity" (B-side to "I'm Going Slightly Mad")	May	3:53
3.	"Ride the Wild Wind" (Early version with guide vocal)	Taylor	4:14
4.	"I'm Going Slightly Mad" (Mad mix)	Mercury	4:37
5.	"Headlong" (Embryo with guide vocal)	May	4:44
Total length:			22:18

Bonus videos (2011 iTunes deluxe edition)
No.	Title	Length
6.	"Innuendo" (Alternative promo video)	6:31
7.	"These Are the Days of Our Lives" (Animated Hollywood Records promo video)	4:15
8.	"Mad in the Making: The Making of the 'I'm Going Slightly Mad' Promo Video" (Mini Documentary)	8:11
Total length:		41:15

=== 2015 LP ===
Innuendo was re-released on vinyl on 25 September 2015 by Virgin EMI Records and Hollywood Records, alongside all of Queen's other studio albums. This was the first time the album had been presented on vinyl in full, spread across 2 LPs. Just as the original LP had an altered track listing, the 2 LP version swapped the placement of "I Can't Live With You" and "These Are the Days of Our Lives" to have a similar amount of playing time on each side of vinyl.

Side one
No.	Title	Length
1.	"Innuendo"	6:32
2.	"I'm Going Slightly Mad" (Queen)	4:22
3.	"Headlong"	4:38
Total length:		15:32

Side two
No.	Title	Length
1.	"These Are the Days of Our Lives"	4:13
2.	"Don't Try So Hard"	3:39
3.	"Ride the Wild Wind"	4:42
Total length:		12:34

Side three
No.	Title	Length
1.	"All God's People" (Queen, Moran)	4:19
2.	"I Can't Live with You"	4:33
3.	"Delilah"	3:32
Total length:		12:24

Side four
No.	Title	Length
1.	"The Hitman"	4:56
2.	"Bijou"	3:37
3.	"The Show Must Go On"	4:31
Total length:		13:04

== Personnel ==
Queen

- Freddie Mercury – lead vocals, keyboards
- Brian May – guitars, keyboards, harmony vocals, lead vocals ("Lost Opportunity")
- Roger Taylor – drums, percussion, keyboards, harmony vocals
- John Deacon – bass guitar, keyboards

Additional personnel

- Steve Howe – Spanish guitar on "Innuendo"
- Mike Moran – keyboards on "All God's People"
- David Richards – producing, engineering, programming
- Noel Harris – assistant engineer
- Justin Shirley-Smith – assistant engineer
- Richard Gray – sleeve design
- Grandville (1803–47) – illustrations
- Angela Lumley – additional illustrations
- Simon Fowler – photography

== Charts ==
=== Weekly charts ===
Weekly chart performance for Innuendo
Chart (1991)	Peak position
Australian Albums (ARIA)	6
Austrian Albums (Ö3 Austria)	2
Belgian Albums (IFPI)	2
Canada Top Albums/CDs (RPM)	16
Danish Albums (Hitlisten)	4
Dutch Albums (Album Top 100)	1
Finnish Albums (The Official Finnish Charts)	1
French Albums (SNEP)	9
German Albums (Offizielle Top 100)	1
Hungarian Albums (MAHASZ)	3
Irish Albums (IRMA)	3
Italian Albums (Musica e Dischi)	1
Japanese Albums (Oricon)	17
New Zealand Albums (RMNZ)	6
Norwegian Albums (VG-lista)	8
Portuguese Albums (AFP)	1
Spanish Albums (PROMUSICAE)	3
Swedish Albums (Sverigetopplistan)	9
Swiss Albums (Schweizer Hitparade)	1
UK Albums (Official Charts)	1
US Billboard 200	30

2006 weekly chart performance for Innuendo
Chart (2006)	Peak position
Italian Albums (FIMI)	66

2011 weekly chart performance for Innuendo
Chart (2011)	Peak position
Belgian Albums (Ultratop Wallonia)	73

2021 weekly chart performance for Innuendo
Chart (2021)	Peak position
Polish Albums (ZPAV)	21

=== Year-end charts ===
Year-end chart performance for Innuendo
Chart (1991)	Position
Austrian Albums Chart	33
Canadian Albums Chart	60
Swiss Albums Chart	7
UK Albums Chart	31

== Certifications ==
Certifications for Innuendo
Region	Certification	Certified units/sales
Argentina (CAPIF)	Gold	30,000^{^}
Austria (IFPI Austria)	Platinum	50,000^{*}
Canada (Music Canada)	Gold	50,000^{^}
Finland (Musiikkituottajat)	Gold	38,221
France (SNEP)	Platinum	300,000^{*}
Germany (BVMI)	Platinum	500,000^{^}
Italy (FIMI) sales + streams since 2009	Platinum	50,000^{‡}
Mexico (AMPROFON)	Platinum	250,000
Netherlands (NVPI)	Platinum	100,000^{^}
Poland (ZPAV) 2009 Agora SA album reissue	Platinum	20,000^{*}
Spain (Promusicae)	Platinum	100,000^{^}
Switzerland (IFPI Switzerland)	2× Platinum	100,000^{^}
United Kingdom (BPI)	Platinum	300,000^{^}
United States (RIAA)	Gold	500,000^{^}
^{*} Sales figures based on certification alone.^{^} Shipments figures based on certification alone.^{‡} Sales+streaming figures based on certification alone.
