= Innuendo (song) =

1991 single by Queen

- Artwork for UK release

Single by Queen

from the album Innuendo
- B-side: "Bijou"; "Under Pressure" (CD and 12-inch)
- Released: 14 January 1991
- Recorded: Early 1989 – mid 1990
- Genre: Progressive rock
- Length: 6:30 (album version); 6:46 (12-inch explosive version)
- Label: Parlophone (Europe); Hollywood (North America)
- Songwriters: Queen (Freddie Mercury and Roger Taylor)
- Producers: Queen; David Richards

Queen singles chronology
"The Miracle" (1989)	"Innuendo" (1991)	"I'm Going Slightly Mad" (1991)

Music video
- "Innuendo" on YouTube

"Innuendo" is a song by the British rock band Queen. Written by Freddie Mercury and Roger Taylor but credited to Queen, it is the opening track on the album of the same name (1991), and was released in January 1991 by Parlophone as the first single from the album. The single debuted at number one on the UK Singles Chart same month, the band's first number-one hit since "Under Pressure" nearly a decade before, and additionally reached the top ten in ten other countries. It is included on the band's second compilation album Greatest Hits II.

At six-and-a-half minutes, it is one of Queen's epic songs. The song has been described as "reminiscent" of "Bohemian Rhapsody" because it was "harking back to their progressive rock roots". Its verses are in the Phrygian dominant mode and features a flamenco guitar section performed by Yes guitarist Steve Howe and Brian May, also in that mode, an operatic interlude and sections of hard rock that recall early Queen, in addition to the lyric inspired in part by Mercury's illness; although media stories about his health were being denied strenuously, he was by now seriously ill with AIDS, from which he would die in November 1991, 10 months after the song was released.

The song was accompanied by a music video featuring animated representations of the band on a cinema screen akin to Nineteen Eighty-Four, eerie plasticine figure stop-motion and harrowing imagery. It has been described as one of the band's darkest and most moving works. AllMusic described the song as a "superb epic" which deals with "mankind's inability to live harmoniously".

== Songwriting ==
"Innuendo" was pieced together "like a jigsaw puzzle". The recurring theme (with the Boléro-esque beat) started off as a jam session between May, Deacon and Taylor. Mercury then added the melody and some of the lyric, which were then completed by Taylor.

The middle section was primarily Mercury's work, according to an interview with May in October 1994's Guitar Magazine. It features a flamenco guitar solo, followed by a classically influenced bridge, and then the solo again but performed with electric guitars. This section is especially complex, featuring a pattern of three bars in 5/4 time (reasonably uncommon in popular music) followed by five bars in the more often used 3/4 time. The end of the flamenco-guitar style is based on the 5/4 bar, but is in 6/4 time.

The bridge section ("You can be anything you want to be") features sophisticated orchestration, created by Mercury and producer David Richards using the popular Korg M1 keyboard/synth/workstation. Mercury had arranged and co-arranged orchestras in his solo career, and closed the previous Queen album with the track "Was It All Worth It", which included a Gershwin-esque interlude also coming from an M1 synth. The Bridge section in "Innuendo" is in 3/4, showing once again Mercury's affection for triple metres: "Bicycle Race" is another one with main sections in 4/4 and middle-eight in 3/4, and some of his best-known pieces (namely "We Are the Champions" and "Somebody to Love") were in 6/8, as would be his last composition, "A Winter's Tale".

== Steve Howe's involvement ==
Steve Howe has said he was "so proud" to have played on the song and he became the only Queen non-member to have played guitar on a studio recording of a Queen song. Howe and Mercury had been friends for several years, since they ran into each other quite often at Townhouse Studios in London. Yes had recorded Going for the One at Mountain Studios in 1976–77 shortly before Queen bought the Swiss studio, and Asia's debut album was produced by Queen's engineer, Mike Stone.

On a break from a recording session in Geneva, Howe drove to Montreux and stopped to have lunch. There he ran into Martin Groves, who had worked for Yes before and by this time was Queen's equipment supervisor. Groves told him Queen were in the studio at the moment.

As soon as Steve Howe went into the studios, Mercury asked him to play some guitar (according to producer David Richards, who had worked with Yes in the past as well). Another version is that Brian May was the one who asked him to play the flamenco bit. When the members of Queen asked if Howe wanted to play on the title track, Howe politely suggested they’d lost their minds. It took the combined weight of Mercury, May and Taylor to persuade him.

According to Steve Howe:

Inside, there’s Freddie, Brian and Roger all sitting together. They go: ‘Let’s play you the album’. Of course, I’m hearing it for the first time […] And they saved "Innuendo" itself until last. They played it and I was fucking blown away. They all chimed in: ‘We want some crazy Spanish guitar flying around over the top. Improvise!’ I started noodling around on the guitar, and it was pretty tough. After a couple of hours, I thought: ‘I’ve bitten off more than I can chew here’. I had to learn a bit of the structure, work out what the chordal roots were, where you had to fall if you did a mad run in the distance; you have to know where you’re going. But it got towards evening, and we’d doodled and I’d noodled, and it turned out to be really good fun. We have this beautiful dinner, we go back to the studio and have a listen. And they go: ‘That’s great. That’s what we wanted’.

The album's liner notes contain the credit "on "Innuendo": Additional Wandering Minstrel Spanish Guitar - Somewhere In The Middle - by Steve Howe. Many thanks Steve".

== Music video ==
A very elaborate music video was created to accompany the single and released on 20 December 1990, combining stop motion animation with rotoscoping and featuring dolls in a detailed miniature cinema set. The band members only appear as illustrations and images, mainly taken from earlier Queen music videos (such as "The Miracle", "Scandal", "Breakthru", "The Invisible Man", "I Want It All", and clips from the then unreleased "Live at Wembley '86"), on a cinema screen in the same manner as in the film Nineteen Eighty-Four, with Mercury drawn in the style of Leonardo da Vinci, May in the style of Victorian etchings, Taylor in the style of Jackson Pollock, and Deacon in the style of Pablo Picasso. It also featured a montage of historical stock footages, including from both WWII and the Gulf War. The interlude of Flamenco music showed claymation figures of jesters performing, which were animated by Klaybow Films. The video received heavy rotation on MTV Europe and won production company DoRo (who also produced the videos to all other singles from the Innuendo album) a Monitor Award for Best Achievement in Music Video.

== Critical reception ==
Upon its release as a single, Ian Gittins, writing for Melody Maker, considered "Innuendo" to be "Bohemian Rhapsody" Vol II and described it as "seductively monstrous". He added, "All ill-starred vocal operatics, hairy-palmed guitar runs and portentous drivel, it even breaks into Spanish rhumba at one sublime point." David Quantick of NME called it a "spectacularly tossy rock anthem" and Music Week writer Alan Jones praised it as "utterly distinctive, typically over the top and undoubtedly a major hit". Caroline Sullivan of Smash Hits considered it to be a "well-odd combination of soft ballad, blustering heavy metal and sweeping, Moroccan-type music", with Mercury "wailing in his usual hysterical fashion". She concluded that the "whole thing is completely over the top" and "totally brilliant", "even if it is more than slightly influenced by 'Bohemian Rhapsody'".

Ralph Traitor of Sounds noted that it is "curious for its resemblance to an imaginary Zep outtake", but felt there were no surprises "apart from a prolonged outbreak of flamenco guitar". Robin Smith, writing for Record Mirror, was critical in his review, calling it a "bizarre mixture of the worst excesses of Iron Maiden and the sound of a tin bath hitting the pavement after being thrown from the top of the Empire State". He concluded, "Definitely a case of cholestrol blocking up their creative arteries." Phil Wilding of Kerrang! was also negative, writing, "Sounding unsettingly like vintage Diamond Head from the off, this six and a half minute single, replete with three or four differing musical sections including hand claps, flamenco guitar and nothing approaching a serious hook, is not so much commercial suicide as ponderous fortysomethings showing off. Disastrous."

In the US, Larry Flick of Billboard magazine stated that the "dramatic" track is "one of those rare songs that actually take the listener on an imaginative journey". He found it has "a lot going on, starting with the opening, with its revolutionary drum rolls and dark, eerie vocals, and then a surprising transition, complete with Spanish".

== Track listings ==
- 7-inch single

A. "Innuendo" (album version) – 6:30
B. "Bijou" – 3:37

- 12-inch and CD single
1. "Innuendo" (explosive version) – 6:46
2. "Under Pressure" – 4:04
3. "Bijou" – 3:37

== Personnel ==
Queen

- Freddie Mercury – lead and backing vocals, keyboards
- Brian May – electric guitar, classical guitar
- Roger Taylor – drums, percussion
- John Deacon – bass guitar

Additional musicians

- Steve Howe – classical guitar and Spanish guitar solos
- David Richards – keyboard programming

== Charts ==
=== Weekly charts ===
Chart (1991)	Peak position
Australia (ARIA)	28
Austria (Ö3 Austria Top 40)	12
Belgium (Ultratop 50 Flanders)	8
Europe (Eurochart Hot 100)	3
Europe (European Hit Radio)	13
Finland (Suomen virallinen lista)	3
Germany (GfK)	5
Ireland (IRMA)	4
Italy (Musica e dischi)	3
Luxembourg (Radio Luxembourg)	1
Netherlands (Dutch Top 40)	4
Netherlands (Single Top 100)	4
New Zealand (Recorded Music NZ)	10
Portugal (AFP)	1
Spain (AFYVE)	6
Switzerland (Schweizer Hitparade)	3
UK Singles (Official Charts)	1
UK Airplay (Music Week)	14
US Mainstream Rock (Billboard)	17

=== Year-end charts ===
Chart (1991)	Position
Belgium (Ultratop)	86
Europe (Eurochart Hot 100)	39
Germany (Media Control)	60
Netherlands (Dutch Top 40)	42
Netherlands (Single Top 100)	33
UK Singles (OCC)	70

== Certifications ==
Region	Certification	Certified units/sales
Italy (FIMI)	Gold	35,000^{‡}
United Kingdom (BPI)	Silver	200,000^{^}
^{^} Shipments figures based on certification alone.^{‡} Sales+streaming figures based on certification alone.

== Release history ==
Region	Date	Format(s)	Label(s)	Ref.
United Kingdom	14 January 1991	7-inch vinyl; 12-inch vinyl; cassette	Parlophone	
United Kingdom	21 January 1991	CD	Parlophone	
Australia	21 January 1991	7-inch vinyl; cassette	Parlophone	
Australia	28 January 1991	12-inch vinyl (white version)	Parlophone	
Japan	30 January 1991	CD	EMI	
Australia	11 February 1991	12-inch vinyl	Parlophone	

== Other versions ==
The song and parts of the Led Zeppelin songs "Kashmir" and "Thank You" were performed by that band's lead singer Robert Plant with the three surviving members of Queen (May, Taylor and Deacon) at The Freddie Mercury Tribute Concert in 1992 at Wembley Stadium. "Kashmir" had been one of the inspirations for "Innuendo". However, the song was left off the DVD release at Plant's request, as he forgot part of the lyrics and his vocal was, by his own admission, not in the best shape. As in "Kashmir", the title of the song appears in the lyrics only once.

The 12-inch "explosive version" of "Innuendo" features a noise similar to an atomic bomb after Mercury sings the line "until the end of time".

There was a "promo version" released of the song, accompanied by an edited video. This version clocks in at only 3 minutes and 28 seconds.

Chris Daughtry covered this song on the Queen themed week on American Idol's fifth season.

Hard rock band Queensrÿche has covered this song in their Take Cover album.

Power metal band Lords of Black recorded a cover of the song in their second studio album II (2016). It appears as a bonus for the digital edition.

== In popular culture ==
- The song is included in the competitive karaoke videogame SingStar Queen for PlayStation 2 and PlayStation 3.
- The song is used as an introduction videomix for We Will Rock You.
- The song was used during an episode of The Death of Yugoslavia.
