= I'm Going Slightly Mad =

- Artwork for UK release

Single by Queen

from the album Innuendo
- B-side: "The Hitman"; "Lost Opportunity"
- Released: 4 March 1991
- Recorded: 1990
- Genre: Synth-pop
- Length: 4:22 (CD version); 4:09 (LP edit)
- Label: Parlophone
- Songwriters: Queen (Freddie Mercury and Peter Straker)
- Producers: Queen; David Richards

Queen singles chronology
| "Innuendo" (1991) | "I'm Going Slightly Mad" (1991) | "Headlong" (1991) |

Music video
- "I'm Going Slightly Mad" on YouTube

"I'm Going Slightly Mad" is a song by the British rock band Queen. Written by Freddie Mercury but credited to Queen, with uncredited lyrical contributions by Peter Straker, it was released as the second single from the band's fourteenth album, Innuendo (1991). The song was released as a single on 4 March 1991 by Parlophone, a month after the release of the album. The lyrics and the accompanying music video project the song as humorous and lighthearted, despite the lyrics dealing with the mental decline Mercury was experiencing as one of the effects of advancing AIDS.

The single cover was inspired by a Grandville illustration (as are the others from the album).

== Background ==
"I'm Going Slightly Mad" had been mentioned by John Deacon in a letter printed in the Queen Fan Club magazine of Spring 1990. Deacon revealed that work was being done on the song, calling it the "whacky single". Mercury composed the song; he had the song's title in mind before anything else. During an evening with his friend Peter Straker, Mercury explained his idea for the song, which he wanted to feature lyrics of tongue-in-cheek one-liners inspired by Noël Coward. The pair then spent the night coming up with such lines.

In his 1994 book Mercury and Me, Mercury's partner Jim Hutton recalled:

Freddie set about with Peter trying to come up with a succession of goofy lyrics, each funnier than the last. He screamed when they came up with things like "I'm knitting with only one needle" and "I'm driving on only three wheels these days". But the master-stroke was: "I think I'm a banana tree". Once that came out there was no stopping Freddie and Straker – they were then in full flow. I went to bed to fall asleep listening to their laughter wafting upstairs.

During 1991, Mercury recorded a short, "Totally Bonkers" version of the song as a message for Queen's 1991 fan club convention. The version, less than a minute in length, features different instrumentation, lyrics and vocal than that used in the main, full Queen recording of the song.

== Critical reception ==
Upon its release as a single, Sylvia Patterson of Smash Hits described "I'm Going Slightly Mad" as "blustering Queen pomp rock as usual". Chris Roberts of Melody Maker remarked, "I am prepared to go along with the perennial seer and prophet Fred Mercury. This is the very song where he makes the now-infamous claim that he is "a banana tree". So it's Fyffes stars for this one!" Robin Smith of Record Mirror was negative in his review, calling it "more crud from Queen" and "another incomprehensible single with Freddie sounding strangely like Billy Mackenzie – a terrifying thought indeed".

== Music video ==
The accompanying video was directed by Rudi Dolezal and Hannes Rossacher of DoRo Productions. Like most of other Innuendo videos, it was filmed in February 1991 at Limehouse Studios. Costumes were created by Diana Moseley. It features the band dressed and acting in an absurd and surreal manner, including guitarist Brian May dressed as a penguin (a reprise of his outfit featured in the booklet of the first Queen album), drummer Roger Taylor wearing a tea kettle on his head and riding a tricycle while Mercury sneaks up on him and is chasing him, a man in a gorilla suit, bassist John Deacon as a jester, and Mercury wearing a bunch of bananas as a wig, which corresponds with the line "I think I'm a banana tree".

"I'm Going Slightly Mad" is the last Queen video to feature significant creative input from Mercury. He was already considerably ill at the time due to AIDS, which would claim his life less than a year later. Despite this, the viewer sees Mercury as very mobile and expressive in the scenes of the video. He even actively co-directed some of the video's storyboards. Mercury wore thick makeup to cover up the blotches on his face, and an extra layer of clothing underneath to conceal his weight loss. He also wore a wig, and a suit, both in the goth-inspired style popular at the time.

In contrast, in the video for "These Are the Days of Our Lives", the last music video which Mercury ever filmed (in May 1991), he hardly moved around at all, as his condition had deteriorated further. However, both of these videos were shot in black and white.

== Track listings ==
7-inch single

A. "I'm Going Slightly Mad" – 4:22
B. "The Hitman" – 4:56

12-inch and CD single

1. "I'm Going Slightly Mad" – 4:22
2. "The Hitman" – 4:56
3. "Lost Opportunity" – 3:51

== Personnel ==
- Freddie Mercury – lead and backing vocals, Korg M1 synthesizer, piano, sampler
- Brian May – guitars, backing vocals
- Roger Taylor – drums, maracas, bar chimes, drum machine
- John Deacon – bass guitar

== Charts ==
| Chart (1991) | Peak position |
|---|---|
| Belgium (Ultratop 50 Flanders) | 39 |
| Europe (Eurochart Hot 100) | 51 |
| Germany (GfK) | 42 |
| Ireland (IRMA) | 19 |
| Luxembourg (Radio Luxembourg) | 18 |
| Netherlands (Dutch Top 40) | 13 |
| Netherlands (Single Top 100) | 20 |
| UK Singles (Official Charts) | 22 |
| UK Airplay (Music Week) | 10 |

== Release history ==
| Region | Date | Format(s) | Label(s) | Ref. |
|---|---|---|---|---|
| United Kingdom | 4 March 1991 | 7-inch vinyl; 12-inch vinyl; CD; cassette | Parlophone | |
| Australia | 20 May 1991 | 7-inch vinyl; 12-inch vinyl; CD; cassette | Parlophone | |
