= David Richards (music producer) =

English record producer, engineer and musician

- Born: 28 February 1956
- Origin: England
- Died: 20 December 2013 (aged 57)
- Occupations: Record producer; engineer
- Instrument: Keyboards
- Years active: 1973–2013
- Spouse(s): Collette McCready; Vivian Wang
- Partner: Nathalie Manser

David Richards (28 February 1956 – 20 December 2013) was an English record producer, engineer and musician. He was based in Switzerland in the Mountain Studios in Montreux, owned by the rock band Queen, and in Attalens, where he engineered and co-produced many albums by Queen, David Bowie and other artists. Richards also played keyboards on some records and dealt with live music recording in such events as Montreux Jazz Festival.

Richards died on 20 December 2013 after a long battle with an undisclosed illness.

== Selected discography ==
Albums co-produced by David Richards:

- Roger Taylor - Fun in Space (1981)
- Roger Taylor - Strange Frontier (1984)
- Chris Rea – Shamrock Diaries (1985)
- Jimmy Nail - Take It or Leave It (1985; single: "Love Don't Live Here Anymore")
- Feargal Sharkey – Feargal Sharkey (1985; single: "Loving You")
- Chris Rea – On the Beach (1986)
- Queen – A Kind of Magic (1986)
- Iggy Pop – Blah-Blah-Blah (1986)
- Magnum – Vigilante (1986)
- Virginia Wolf – Virginia Wolf (1986)
- David Bowie – Never Let Me Down (1987)
- The Cross – Shove It (1988)
- Freddie Mercury and Montserrat Caballé – Barcelona (1988)
- Queen – The Miracle (1989)
- Queen – Innuendo (1991)
- David Bowie – The Buddha of Suburbia (1993)
- David Bowie – Outside (1995)
- Queen – Made in Heaven (1995)
- William Fierro - UNO (2013; Enregisterment, mixing and mastering, arrangements)

Others:

- Yes – Going for the One (1977; assistant engineer)
- Queen – Live Killers (1979; assistant engineer)
- Roger Taylor – Fun in Space (1981)
- Queen – Live Magic (1986; recorded by Mack and Richards)
- Brian May – Back to the Light (1992; engineer, recording, mixing: "Driven by You", "Last Horizon", "Just One Life")
- Duran Duran - Duran Duran (1993; mixing)
- Duran Duran - Thank You (1995; mixing: "Perfect Day")
- Brian May – Another World (1998; additional recording: "Why Don't We Try Again"; mixing: "Another World")
- Samael – Eternal (1999; recording, mixing)
- David Bowie - Welcome to the Blackout (Live London ’78) (Mixed in 1979, released in 2018)
- Bluvertigo - Zero (Mixed and released in 1999)
