= The Rhapsody Tour =

2019–24 concert tour by Queen and Adam Lambert

- World tour by Queen + Adam Lambert
- Poster with the European cities
- Location: Asia; Europe; North America; Oceania
- Start date: 10 July 2019
- End date: 14 February 2024
- Legs: 6
- No. of shows: 109

Queen + Adam Lambert concert chronology
- Queen + Adam Lambert Tour 2017–2018 (2017–2018); The Rhapsody Tour (2019–2024)

The Rhapsody Tour was a concert tour by Queen + Adam Lambert, the collaboration between British rock band Queen and American singer Adam Lambert. The tour was announced following the success of the biopic film Bohemian Rhapsody. The tour marked the group's third visits to North America and Oceania after performing there in 2014 as part of the Queen + Adam Lambert Tour 2014–2015 and in 2017 and 2018 as part of the Queen + Adam Lambert Tour 2017–2018. The North American dates of the tour sold out in April 2019. The North American leg began on 10 July 2019, in Vancouver, Canada at the Rogers Arena and continued throughout the continent until its last show in Charlotte. The tour went through Europe, Oceania and a second North American leg which ended in Los Angeles before concluding in Tokyo Dome on 14 February 2024.

== Background ==
After performing with American Idol finalists Kris Allen and Adam Lambert during the programme's season finale in 2009, the active members of Queen, Brian May and Roger Taylor, began contemplating the future of the band after the group's amicable split with touring collaborator Paul Rodgers. Two years later, at the 2011 MTV Europe Music Awards, Queen was presented that year's Global Icon Award, accepted by May. As part of the broadcast, Queen performed a short set with Lambert, receiving an overwhelmingly welcoming response. Speculation regarding a collaboration with Lambert soon arose, with the three formally announcing a short summer tour of Europe in 2012, including three dates at the Hammersmith Apollo in London, as well as shows in Ukraine, Russia and Poland. As with the partnership with Paul Rodgers, John Deacon chose not to participate.

== Setlists ==
Leg 1 — North America
1. "Innuendo" (video intro)
2. "Now I'm Here"
3. "Seven Seas of Rhye"
4. "Keep Yourself Alive"
5. "Hammer to Fall"
6. "Killer Queen"
7. "Don't Stop Me Now"
8. "In the Lap of the Gods... Revisited" (not played on 31 July and 3 August; swapped positions with "Somebody to Love" from 9 to 23 August)
9. "Somebody to Love" (swapped positions with "In the Lap of the Gods... Revisited" from 9 to 23 August)
10. "I'm in Love with My Car"
11. "Bicycle Race" (not played on 4 August)
12. "Another One Bites the Dust" (swapped positions with "Fat Bottomed Girls" from 10 July to 20 July)
13. "One Vision" (played once on 10 July)
14. "Machines (or Back to Humans)" (played to 13 August but was also dropped 9 and 10 August)
15. "I Want It All" (swapped positions with "Radio Ga Ga" from 10 July to 14 July)
16. "Love of My Life"
17. "'39"
18. "Doing All Right"
19. "Crazy Little Thing Called Love"
20. "Under Pressure"
21. "Dragon Attack" (dropped from 23 July to 13 August; played after "Tie Your Mother Down" from 10 July to 20 July)
22. "I Want to Break Free"
23. "Who Wants to Live Forever" (with "You Take My Breath Away" intro on tape)
24. "Guitar Solo" (including Largo from Dvorak's New World Symphony No. 9)
25. "Tie Your Mother Down"
26. "The Show Must Go On" (played before "I'm in Love With My Car" from 10 July to 7 August and was played in the encore before "We Will Rock You" on 9 August)
27. "Fat Bottomed Girls" (swapped positions with "Another One Bites the Dust" from 10 July to 20 July)
28. "Radio Ga Ga" (swapped positions with "I Want It All" from 10 July to 14 July)
29. "Bohemian Rhapsody"
  Encore
30. "Day-Oh" (Freddie singing at Queen at Wembley)
31. "We Will Rock You"
32. "We Are the Champions"
33. "God Save the Queen" (tape)
Leg 2 — Asia
1. "Innuendo" (video intro)
2. "Now I'm Here"
3. "Seven Seas of Rhye"
4. "Keep Yourself Alive"
5. "Hammer to Fall"
6. "Killer Queen"
7. "Don't Stop Me Now"
8. "Somebody to Love"
9. "In the Lap of the Gods... Revisited"
10. "I'm in Love with My Car"
11. "Bicycle Race"
12. "Another One Bites the Dust"
13. "I Want It All"
14. "Teo Torriatte (Let Us Cling Together)" (Japanese shows only)
15. "Love of My Life"
16. "'39"
17. "Doing All Right"
18. "Crazy Little Thing Called Love"
19. "Under Pressure"
20. "Dragon Attack"
21. "I Was Born to Love You" (Japanese shows only; played before "Radio Ga Ga" on 25 January)
22. "I Want to Break Free"
23. "Who Wants to Live Forever" (with "You Take My Breath Away" intro on tape)
24. "Guitar Solo" (including Largo from Dvorak's New World Symphony No. 9)
25. "Tie Your Mother Down"
26. "The Show Must Go On"
27. "Fat Bottomed Girls" (Korean shows only)
28. "Radio Ga Ga"
29. "Bohemian Rhapsody"
  Encore
30. "Day-Oh" (Freddie singing at Queen at Wembley)
31. "We Will Rock You"
32. "We Are the Champions"
33. "God Save the Queen" (tape)
Leg 3 — Oceania
1. "Innuendo" (video intro)
2. "Now I'm Here"
3. "Seven Seas of Rhye"
4. "Keep Yourself Alive"
5. "Hammer to Fall"
6. "Somebody to Love" (played after "Don't Stop Me Now" on 5 and 7 February, and played before "I Want to Break Free" on 10 and 13 February)
7. "Killer Queen"
8. "Don't Stop Me Now"
9. "In the Lap of the Gods... Revisited"
10. "I'm in Love with My Car" (not played on 20 February)
11. "Bicycle Race"
12. "Fat Bottomed Girls"
13. "Another One Bites the Dust"
14. "I Want It All"
15. "Love of My Life"
16. "'39"
17. "Doing All Right" (not played on 20 February)
18. "Crazy Little Thing Called Love"
19. "Under Pressure"
20. "Dragon Attack"
21. "I Was Born to Love You" (played on 5 and 7 February)
22. "Whole Lotta Love" (played from 10 February onwards)
23. "Heartbreak Hotel" (played from 13 February onwards)
24. "I Want to Break Free"
25. "Who Wants to Live Forever" (with "You Take My Breath Away" intro on tape)
26. "Guitar Solo" (including Largo from Dvorak's New World Symphony No. 9)
27. "Tie Your Mother Down"
28. "The Show Must Go On"
29. "Radio Ga Ga"
30. "Bohemian Rhapsody"
  Encore
31. "Day-Oh" (Freddie singing at Queen at Wembley)
32. "We Will Rock You"
33. "We Are the Champions"
34. "God Save the Queen" (tape)
Leg 4 — Europe
1. "Innuendo" (video intro)
2. "Now I'm Here"
3. "Tear It Up" (not played after 7 July)
4. "Seven Seas of Rhye" (not played after 7 July)
5. "Keep Yourself Alive" (played once on 27 May)
6. "Hammer to Fall"
7. "Somebody to Love"
8. "Killer Queen"
9. "Don't Stop Me Now"
10. "Nessun dorma" (played on 10 and 11 July)
11. "In the Lap of the Gods... Revisited"
12. "I'm in Love with My Car" (not played after 20 June but returned 6 July onwards)
13. "Bicycle Race"
14. "Fat Bottomed Girls"
15. "Another One Bites the Dust"
16. "I Want It All"
17. "Maybe It's Because I'm a Londoner" (played on 17, 18 and 20 June)
18. "Love of My Life"
19. "'39"
20. "These Are the Days of Our Lives" (not played on 21, 24 and 26 June)
21. "Crazy Little Thing Called Love"
22. "Under Pressure" (not played on 21 June)
23. "A Kind of Magic"
24. "I Want to Break Free"
25. "Who Wants to Live Forever" (with "You Take My Breath Away" intro on tape)
26. "Guitar Solo" (including Largo from Dvorak's New World Symphony No. 9)
27. "Tie Your Mother Down"
28. "The Show Must Go On" (not played on 14, 15, 21 and 26 June, 15 July and from 18 July onwards)
29. "Radio Ga Ga"
30. "Bohemian Rhapsody"
  Encore
31. "Day-Oh" (Freddie singing at Queen at Wembley)
32. "We Will Rock You"
33. "We Are the Champions"
34. "God Save the Queen" (tape)
Leg 5 — North America
1. "Machines (Or 'Back to Humans')"/"Radio Ga Ga"
2. "Hammer to Fall"
3. "Stone Cold Crazy" (not played after 18 October)
4. "Another One Bites the Dust"
5. "I'm in Love with My Car"
6. "Bicycle Race" (not played on 21 October)
7. "Fat Bottomed Girls"
8. "I Want It All"
9. "A Kind of Magic"
10. "Killer Queen" (not played on 21 October)
11. "Don't Stop Me Now"
12. "Somebody to Love"
13. "Love of My Life"
14. "'39" (not played on 21 October)
15. "Drum Solo" (not played on 21, 28 and 30 October)
16. "Under Pressure"
17. "Tie Your Mother Down" (not played on 31 October)
18. "Crazy Little Thing Called Love"
19. "I Want to Break Free"
20. "Who Wants to Live Forever" (with "You Take My Breath Away" intro on tape)
21. "Guitar Solo" (not played on 21 October)
22. "Is This the World We Created...?" (not played on 21 October)
23. "The Show Must Go On" (not played on 12, 13 and 15 October)
24. "Bohemian Rhapsody"
  Encore
25. "Day-Oh" (Freddie singing at Queen at Wembley)
26. "We Will Rock You"
27. "Radio Ga Ga" (Reprise)
28. "We Are the Champions"
29. "God Save the Queen" (tape)
Leg 6 — Asia
1. "Machines (Or 'Back to Humans')"/"Radio Ga Ga"
2. "Hammer to Fall"
3. "Fat Bottomed Girls" (played after "Bicycle Race" on 4 February)
4. "Another One Bites the Dust"
5. "I'm in Love with My Car"
6. "Bicycle Race"
7. "I Was Born to Love You" (played after "Crazy Little Thing Called Love" on 4 February)
8. "I Want It All"
9. "Love of My Life"
10. "Teo Torriatte (Let Us Cling Together)"
11. "Drum Solo"
12. "Under Pressure"
13. "Tie Your Mother Down"
14. "Crazy Little Thing Called Love"
15. "Who Wants to Live Forever" (with "You Take My Breath Away" intro on tape)
16. "Guitar Solo"
17. "Is This the World We Created...?"
18. "A Kind of Magic"
19. "Killer Queen" (played once on 4 February)
20. "Don't Stop Me Now"
21. "Somebody to Love"
22. "The Show Must Go On"
23. "Bohemian Rhapsody"
  Encore
24. "Day-Oh" (Freddie singing at Queen at Wembley)
25. "We Will Rock You"
26. "Radio Ga Ga" (Reprise)
27. "We Are the Champions"
28. "God Save the Queen" (tape)

== Tour dates ==
List of concerts in North America
Date	City	Country	Venue	Attendance	Revenue
10 July 2019	Vancouver	Canada	Rogers Arena	14,392 / 14,392	$1,701,360
12 July 2019	Tacoma	United States	Tacoma Dome	19,147 / 19,147	$1,939,777
14 July 2019	San Jose	United States	SAP Center	13,418 / 13,418	$1,788,296
16 July 2019	Phoenix	United States	Talking Stick Resort Arena	13,574 / 13,574	$1,604,064
17 July 2019 (Note: Private concert specifically for the attendees of the Microsoft Inspire conference.)	Las Vegas	United States	Las Vegas Festival Grounds	—	—
19 July 2019	Inglewood	United States	The Forum	29,373 / 29,373	$4,301,412
20 July 2019	Inglewood	United States	The Forum	29,373 / 29,373	$4,301,412
23 July 2019	Dallas	United States	American Airlines Center	14,419 / 14,419	$1,879,599
24 July 2019	Houston	United States	Toyota Center	12,653 / 12,653	$1,627,417
27 July 2019	Detroit	United States	Little Caesars Arena	16,754 / 16,754	$1,781,325
28 July 2019	Toronto	Canada	Scotiabank Arena	15,728 / 15,728	$1,920,782
30 July 2019	Washington, D.C.	United States	Capital One Arena	14,896 / 14,896	$1,919,710
31 July 2019	Pittsburgh	United States	PPG Paints Arena	14,152 / 14,152	$1,672,100
3 August 2019	Philadelphia	United States	Wells Fargo Center	15,422 / 15,422	$1,949,987
4 August 2019	Mansfield	United States	Xfinity Center	19,821 / 19,821	$1,537,028
6 August 2019	New York City	United States	Madison Square Garden	29,622 / 29,622	$4,148,957
7 August 2019	New York City	United States	Madison Square Garden	29,622 / 29,622	$4,148,957
9 August 2019	Chicago	United States	United Center	16,108 / 16,108	$2,089,002
10 August 2019	Saint Paul	United States	Xcel Energy Center	15,578 / 15,578	$1,956,969
13 August 2019	Columbus	United States	Nationwide Arena	14,294 / 14,294	$1,566,927
15 August 2019	Nashville	United States	Bridgestone Arena	14,169 / 14,169	$1,626,022
17 August 2019	Sunrise	United States	BB&T Center	14,325 / 14,325	$1,782,692
18 August 2019	Tampa	United States	Amalie Arena	14,558 / 14,558	$1,697,316
20 August 2019	New Orleans	United States	Smoothie King Center	13,741 / 13,741	$1,706,957
22 August 2019	Atlanta	United States	State Farm Arena	11,721 / 11,721	$1,502,796
23 August 2019	Charlotte	United States	Spectrum Center	14,597 / 14,597	$1,768,254
28 September 2019 (Note: Part of the Global Citizen Festival.)	New York City	United States	Central Park	—	—

List of concerts in Asia
Date	City	Country	Venue	Attendance	Revenue
18 January 2020	Seoul	South Korea	Gocheok Sky Dome	—	—
19 January 2020	Seoul	South Korea	Gocheok Sky Dome	—	—
25 January 2020	Saitama	Japan	Saitama Super Arena	—	—
26 January 2020	Saitama	Japan	Saitama Super Arena	—	—
28 January 2020	Osaka	Japan	Kyocera Dome	—	—
30 January 2020	Nagoya	Japan	Nagoya Dome	—	—

List of concerts in Oceania
Date	City	Country	Venue	Attendance	Revenue
5 February 2020	Wellington	New Zealand	Westpac Stadium	33,921 / 33,921	$4,597,181
7 February 2020	Auckland	New Zealand	Mount Smart Stadium	27,357 / 27,357	$3,715,732
10 February 2020	Dunedin	New Zealand	Forsyth Barr Stadium	28,919 / 28,919	$3,712,779
13 February 2020	Brisbane	Australia	Suncorp Stadium	40,337 / 40,337	$4,899,923
15 February 2020	Sydney	Australia	ANZ Stadium	60,029 / 60,029	$6,492,672
16 February 2020 (Note: Part of the Fire Fight Australia benefit concert.)	Sydney	Australia	ANZ Stadium	—	—
19 February 2020	Melbourne	Australia	AAMI Park	59,230 / 59,230	$7,471,188
20 February 2020	Melbourne	Australia	AAMI Park	59,230 / 59,230	$7,471,188
23 February 2020	Perth	Australia	Optus Stadium	44,593 / 44,593	$4,707,760
26 February 2020	Adelaide	Australia	Adelaide Oval	42,484 / 42,484	$4,436,072
29 February 2020	Gold Coast	Australia	Metricon Stadium	39,607 / 39,607	$4,536,677

List of concerts in Europe (Note: The European leg of the tour, originally scheduled to take place from May–July 2020, was postponed to 2022 due to the COVID-19 pandemic.)
Date	City	Country	Venue	Attendance	Revenue
27 May 2022	Belfast	Northern Ireland	SSE Arena	18,317 / 18,779	$2,496,960
28 May 2022	Belfast	Northern Ireland	SSE Arena	18,317 / 18,779	$2,496,960
30 May 2022	Manchester	England	AO Arena	30,142 / 30,142	$4,381,781
31 May 2022	Manchester	England	AO Arena	30,142 / 30,142	$4,381,781
2 June 2022	Glasgow	Scotland	OVO Hydro	26,233 / 26,233	$3,686,571
3 June 2022	Glasgow	Scotland	OVO Hydro	26,233 / 26,233	$3,686,571
4 June 2022 (Note: Part of the Platinum Party at the Palace concert)	London	England	Buckingham Palace	—	—
5 June 2022	London	England	The O_{2} Arena	174,485 / 174,485 (Note: Attendance for all 10 shows)	$22,744,678 (Note: Revenue for all 10 shows)
6 June 2022	London	England	The O_{2} Arena	174,485 / 174,485	$22,744,678
8 June 2022	London	England	The O_{2} Arena	174,485 / 174,485	$22,744,678
9 June 2022	London	England	The O_{2} Arena	174,485 / 174,485	$22,744,678
11 June 2022	Birmingham	England	Utilita Arena	—	—
12 June 2022	Birmingham	England	Utilita Arena	—	—
14 June 2022	London	England	The O_{2} Arena		
15 June 2022	London	England	The O_{2} Arena		
17 June 2022	London	England	The O_{2} Arena		
18 June 2022	London	England	The O_{2} Arena		
20 June 2022	London	England	The O_{2} Arena		
21 June 2022	London	England	The O_{2} Arena		
24 June 2022	Berlin	Germany	Mercedes-Benz Arena	11,535 / 11,535	$1,322,696
26 June 2022	Cologne	Germany	Lanxess Arena	14,048 / 14,048	$1,448,054
28 June 2022	Zürich	Switzerland	Hallenstadion	13,500 / 13,500	$1,995,553
29 June 2022	Munich	Germany	Olympiahalle	11,275 / 11,275	$1,342,201
1 July 2022	Amsterdam	Netherlands	Ziggo Dome	—	—
2 July 2022	Amsterdam	Netherlands	Ziggo Dome	—	—
6 July 2022	Madrid	Spain	WiZink Center	27,615 / 31,837	$4,350,727
7 July 2022	Madrid	Spain	WiZink Center	27,615 / 31,837	$4,350,727
10 July 2022	Bologna	Italy	Unipol Arena	—	—
11 July 2022	Bologna	Italy	Unipol Arena	—	—
13 July 2022	Paris	France	Accor Arena	—	—
15 July 2022	Antwerp	Belgium	Sportpaleis	—	—
17 July 2022	Copenhagen	Denmark	Royal Arena	—	—
18 July 2022	Copenhagen	Denmark	Royal Arena	—	—
20 July 2022	Stockholm	Sweden	Avicii Arena	—	—
21 July 2022	Oslo	Norway	Telenor Arena	—	—
24 July 2022	Tampere	Finland	Tampere Deck Arena	—	—
25 July 2022	Tampere	Finland	Tampere Deck Arena	—	—

List of concerts in North America
Date	City	Country	Venue	Attendance	Revenue
4 October 2023	Baltimore	United States	CFG Bank Arena	—	—
5 October 2023	Baltimore	United States	CFG Bank Arena	—	—
8 October 2023	Toronto	Canada	Scotiabank Arena	—	—
10 October 2023	Detroit	United States	Little Caesars Arena	—	—
12 October 2023	New York City	United States	Madison Square Garden	—	—
13 October 2023	New York City	United States	Madison Square Garden	—	—
15 October 2023	Boston	United States	TD Garden	—	—
16 October 2023	Boston	United States	TD Garden	—	—
18 October 2023	Philadelphia	United States	Wells Fargo Center	—	—
21 October 2023 (Note: Part of the 2023 United States Grand Prix.)	Austin	United States	Circuit of the Americas	—	—
23 October 2023	Atlanta	United States	State Farm Arena	—	—
25 October 2023	Nashville	United States	Bridgestone Arena	—	—
27 October 2023	Saint Paul	United States	Xcel Energy Center	—	—
28 October 2023	Saint Paul	United States	Xcel Energy Center	—	—
30 October 2023	Chicago	United States	United Center	—	—
31 October 2023	Chicago	United States	United Center	—	—
2 November 2023	Dallas	United States	American Airlines Center	—	—
3 November 2023	Dallas	United States	American Airlines Center	—	—
5 November 2023	Denver	United States	Ball Arena	—	—
8 November 2023	San Francisco	United States	Chase Center	—	—
9 November 2023	San Francisco	United States	Chase Center	—	—
11 November 2023	Los Angeles	United States	BMO Stadium	—	—
12 November 2023	Los Angeles	United States	BMO Stadium	—	—

List of concerts in Asia
Date	City	Country	Venue	Attendance	Revenue
4 February 2024	Nagoya	Japan	Vantelin Dome	—	—
7 February 2024	Osaka	Japan	Kyocera Dome	—	—
10 February 2024	Sapporo	Japan	Sapporo Dome	—	—
13 February 2024	Tokyo	Japan	Tokyo Dome	—	—
14 February 2024	Tokyo	Japan	Tokyo Dome	—	—
TOTAL				1,076,089 / 1,080,773 (99.6%)	$133,807,954

=== Grossing ===
- 2019: $45.5 million from 25 shows
- 2020: $67.5 million from 16 shows

Total available grossing: $156.7 million from 63 shows.

== Personnel ==
- Freddie Mercury – lead vocals, piano (pre-recorded)
- Brian May – electric and acoustic guitars, vocals
- Roger Taylor – drums, vocals
- John Deacon – bass guitar (pre-recorded)
- Adam Lambert – lead vocals

Additional musicians

- Spike Edney – keyboards, backing vocals
- Neil Fairclough – bass guitar, backing vocals
- Tyler Warren – percussion, additional drums, backing vocals
