= Queen + Adam Lambert Tour 2017–2018 =

2017–18 concert tour by Queen and Adam Lambert

- World tour by Queen + Adam Lambert
- Poster with the European tour dates
- Location: Europe; North America; Oceania
- Start date: 23 June 2017
- End date: 22 September 2018
- Legs: 5
- No. of shows: 88

Queen + Adam Lambert concert chronology
- Queen + Adam Lambert 2016 Summer Festival Tour (2016); Queen + Adam Lambert Tour 2017–2018 (2017–2018); The Rhapsody Tour (2019–2024)

The Queen + Adam Lambert Tour 2017–2018 was a worldwide concert tour by British rock band Queen and American singer Adam Lambert. The North American leg began on 23 June 2017, in Glendale, Arizona at the Gila River Arena and continued throughout the continent until its last show at the Toyota Center in Houston. In Continental Europe, the tour began in Prague on 1 November 2017 and ended in Copenhagen on 22 November before recommencing for a United Kingdom and Ireland arena tour on 25 November. The United Kingdom leg ended with a show at the Arena Birmingham in Birmingham on 16 December 2017. The group then played concerts in Oceania starting on 17 February 2018 in Auckland, ending on 6 March with a show at Perth Arena. The tour had another European leg and finished with a ten show residency in Las Vegas. The tour marks the group's second visits to North America and Oceania, both of which took place in 2014 as part of the Queen + Adam Lambert Tour 2014–2015.

== Background ==
After performing with American Idol finalists Kris Allen and Adam Lambert during the programme's season finale in 2009, the active members of Queen, Brian May and Roger Taylor, began contemplating the future of the band after the group's amicable split with touring collaborator Paul Rodgers. Two years later, at the 2011 MTV Europe Music Awards, Queen was presented that year's Global Icon Award, accepted by May. As part of the broadcast, Queen performed a short set with Lambert, receiving an overwhelmingly welcoming response. Speculation regarding a collaboration with Lambert soon arose, with the three formally announcing a short summer tour of Europe in 2012, including three dates at the Hammersmith Apollo in London, as well as shows in Ukraine, Russia and Poland. As with the partnership with Paul Rodgers, John Deacon chose not to participate.

After a 66-date world tour in 2014–2015 and a well-received European summer tour in 2016, it was announced on 26 January that the group would return to North America for a 25-city tour. The tour includes two nights at the Hollywood Bowl in Los Angeles, as well as shows at the newly constructed T-Mobile Arena in Las Vegas and Barclays Center in Brooklyn. The North American leg ended at the Toyota Center in Houston on 5 August 2017. In April 2017, the group announced European dates scheduled for November and December of that year. Two months later, it was reported that the group would perform in New Zealand and Australia in February and March 2018. In February 2018 a second European leg was announced.

In March 2017, percussionist Rufus Tiger Taylor confirmed in an Instagram post that he would not be touring with the band for the first time since the start of the collaboration with Lambert, citing schedule conflicts with his band The Darkness. His place was taken by longtime Queen Extravaganza drummer Tyler Warren.

== Set list ==
=== 2017 ===
The following is from the June 23, 2017, show in Glendale. It is not intended to represent all dates throughout the tour.

1. "We Will Rock You"
2. "Hammer to Fall"
3. "Stone Cold Crazy"
4. "Another One Bites the Dust"
5. "Fat Bottomed Girls"
6. "Killer Queen"
7. "Two Fux"
8. "Don't Stop Me Now"
9. "Bicycle Race"
10. "I'm In Love With My Car"
11. "Get Down, Make Love"
12. "I Want It All"
13. "Love of My Life"
14. "Somebody to Love"
15. "Crazy Little Thing Called Love"
16. "Drum Battle"
17. "Under Pressure"
18. "Who Wants to Live Forever"(with "You Take My Breath Away" intro on tape)
19. "Last Horizon"
20. "Guitar Solo"
21. "Day-Oh" (Freddie singing at Queen at Wembley)
22. "Radio Ga Ga"
23. "Bohemian Rhapsody"
  Encore
24. "Spread Your Wings"
25. "We Are the Champions"
26. "God Save the Queen" (tape)

=== The Crown Jewels ===
The following is from the September 1, 2018, show in Las Vegas. It is not intended to represent all dates throughout the tour.

1. "We Will Rock You" (fast)
2. "Tie Your Mother Down"
3. "Somebody to Love"
4. "Fat Bottomed Girls"
5. "Killer Queen"
6. "Don't Stop Me Now"
7. "Bicycle Race"
8. "I'm In Love With My Car"
9. "Another One Bites the Dust"
10. "I Want It All"
11. "Love of My Life"
12. "Heartbreak Hotel" (Elvis Presley song)
13. "Crazy Little Thing Called Love"
14. "Drum Battle"
15. "Under Pressure"
16. "Who Wants to Live Forever"(with "You Take My Breath Away" intro on tape)
17. "Guitar Solo"
18. "The Show Must Go On"
19. "Radio Ga Ga"
20. "Bohemian Rhapsody"
  Encore
21. "Day-Oh" (Freddie singing at Queen at Wembley)
22. "We Will Rock You"
23. "We Are the Champions"
24. "God Save the Queen" (tape)

== Tour dates ==
Date	City	Country	Venue	Attendance	Box office
Leg 1 — North America
23 June 2017	Glendale	United States	Gila River Arena	11,041 / 11,635	$1,017,047
24 June 2017	Las Vegas	United States	T-Mobile Arena	11,716 / 15,346	$1,292,650
26 June 2017	Los Angeles	United States	Hollywood Bowl	32,433 / 35,156	$3,182,630
27 June 2017	Los Angeles	United States	Hollywood Bowl	32,433 / 35,156	$3,182,630
29 June 2017	San Jose	United States	SAP Center	11,940 / 12,265	$1,343,607
1 July 2017	Seattle	United States	KeyArena	11,077 / 11,908	$1,138,564
2 July 2017	Vancouver	Canada	Rogers Arena	12,363 / 12,363	$1,114,680
4 July 2017	Edmonton	Canada	Rogers Place	—	—
6 July 2017	Denver	United States	Pepsi Center	8,228 / 13,737	$876,828
8 July 2017	Omaha	United States	CenturyLink Center Omaha	9,155 / 13,883	$734,216
9 July 2017	Kansas City	United States	Sprint Center	10,384 / 10,384	$934,820
13 July 2017	Chicago	United States	United Center	12,537 / 13,725	$1,262,869
14 July 2017	Saint Paul	United States	Xcel Energy Center	13,723 / 14,977	$1,202,548
17 July 2017	Montreal	Canada	Bell Centre	10,624 / 12,651	$904,046
18 July 2017	Toronto	Canada	Air Canada Centre	14,927 / 14,927	$1,482,010
20 July 2017	Auburn Hills	United States	The Palace of Auburn Hills	10,410 / 12,442	$990,523
21 July 2017	Cleveland	United States	Quicken Loans Arena	11,405 / 14,504	$1,073,355
23 July 2017	Uncasville	United States	Mohegan Sun Arena	6,440 / 6,667	$884,680
25 July 2017	Boston	United States	TD Garden	10,984 / 11,486	$1,139,680
26 July 2017	Newark	United States	Prudential Center	10,941 / 10,941	$1,120,744
28 July 2017	Brooklyn	United States	Barclays Center	12,874 / 12,874	$1,337,636
30 July 2017	Philadelphia	United States	Wells Fargo Center	12,335 / 12,850	$1,195,327
31 July 2017	Washington, D.C.	United States	Verizon Center	11,512 / 12,014	$1,252,708
2 August 2017	Nashville	United States	Bridgestone Arena	14,178 / 14,178	$1,297,029
4 August 2017	Dallas	United States	American Airlines Center	11,481 / 11,481	$1,240,050
5 August 2017	Houston	United States	Toyota Center	9,260 / 9,260	$1,034,567
Leg 2 — Europe
1 November 2017	Prague	Czech Republic	O_{2} Arena	—	—
2 November 2017	Munich	Germany	Olympiahalle	—	—
4 November 2017	Budapest	Hungary	László Papp Budapest Sports Arena	—	—
6 November 2017	Łódź	Poland	Atlas Arena	—	—
8 November 2017	Vienna	Austria	Wiener Stadthalle	—	—
10 November 2017	Bologna	Italy	Unipol Arena	—	—
12 November 2017	Amnéville	France	Galaxie Amnéville	—	—
13 November 2017	Amsterdam	Netherlands	Ziggo Dome	—	—
17 November 2017	Kaunas	Lithuania	Žalgiris Arena	—	—
19 November 2017	Helsinki	Finland	Hartwall Arena	—	—
21 November 2017	Stockholm	Sweden	Friends Arena	—	—
22 November 2017	Copenhagen	Denmark	Royal Arena	—	—
25 November 2017	Dublin	Ireland	3Arena	—	—
26 November 2017	Belfast	Northern Ireland	SSE Arena	—	—
28 November 2017	Liverpool	England	Echo Arena Liverpool	—	—
30 November 2017	Birmingham	England	Arena Birmingham	—	—
1 December 2017	Newcastle	England	Metro Radio Arena	—	—
3 December 2017	Glasgow	Scotland	SSE Hydro	11,227 / 11,230	$1,159,380
5 December 2017	Nottingham	England	Motorpoint Arena Nottingham	—	—
6 December 2017	Leeds	England	First Direct Arena	—	—
8 December 2017	Sheffield	England	FlyDSA Arena	—	—
9 December 2017	Manchester	England	Manchester Arena	15,639 / 15,639	$1,626,890
12 December 2017	London	England	The O_{2} Arena	35,049 / 36,922	$3,572,980
13 December 2017	London	England	The O_{2} Arena	35,049 / 36,922	$3,572,980
15 December 2017	London	England	Wembley Arena	—	—
16 December 2017	Birmingham	England	Arena Birmingham	—	—
Leg 3 — Oceania
17 February 2018	Auckland	New Zealand	Spark Arena	19,389 / 19,389	$2,712,350
18 February 2018	Auckland	New Zealand	Spark Arena	19,389 / 19,389	$2,712,350
21 February 2018	Sydney	Australia	Qudos Bank Arena	24,791 / 25,708	$3,357,960
22 February 2018	Sydney	Australia	Qudos Bank Arena	24,791 / 25,708	$3,357,960
24 February 2018	Brisbane	Australia	Brisbane Entertainment Centre	9,681 / 9,681	$1,322,200
27 February 2018	Adelaide	Australia	Adelaide Entertainment Centre	13,936 / 13,936	$1,702,470
28 February 2018	Adelaide	Australia	Adelaide Entertainment Centre	13,936 / 13,936	$1,702,470
2 March 2018	Melbourne	Australia	Rod Laver Arena	24,295 / 24,295	$3,033,680
3 March 2018	Melbourne	Australia	Rod Laver Arena	24,295 / 24,295	$3,033,680
6 March 2018	Perth	Australia	Perth Arena	12,720 / 12,720	$1,732,180
Leg 4 — Europe
7 June 2018	Lisbon	Portugal	Altice Arena	—	—
9 June 2018	Madrid	Spain	WiZink Center	—	—
10 June 2018	Barcelona	Spain	Palau Sant Jordi	—	—
13 June 2018	Cologne	Germany	Lanxess Arena	—	—
15 June 2018	Herning	Denmark	Jyske Bank Boxen	—	—
17 June 2018	Oslo	Norway	Telenor Arena	—	—
19 June 2018	Berlin	Germany	Mercedes Benz Arena	—	—
20 June 2018	Hamburg	Germany	Barclaycard Arena	—	—
25 June 2018	Milan	Italy	Mediolanum Forum	—	—
27 June 2018	Rotterdam	Netherlands	Rotterdam Ahoy	—	—
29 June 2018	Antwerp	Belgium	Sportpaleis	—	—
1 July 2018	London	England	Wembley Arena	10,799 / 10,831	$1,098,510
2 July 2018	London	England	The O_{2} Arena	32,471 / 35,870	$3,276,590
4 July 2018	London	England	The O_{2} Arena	32,471 / 35,870	$3,276,590
6 July 2018 (Note: The 6 July 2018 concert in Glasgow was part of TRNSMT.)	Glasgow	Scotland	Glasgow Green	—	—
8 July 2018	Dublin	Ireland	Marlay Park	—	—
Leg 5 — The Crown Jewels
1 September 2018	Las Vegas	United States	Park Theater	9,024 / 9,753	$1,382,473
2 September 2018	Las Vegas	United States	Park Theater	9,024 / 9,753	$1,382,473
5 September 2018	Las Vegas	United States	Park Theater	13,838 / 14,621	$2,151,922
7 September 2018	Las Vegas	United States	Park Theater	13,838 / 14,621	$2,151,922
8 September 2018	Las Vegas	United States	Park Theater	13,838 / 14,621	$2,151,922
14 September 2018	Las Vegas	United States	Park Theater	9,532 / 9,754	$1,523,605
15 September 2018	Las Vegas	United States	Park Theater	9,532 / 9,754	$1,523,605
19 September 2018	Las Vegas	United States	Park Theater	14,472 / 14,472	$2,396,170
21 September 2018	Las Vegas	United States	Park Theater	14,472 / 14,472	$2,396,170
22 September 2018	Las Vegas	United States	Park Theater	14,472 / 14,472	$2,396,170
TOTAL				548,831 / 586,475 (94%)	$61,102,174

== Personnel ==
- Brian May – electric and acoustic guitars, vocals
- Roger Taylor – drums, vocals
- Adam Lambert – lead vocals
- Freddie Mercury – lead vocals (pre-recorded)
- John Deacon – bass guitar (pre-recorded)

Additional musicians

- Spike Edney – keyboards, backing vocals
- Neil Fairclough – bass guitar, backing vocals
- Tyler Warren – percussion, additional drums, backing vocals
