= Queen + Adam Lambert Tour 2014–2015 =

- World tour by Queen + Adam Lambert
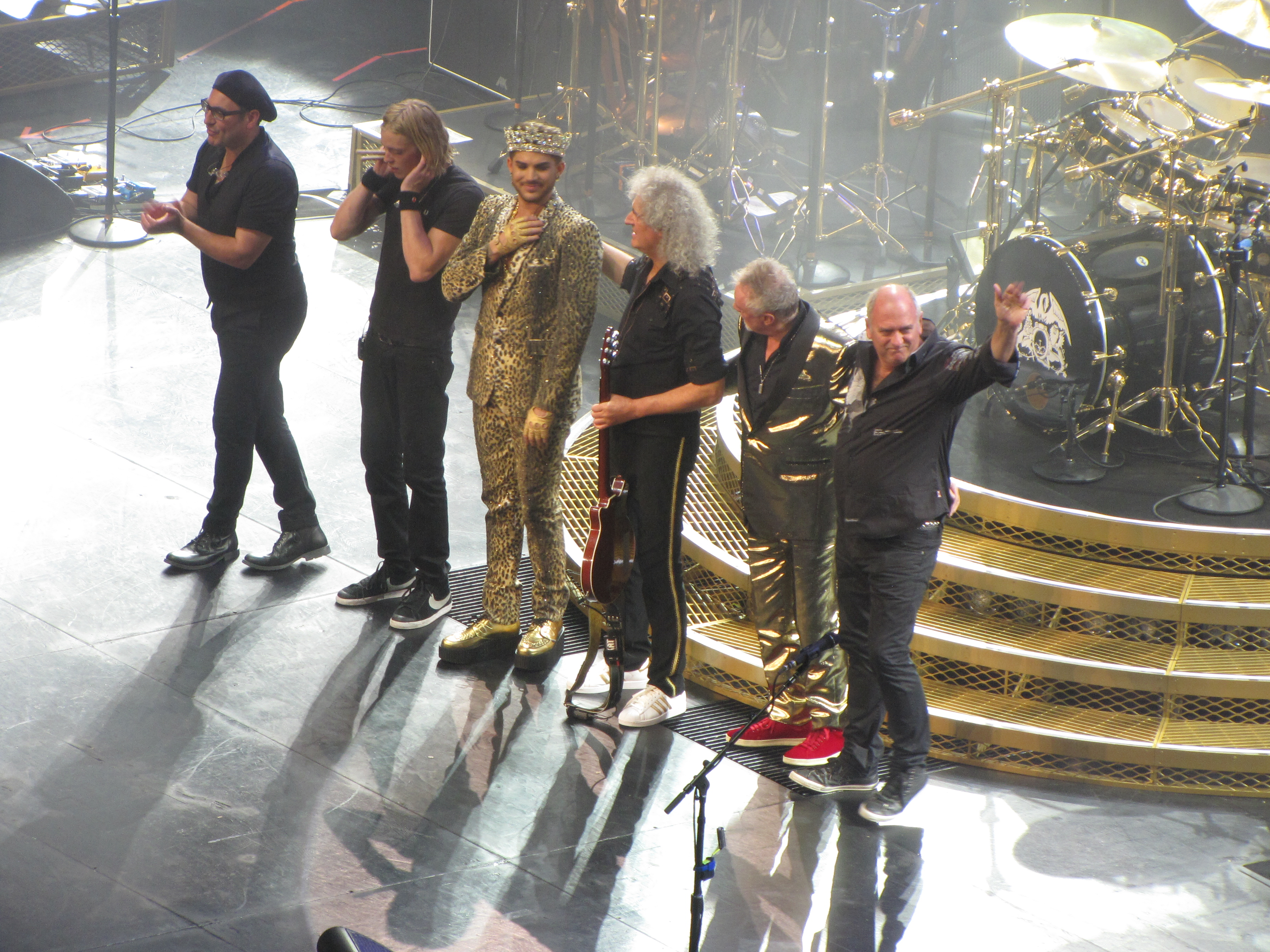
- Queen + Adam Lambert with touring musicians, L-R: Neil Fairclough, Rufus Tiger Taylor, Adam Lambert, Brian May, Roger Taylor and Spike Edney
- Location: Asia; Europe; North America; Oceania; South America
- Start date: 19 June 2014
- End date: 30 September 2015
- Legs: 5
- No. of shows: 67

Queen + Adam Lambert concert chronology
- Queen + Adam Lambert Tour 2012 (2012); Queen + Adam Lambert Tour 2014–2015 (2014–2015); Queen + Adam Lambert 2016 Summer Festival Tour (2016)

The Queen + Adam Lambert Tour 2014–2015 was a worldwide concert tour by British rock band Queen and American singer Adam Lambert during 2014 and 2015. Following on their 2012 tour and their appearance at the 2013 IHeartRadio Music Festival in Las Vegas, the band announced a 2014 tour of North America. Following the success of their North American tour, it was expanded to Australia, New Zealand and Asia in the autumn, then Europe in early 2015. A tour of South America took place in September 2015.

According to Pollstar, the complete tour 2014–2015 grossed $68.7 million, ranked number 35 in the top 100 worldwide tours in 2014 and number 46 in 2015.

== Background ==
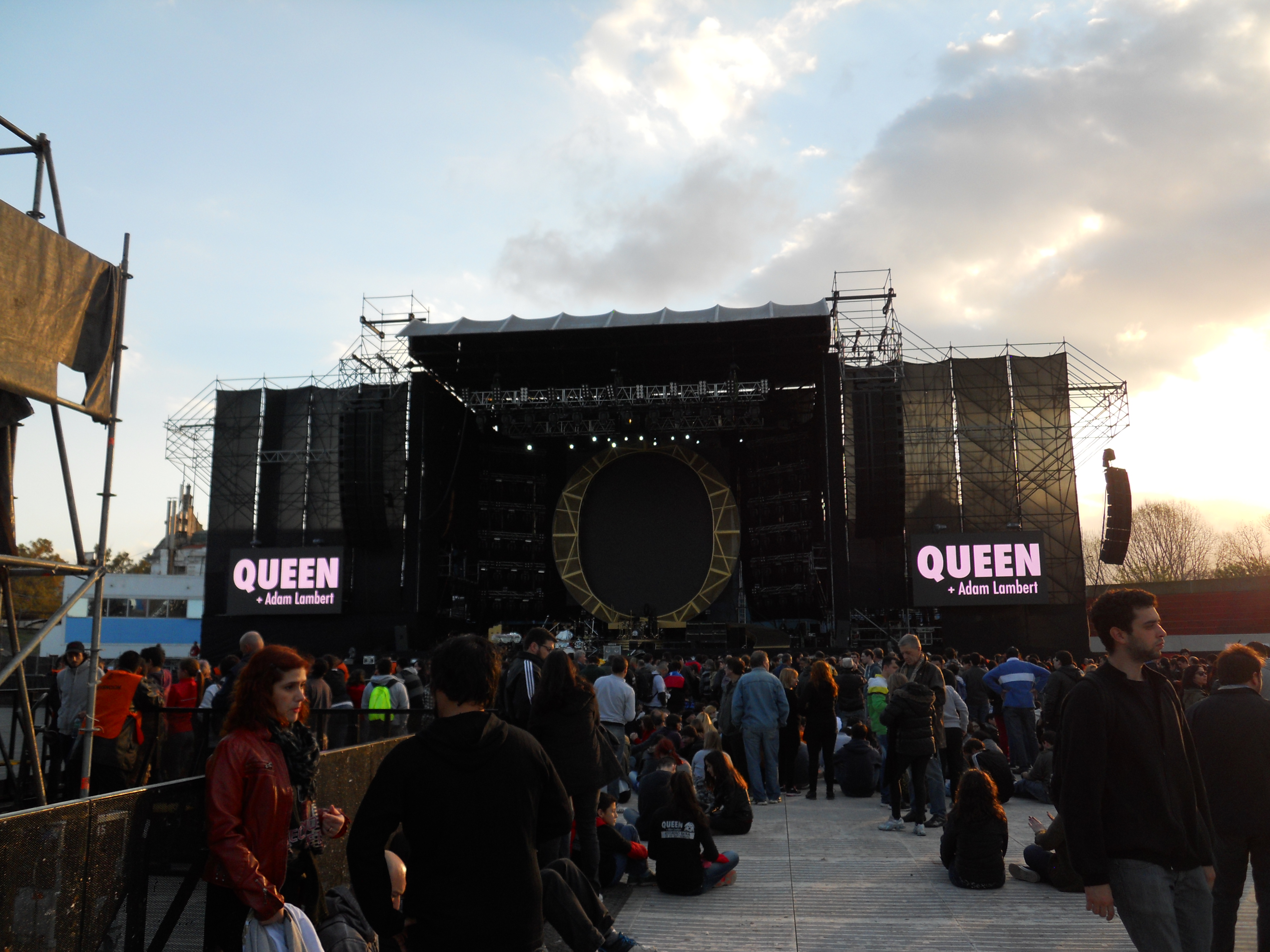
Queen+Adam Lambert stage at their concert in Estadio G.E.B.A. of Buenos Aires

Queen + Adam Lambert first toured together in 2012. The following year, 2013, Queen and Lambert only performed one concert together at the MGM Grand Garden Arena in Las Vegas. This concert was part of the iHeartRadio Music Festival. The band were joined onstage by American band Fun for several songs. The concert was met by positive reviews.

On 6 March 2014, Queen and Lambert announced at a press conference in the United States and via QueenOnline that they would tour North America in June and July 2014 starting in Chicago, including concerts at Madison Square Garden in New York and The Forum in Los Angeles where the band had last performed in 1982. The tour began with an intimate performance at the iHeartRadio Theater in Los Angeles.

On 2 April, it was announced that Queen would play in South Korea for the first time in their careers at the Super Sonic Festival. On the same day, it was announced that Queen and Lambert would play at the same festival franchise in Japan. The last time Queen played in Japan had been with Paul Rodgers eight years previously.

On 19 May, Queen and Lambert announced that they would play several shows in Australia. This was the first time that Queen had played in the country since 1985, twenty-nine years previously. Queen and Lambert were to perform one show each in Perth, Sydney, Melbourne and Brisbane. On 26 May a second date at Melbourne's Rod Laver Arena was added. The following day a second date at Sydney's Allphones Arena was added. On 16 July a concert at Auckland's Vector Arena was announced. A week later, a second concert at the Vector Arena was announced. On 29 September 2014, Queen and Lambert announced a European leg of the tour, including two concerts at The O2 in London on 17 and 18 January 2015.

Three special performances were played for The X Factor UK, the German television special Die Helene Fischer Show on 25 December 2014, and on New Year's Eve at Central Hall Westminster in London where they played "Drowse" for the first time at the rehearsals on 31 December 2014.

== Set lists ==
North American set list
1. "Procession (tape)"
2. "Now I'm Here"
3. "Stone Cold Crazy"
4. "Another One Bites the Dust"
5. "Fat Bottomed Girls"
6. "In the Lap of the Gods... Revisited"
7. "Seven Seas of Rhye"
8. "Killer Queen"
9. "Somebody to Love"
10. "I Want It All"
11. "Love of My Life"
12. "39"
13. "These Are the Days of Our Lives"
14. "Bass Solo"
15. "Drum Battle"
16. "Under Pressure"
17. "Love Kills"
18. "Who Wants to Live Forever"
19. "Last Horizon"
20. "Guitar Solo"
21. "Tie Your Mother Down"
22. "All Your Love Tonight"
23. "Radio Ga Ga"
24. "Crazy Little Thing Called Love"
25. "The Show Must Go On"
26. "Bohemian Rhapsody"

Encore:

27. "We Will Rock You"
28. "We Are the Champions"
29. "God Save the Queen (tape)"

Other Songs:

- "Don't Stop Me Now" was played at most shows in June after "Radio Ga Ga"
- "Dragon Attack" replaced "Love Kills" at the last two shows
- "Bass Solo" and "Vocal Solo" were not played in Chicago
Asian and Oceanic set list
1. "Procession (tape)"
2. "Now I'm Here"
3. "Stone Cold Crazy"
4. "Another One Bites the Dust"
5. "Fat Bottomed Girls"
6. "In the Lap of the Gods... Revisited"
7. "Seven Seas of Rhye"
8. "Killer Queen"
9. "Somebody to Love"
10. "I Want It All"
11. "Love of My Life"
12. "39"
13. "A Kind of Magic"
14. "Bass Solo"
15. "Drum Battle"
16. "Under Pressure"
17. "Dragon Attack"
18. "Who Wants to Live Forever"
19. "Last Horizon"
20. "Guitar Solo"
21. "Tie Your Mother Down"
22. "All Your Love Tonight"
23. "Radio Ga Ga"
24. "Crazy Little Thing Called Love"
25. "Bohemian Rhapsody"

Encore:

26. "We Will Rock You"
27. "We Are the Champions"
28. "God Save the Queen (tape)"

Other Songs:

- "Teo Torriatte (Let Us Cling Together)" was added for the two Japanese shows before "Love of My Life", performed in the acoustic set by Brian
- "I Was Born to Love You" was performed after "Dragon Attack" in South Korea and "Radio Ga Ga" in Japan
- "I Want to Break Free" was added in Australia and New Zealand
- "The Show Must Go On" was added in Melbourne on 30 August before "Bohemian Rhapsody"
- "Waltzing Matilda" was added in Brisbane before "Love of My Life", performed in the acoustic set by Brian
- "Don't Dream It's Over" was added at the second New Zealand show, again performed in the acoustic set by Brian
UK and European set list
1. "One Vision"
2. "Stone Cold Crazy"
3. "Another One Bites the Dust"
4. "Fat Bottomed Girls"
5. "In the Lap of the Gods... Revisited"
6. "Seven Seas of Rhye"
7. "Killer Queen"
8. "I Want to Break Free"
9. "Somebody to Love"
10. "Love of My Life"
11. "39"
12. "These Are the Days of Our Lives"
13. "A Kind of Magic"
14. "Bass Solo"
15. "Drum Battle"
16. "Under Pressure"
17. "Save Me"
18. "Who Wants to Live Forever"
19. "Last Horizon"
20. "Guitar Solo"
21. "Tie Your Mother Down"
22. "All Your Love Tonight"
23. "I Want It All"
24. "Radio Ga Ga"
25. "Crazy Little Thing Called Love"
26. "Bohemian Rhapsody"

Encore:

27. "We Will Rock You"
28. "We Are the Champions"
29. "God Save the Queen (tape)"

Other Songs:

- "Drowse" was played at the soundcheck in London for the New Year's Show, but they never played it on the tour
- "Fog on the Tyne" was played in Newcastle
- "Maybe It's Because I'm a Londoner" was played at The O2 in London on the first night
- "The Show Must Go On" was performed at some shows
- "Plaisir d'amour" was played in Paris
- "Don't Stop Me Now" was only performed in the UK
- "Stone Cold Crazy" was not performed in Cologne and Amsterdam
- "Who Wants to Live Forever" was not performed in Frankfurt
- "Another One Bites the Dust" was not performed in Milan
- "Dragon Attack" was performed in Kraków and at Wembley before "I Want It All"
- "You've Got to Hide Your Love Away" was played in Liverpool
South American set list
1. "One Vision"
2. "Stone Cold Crazy"
3. "Another One Bites the Dust"
4. "Fat Bottomed Girls"
5. "In the Lap of the Gods... Revisited"
6. "Seven Seas of Rhye"
7. "Killer Queen"
8. "Don't Stop Me Now"
9. "I Want to Break Free"
10. "Somebody to Love"
11. "Love of My Life"
12. "39"
13. "These Are the Days of Our Lives"
14. "Bass Solo"
15. "Drum Battle"
16. "Under Pressure"
17. "Save Me"
18. "Ghost Town"
19. "Who Wants to Live Forever"
20. "Last Horizon"
21. "Guitar Solo"
22. "Tie Your Mother Down"
23. "All Your Love Tonight"
24. "I Want It All"
25. "Radio Ga Ga"
26. "Crazy Little Thing Called Love"
27. "The Show Must Go On"
28. "Bohemian Rhapsody"

Encore:

29. "We Will Rock You"
30. "We Are the Champions"
31. "God Save the Queen (tape)"

Other Songs:

- "'39", "Bass Solo" and "Tie Your Mother Down" weren't performed at Rock in Rio.
- "The Show Must Go On" was moved to after the guitar solo at Rock in Rio.
- "A Kind of Magic" was performed instead of "These Are the Days of Our Lives" at Rock in Rio.
- "Las Palabras de Amor" was played in place of "'39" in Argentina.
- The band rehearsed "Let Me Entertain You" in soundchecks before the final show of South America – though it was never performed on tour.
- "Stone Cold Crazy" wasn't performed in Santiago.

== Tour dates ==
List of concerts, showing date, city, country, venue, tickets sold, number of available tickets, and gross revenue

Date	City	Country	Venue	Tickets sold/available	Revenue
Leg 1 – North America
19 June 2014	Chicago	United States	United Center	—	—
21 June 2014	Winnipeg	Canada	Bell MTS Place	—	—
23 June 2014	Saskatoon	Canada	Credit Union Centre	—	—
24 June 2014	Edmonton	Canada	Rexall Place	—	—
26 June 2014	Calgary	Canada	Scotiabank Saddledome	—	—
28 June 2014	Vancouver	Canada	Rogers Arena	—	—
1 July 2014	San Jose	United States	SAP Center	—	—
3 July 2014	Inglewood	United States	The Forum	12,613 / 12,613 (100%)	$1,218,231
5 July 2014	Las Vegas	United States	The Joint	5,388 / 5,388 (100%)	$890,970
6 July 2014	Las Vegas	United States	The Joint	5,388 / 5,388 (100%)	$890,970
9 July 2014	Houston	United States	Toyota Center	—	—
10 July 2014	Dallas	United States	American Airlines Center	11,000 / 13,167 (84%)	$928,240
12 July 2014	Auburn Hills	United States	The Palace of Auburn Hills	12,331 / 14,070 (88%)	$961,050
13 July 2014	Toronto	Canada	Air Canada Centre	14,516 / 14,516 (100%)	$1,209,445
14 July 2014	Montreal	Canada	Bell Centre	10,504 / 12,357 (85%)	$896,483
16 July 2014	Philadelphia	United States	Wells Fargo Center	—	—
17 July 2014	New York City	United States	Madison Square Garden	14,007 / 14,007 (100%)	$1,249,871
19 July 2014	Uncasville	United States	Mohegan Sun Arena	13,982 / 14,101 (99%)	$1,340,490 (Note: The score data is combined from the shows held at the Mohegan Sun Arena on 19 and 25 July 2014.)
20 July 2014	Columbia	United States	Merriweather Post Pavilion	15,000 / 15,000 (100%)	—
22 July 2014	Boston	United States	TD Garden	—	—
23 July 2014	East Rutherford	United States	Meadowlands Arena	—	—
25 July 2014	Uncasville	United States	Mohegan Sun Arena	—	
26 July 2014	Atlantic City	United States	Boardwalk Hall	10,154 / 10,937 (93%)	$722,743
28 July 2014	Toronto	Canada	Air Canada Centre	14,516 / 14,516 (100%)	$1,209,445
Leg 2 – Asia
14 August 2014	Seoul	South Korea	Supersonic – Jamsil Sports Complex	— (Note: The 14 August 2014 concert in Seoul was part of "Supersonic".)	
16 August 2014	Osaka	Japan	Maishima Sports Island	— (Note: The 16, 17 August 2014 concerts in Osaka and Chiba were part of the "Summer Sonic Festival".)	
17 August 2014	Chiba	Japan	Chiba Marine Stadium	—	
Leg 3 – Oceania
22 August 2014	Perth	Australia	Perth Arena	13,285 / 13,285 (100%)	$2,008,590
26 August 2014	Sydney	Australia	Allphones Arena	24,773 / 24,773 (100%)	$3,803,070
27 August 2014	Sydney	Australia	Allphones Arena	24,773 / 24,773 (100%)	$3,803,070
29 August 2014	Melbourne	Australia	Rod Laver Arena	23,327 / 23,327 (100%)	$3,568,480
30 August 2014	Melbourne	Australia	Rod Laver Arena	23,327 / 23,327 (100%)	$3,568,480
1 September 2014	Brisbane	Australia	Brisbane Entertainment Centre	9,334 / 9,334 (100%)	$1,397,860
3 September 2014	Auckland	New Zealand	Vector Arena	—	—
4 September 2014	Auckland	New Zealand	Vector Arena	—	—
Leg 4 – Europe
31 December 2014	London	England	Central Hall Westminster	— (Note: The concert was part of the New Year's Eve 2014 and New Years Day 2015 celebration live on BBC One for "Queen & Adam Lambert Rock Big Ben Live".)	
13 January 2015	Newcastle	England	Metro Radio Arena	—	—
14 January 2015	Glasgow	Scotland	The SSE Hydro	11,423 / 11,472 (99%)	$1,164,860
17 January 2015	London	England	The O_{2} Arena	33,003 / 34,093 (97%)	$3,300,140
18 January 2015	London	England	The O_{2} Arena	33,003 / 34,093 (97%)	$3,300,140
20 January 2015	Leeds	England	First Direct Arena	—	—
21 January 2015	Manchester	England	Manchester Arena	15,607 / 15,892 (98%)	$1,568,870
23 January 2015	Birmingham	England	Barclaycard Arena	—	—
24 January 2015	Nottingham	England	Capital FM Arena Nottingham	—	—
26 January 2015	Paris	France	Zénith de Paris	—	—
29 January 2015	Cologne	Germany	Lanxess Arena	—	—
30 January 2015	Amsterdam	Netherlands	Ziggo Dome	—	—
1 February 2015	Vienna	Austria	Wiener Stadthalle	—	—
2 February 2015	Munich	Germany	Olympiahalle	—	—
4 February 2015	Berlin	Germany	O_{2} World Berlin	10,660 / 11,326 (94%)	$797,512
5 February 2015	Hamburg	Germany	O_{2} World Hamburg	9,804 / 12,780 (77%)	$781,132
7 February 2015	Frankfurt	Germany	Festhalle Frankfurt	—	—
10 February 2015	Milan	Italy	Mediolanum Forum	—	—
13 February 2015	Stuttgart	Germany	Hanns-Martin-Schleyer-Halle	—	—
15 February 2015	Herning	Denmark	Jyske Bank Boxen	—	—
17 February 2015	Prague	Czech Republic	O_{2} Arena	—	—
19 February 2015	Zürich	Switzerland	Hallenstadion	13,000 / 13,000 (100%)	$1,149,070
21 February 2015	Kraków	Poland	Tauron Arena Kraków	—	—
24 February 2015	London	England	Wembley Arena	—	—
26 February 2015	Liverpool	England	Echo Arena Liverpool	—	—
27 February 2015	Sheffield	England	Motorpoint Arena Sheffield	—	—
Leg 5 – South America
16 September 2015	São Paulo	Brazil	Ginásio do Ibirapuera	8,024 / 8,024 (100%)	$730,990
18 September 2015	Rio de Janeiro	Brazil	New City of Rock	— (Note: The 18 September 2015 concert in Rio de Janeiro was part of "Rock in Rio VI".)	
21 September 2015	Porto Alegre	Brazil	Gigantinho	14,882 / 14,882 (100%)	$379,349
25 September 2015	Buenos Aires	Argentina	Estadio G.E.B.A.	—	—
27 September 2015	Córdoba	Argentina	Orfeo Superdomo	—	—
30 September 2015	Santiago	Chile	Estadio Nacional Julio Martínez Prádanos	—	—
Total				296,133 / 307,860 (96%)	$32,617,381

=== Cancelled dates ===
Date	City	Country	Venue	Reason
8 February 2015	Brussels	Belgium	Palais 12	Rescheduled to 15 June 2016 due to Lambert's illness
