= Queen + Adam Lambert 2016 Summer Festival Tour =

2016 concert tour by Queen and Adam Lambert

- Festival tour by Queen + Adam Lambert
- Queen + Adam Lambert with touring musicians
- Location: Asia; Europe
- Start date: 20 May 2016
- End date: 30 September 2016
- Legs: 2
- No. of shows: 24

Queen + Adam Lambert concert chronology
- Queen + Adam Lambert Tour 2014–2015 (2014–2015); Queen + Adam Lambert 2016 Summer Festival Tour (2016); Queen + Adam Lambert Tour 2017–2018 (2017–2018)

The Queen + Adam Lambert 2016 Summer Festival Tour was a summer stadium/festival tour by British rock band Queen and American singer Adam Lambert. The tour began on 20 May 2016, in Lisbon, Portugal at the Bela Vista Park and continued throughout Europe before concluding on 25 June 2016, in Padua, Italy at the Villa Contarini. Afterwards, the band toured throughout Asia, starting in Tel Aviv, Israel at the Yarkon Park on 12 September 2016, and visited the Formula One Singapore Grand Prix on 17 September 2016 at the Marina Bay Street Circuit and concluded on 30 September 2016 in Bangkok, Thailand at the Impact Arena.

== Background and development ==
Following the success of their last world tour, the group announced summer festival shows at Rock in Rio Lisboa, Sweden Rock Festival and Isle of Wight Festival. as well as announcing Asian shows afterwards, including a headline slot at the Formula One Singapore Grand Prix, where they will perform at the Marina Bay Street Circuit, along with other headline acts like Halsey, Imagine Dragons and Kylie Minogue.

== Set lists ==
Lisbon & Barcelona
1. "Flash (tape)"
2. "The Hero"
3. "Hammer to Fall"
4. "Seven Seas of Rhye"
5. "Stone Cold Crazy"
6. "Fat Bottomed Girls"
7. "Play the Game"
8. "Killer Queen"
9. "I Want To Break Free"
10. "Somebody to Love"
11. "Love of My Life"
12. "These Are the Days of Our Lives"
13. "Drum Battle"
14. "Under Pressure"
15. "Crazy Little Thing Called Love"
16. "Don't Stop Me Now"
17. "Another One Bites The Dust"
18. "I Want It All"
19. "Who Wants to Live Forever"
20. "Last Horizon"
21. "Guitar Solo"
22. "Tie Your Mother Down"
23. "The Show Must Go On"
24. "Bohemian Rhapsody"
25. "Radio Ga Ga"

Encore

26. "We Will Rock You"
27. "We Are The Champions"
28. "God Save the Queen (tape)"

Note:

- In Lisbon "Radio Ga Ga" was played during the encore.
Linz & Cologne
1. "One Vision"
2. "Hammer to Fall"
3. "Seven Seas of Rhye"
4. "Stone Cold Crazy"
5. "Fat Bottomed Girls"
6. "Play the Game"
7. "Killer Queen"
8. "I Want To Break Free"
9. "Somebody to Love"
10. "Love of My Life"
11. "These Are the Days of Our Lives"
12. "Drum Battle"
13. "Under Pressure"
14. "Crazy Little Thing Called Love"
15. "Don't Stop Me Now"
16. "Another One Bites The Dust"
17. "I Want It All"
18. "Who Wants to Live Forever"
19. "Last Horizon"
20. "Guitar Solo"
21. "Tie Your Mother Down"
22. "Bohemian Rhapsody"
23. "Radio Ga Ga"

Encore

24. "We Will Rock You"
25. "We Are The Champions"
26. "God Save the Queen (tape)"
Jelling & Helsinki
1. "One Vision"
2. "Hammer to Fall"
3. "Seven Seas of Rhye"
4. "Stone Cold Crazy"
5. "Another One Bites The Dust"
6. "Fat Bottomed Girls"
7. "Play the Game"
8. "Killer Queen"
9. "Don't Stop Me Now"
10. "Somebody to Love"
11. "Love of My Life"
12. "These Are the Days of Our Lives"
13. "Drum Battle"
14. "Under Pressure"
15. "Crazy Little Thing Called Love"
16. "I Want To Break Free"
17. "I Want It All"
18. "Who Wants to Live Forever"
19. "Last Horizon"
20. "Guitar Solo"
21. "Tie Your Mother Down"
22. "Bohemian Rhapsody"
23. "Radio Ga Ga"

Encore

24. "We Will Rock You"
25. "We Are The Champions"
26. "God Save the Queen (tape)"

Note:

- In Helsinki "Who Wants to Live Forever" was not performed.
Tallinn & Sölvesborg
1. "One Vision"
2. "Hammer to Fall"
3. "Seven Seas of Rhye"
4. "Stone Cold Crazy"
5. "Another One Bites The Dust"
6. "Fat Bottomed Girls"
7. "Play the Game"
8. "Killer Queen"
9. "Don't Stop Me Now"
10. "Somebody to Love"
11. "Love of My Life"
12. "A Kind of Magic"
13. "Drum Battle"
14. "Under Pressure"
15. "Crazy Little Thing Called Love"
16. "I Want To Break Free"
17. "I Want It All"
18. "Last Horizon"
19. "Guitar Solo"
20. "Tie Your Mother Down"
21. "Bohemian Rhapsody"
22. "Radio Ga Ga"

Encore

23. "We Will Rock You"
24. "We Are The Champions"
25. "God Save the Queen (tape)"
Newport & Brussels & Zürich & Oświęcim
1. "One Vision"
2. "Hammer to Fall"
3. "Seven Seas of Rhye"
4. "Stone Cold Crazy"
5. "Another One Bites The Dust"
6. "Fat Bottomed Girls"
7. "Play the Game"
8. "Killer Queen"
9. "Don't Stop Me Now"
10. "Somebody to Love"
11. "Love of My Life"
12. "A Kind of Magic"
13. "Drum Battle"
14. "Under Pressure"
15. "Crazy Little Thing Called Love"
16. "I Want To Break Free"
17. "I Want It All"
18. "Who Wants to Live Forever"
19. "Last Horizon"
20. "Guitar Solo"
21. "Tie Your Mother Down"
22. "Bohemian Rhapsody"
23. "Radio Ga Ga"

Encore

24. "We Will Rock You"
25. "We Are The Champions"
26. "God Save the Queen (tape)"

Note:

- In Oświęcim "Drum Battle" was not played due to strong rain.
Bucharest & Sofia & Padua
1. "Flash (tape)"
2. "The Hero"
3. "One Vision"
4. "Hammer to Fall"
5. "Seven Seas of Rhye"
6. "Stone Cold Crazy"
7. "Another One Bites The Dust"
8. "Fat Bottomed Girls"
9. "Play the Game"
10. "Killer Queen"
11. "Don't Stop Me Now"
12. "Somebody to Love"
13. "Love of My Life"
14. "A Kind of Magic"
15. "Drum Battle"
16. "Under Pressure"
17. "Crazy Little Thing Called Love"
18. "I Want To Break Free"
19. "I Want It All"
20. "Who Wants to Live Forever"
21. "Last Horizon"
22. "Guitar Solo"
23. "Tie Your Mother Down"
24. "Bohemian Rhapsody"
25. "Radio Ga Ga"

Encore

26. "We Will Rock You"
27. "We Are The Champions"
28. "God Save the Queen (tape)"
Tel Aviv
1. "Seven Seas of Rhye"
2. "Keep Yourself Alive"
3. "Hammer to Fall"
4. "Stone Cold Crazy"
5. "Fat Bottomed Girls"
6. "Don't Stop Me Now"
7. "Killer Queen"
8. "Somebody to Love"
9. "Love of My Life"
10. "These Are the Days of Our Lives"
11. "Drum Battle"
12. "Under Pressure"
13. "Crazy Little Thing Called Love"
14. "Dragon Attack
15. "Another One Bites The Dust"
16. "I Want It All"
17. "Last Horizon"
18. "Guitar Solo"
19. "Who Wants to Live Forever"
20. "The Show Must Go On"
21. "Tie Your Mother Down"
22. "I Want To Break Free"
23. "Bohemian Rhapsody"
24. "Radio Ga Ga"

Encore

25. "We Will Rock You"
26. "We Are The Champions"
27. "God Save the Queen (tape)
Singapore
1. "Seven Seas of Rhye"
2. "Hammer to Fall"
3. "Stone Cold Crazy"
4. "Fat Bottomed Girls"
5. "Don't Stop Me Now"
6. "Killer Queen"
7. "Somebody to Love"
8. "Love of My Life"
9. "A Kind of Magic"
10. "Drum Battle"
11. "Under Pressure"
12. "Crazy Little Thing Called Love"
13. "Another One Bites The Dust"
14. "I Want It All"
15. "Last Horizon"
16. "Guitar Solo"
17. "Who Wants to Live Forever"
18. "The Show Must Go On"
19. "Tie Your Mother Down"
20. "I Want To Break Free"
21. "Bohemian Rhapsody"
22. "Radio Ga Ga"

Encore

23. "We Will Rock You"
24. "We Are The Champions"
25. "God Save the Queen (tape)
Taipei
1. "Seven Seas of Rhye"
2. "Hammer to Fall"
3. "Stone Cold Crazy"
4. "Fat Bottomed Girls"
5. "Don't Stop Me Now"
6. "Killer Queen"
7. "Somebody to Love"
8. "Love of My Life"
9. "These Are the Days of Our Lives"
10. "Drum Battle"
11. "Under Pressure"
12. "Crazy Little Thing Called Love"
13. "Another One Bites The Dust"
14. "I Want It All"
15. "Who Wants to Live Forever"
16. "The Show Must Go On"
17. "Last Horizon"
18. "Guitar Solo"
19. "Tie Your Mother Down"
20. "I Want To Break Free"
21. "Bohemian Rhapsody"
22. "Radio Ga Ga"

Encore

23. "We Will Rock You"
24. "We Are The Champions"
25. "God Save the Queen (tape)
Tokyo
1. "Seven Seas of Rhye"
2. "Hammer to Fall"
3. "Stone Cold Crazy"
4. "Fat Bottomed Girls"
5. "Don't Stop Me Now"
6. "Killer Queen"
7. "Somebody to Love"
8. "Love of My Life"
9. "Teo Torriatte (Let Us Cling Together)"
10. "These Are the Days of Our Lives"
11. "Drum Battle"
12. "Under Pressure"
13. "Crazy Little Thing Called Love"
14. "Another One Bites The Dust"
15. "I Want It All"
16. "Who Wants to Live Forever"
17. "The Show Must Go On"
18. "Last Horizon"
19. "Guitar Solo"
20. "Tie Your Mother Down"
21. "I Want to Break Free"
22. "I Was Born to Love You"
23. "Bohemian Rhapsody"
24. "Radio Ga Ga"

Encore

25. "We Will Rock You"
26. "We Are The Champions"
27. "God Save the Queen (tape)

Notes:

- During Tokyo night two and three "The Show Must Go On" was not performed.
- During Tokyo night two "A Kind Of Magic" replaced "These Are the Days of Our Lives".
Shanghai & Hong Kong & Bangkok
1. "Seven Seas of Rhye"
2. "Hammer to Fall"
3. "Stone Cold Crazy"
4. "Fat Bottomed Girls"
5. "Don't Stop Me Now"
6. "Killer Queen"
7. "Somebody to Love"
8. "Love of My Life"
9. "A Kind of Magic"
10. "Drum Battle"
11. "Under Pressure"
12. "Crazy Little Thing Called Love"
13. "Another One Bites The Dust"
14. "I Want It All"
15. "Who Wants to Live Forever"
16. "The Show Must Go On"
17. "Last Horizon"
18. "Guitar Solo"
19. "Tie Your Mother Down"
20. "I Want to Break Free"
21. "Bohemian Rhapsody"
22. "Radio Ga Ga"

Encore

22. "We Will Rock You"
23. "We Are The Champions"
24. "God Save the Queen (tape)

Note:

- In Shanghai "Another One Bites the Dust" was not performed.

== Tour dates ==
Date	City	Country	Venue	Attendance	Box office
Leg 1 – Europe
20 May 2016	Lisbon	Portugal	Bela Vista Park	— (Note: The 20 May 2016 concert at Bela Vista Park in Lisbon, Portugal was part of Rock in Rio Lisboa VII.)	
22 May 2016	Barcelona	Spain	Palau Sant Jordi	—	—
25 May 2016	Linz	Austria	Linzer Stadion	— (Note: The 25 May 2016 concert at the Linzer Stadion in Linz, Austria was part of the Linz Steel City Festival.)	
27 May 2016	Cologne	Germany	RheinEnergieStadion	—	—
29 May 2016	Jelling	Denmark	Jelling Festival Grounds	— (Note: The 29 May 2016 concert at the Festival Grounds in Jelling, Denmark was part of Jelling Musikfestival.)	
3 June 2016	Helsinki	Finland	Kaisaniemi Park	—	—
5 June 2016	Tallinn	Estonia	Tallinn Song Festival Grounds	—	—
9 June 2016	Sölvesborg	Sweden	Sölvesborg Norje	— (Note: The 9 June 2016 concert at Sölvesborg Norje in Sölvesborg, Sweden was part of the Sweden Rock Festival.)	
12 June 2016	Newport	England	Seaclose Park	— (Note: The 12 June 2016 concert at Seaclose Park in Newport, England was part of the Isle of Wight Festival.)	
15 June 2016	Brussels	Belgium	Palais 12	—	—
17 June 2016	Zürich	Switzerland	Autobahnkreisel	— (Note: The 17 June 2016 concert at Autobahnkreisel in Zürich, Switzerland was part of Rock the Ring Festival.)	
19 June 2016	Oświęcim	Poland	Stadion Sportowy MOSIR	— (Note: The 19 June 2016 concert at Stadion Sportowy MOSIR in Oświęcim, Poland was part of Life Festival Oświęcim.)	
21 June 2016	Bucharest	Romania	Piața Constituției	25,000	—
23 June 2016	Sofia	Bulgaria	Georgi Asparuhov Stadium	35,000	—
25 June 2016	Padua	Italy	Villa Contarini	—	—
Leg 2 – Asia
12 September 2016	Tel Aviv	Israel	Yarkon Park	50,000	
17 September 2016	Singapore		F1 Marina Bay Street Circuit	— (Note: The 17 September 2016 concert at the Marina Bay Street Circuit in Marina Bay, Singapore was part of the Formula 1 Singapore Airlines Singapore Grand Prix.)	
19 September 2016	Taipei	Taiwan	Nangang Exhibition Hall	—	—
21 September 2016	Tokyo	Japan	Nippon Budokan	—	—
22 September 2016	Tokyo	Japan	Nippon Budokan	—	—
23 September 2016	Tokyo	Japan	Nippon Budokan	—	—
26 September 2016	Shanghai	China	Mercedes-Benz Arena	—	—
28 September 2016	Hong Kong		AsiaWorld–Arena	—	—
30 September 2016	Bangkok	Thailand	Impact Arena	—	—
TOTAL				—	—

== Personnel ==
- Brian May – electric and acoustic guitars, vocals
- Roger Taylor – drums, percussion, vocals
- Adam Lambert – lead vocals
- Freddie Mercury – lead vocals (pre-recorded)

Additional musicians

- Spike Edney – keyboards, backing vocals
- Neil Fairclough – bass guitar, backing vocals
- Rufus Tiger Taylor – percussion, additional drums, backing vocals
