= Live Around the World (Queen + Adam Lambert album) =

2020 live album by Queen + Adam Lambert

Live album by Queen + Adam Lambert
- Released: 2 October 2020
- Recorded: 16 June 2014 – 16 February 2020
- Venue: Various
- Length: 75:25
- Label: Hollywood; EMI
- Producer: Roger Taylor; Brian May; Adam Lambert; Justin Shirley-Smith; Joshua J Macrae; Kris Fredriksson

Queen + Adam Lambert chronology
Live in Japan (2016)	Live Around the World (2020)

Live Around the World is the second (first internationally) live album by Queen + Adam Lambert, released on 2 October 2020 by Hollywood Records in North America and EMI worldwide. It is a compilation of songs performed at various shows between June 2014 and February 2020. The album was also released on DVD and Blu-ray with additional songs omitted on the CD and vinyl releases.

Professional ratings
Review scores
Source	Rating
AllMusic	4/5 stars
Classic Rock	3.5/5 stars

Live Around the World became Queen's first chart-topping album since 1995's Made in Heaven.

== Track listings ==
=== CD and vinyl ===
Side one
No.	Title	Writer(s)	Recorded	Length
1.	"Tear It Up"	Brian May	Live at The O2, London, United Kingdom, 2 July 2018	3:04
2.	"Now I'm Here"	May	Live at Summer Sonic, Tokyo, Japan, 17 August 2014	5:06
3.	"Another One Bites the Dust"	John Deacon	Live at Summer Sonic, Tokyo, Japan, 17 August 2014	3:22
4.	"Fat Bottomed Girls" (featuring Dallas Cowboys Cheerleaders)	May	Live at American Airlines Center, Dallas, United States, 23 July 2019	5:27

Side two
No.	Title	Writer(s)	Recorded	Length
5.	"Don't Stop Me Now"	Freddie Mercury	Live at Rock in Rio, Lisbon, Portugal, 20 May 2016	4:10
6.	"I Want to Break Free"	Deacon	Live at Rock in Rio, Lisbon, Portugal, 20 May 2016	3:33
7.	"Somebody to Love"	Mercury	Live at Isle of Wight Festival, Newport, Isle of Wight, United Kingdom, 12 June 2016	5:58
8.	"Love Kills - The Ballad"	Mercury; Giorgio Moroder	Live at iHeart Radio Theater, Los Angeles, United States, 16 June 2014	4:17

Side three
No.	Title	Writer(s)	Recorded	Length
9.	"I Was Born to Love You"	Mercury	Live at Summer Sonic, Tokyo, Japan, 17 August 2014	4:04
10.	"Under Pressure"	Roger Taylor; Mercury; David Bowie; Deacon; May	Live at Global Citizen Festival, New York City, United States, 28 September 2019	3:45
11.	"Who Wants to Live Forever"	May	Live at Isle of Wight Festival, Newport, United Kingdom, 12 June 2016	4:40
12.	"The Show Must Go On"	May	Live at The O2, London, United Kingdom, 4 July 2018	4:17
13.	"Love of My Life"	Mercury	Live at The O2, London, United Kingdom, 2 July 2018	4:13

Side four
No.	Title	Writer(s)	Recorded	Length
14.	"Bohemian Rhapsody"	Mercury	Live at Fire Fight Australia, ANZ Stadium, Sydney, Australia, 16 February 2020	2:20
15.	"Radio Ga Ga"	Taylor	Live at Fire Fight Australia, ANZ Stadium, Sydney, Australia, 16 February 2020	4:23
16.	"Ay-Ohs"	Mercury	Live at Fire Fight Australia, ANZ Stadium, Sydney, Australia, 16 February 2020	1:08
17.	"Hammer to Fall"	May	Live at Fire Fight Australia, ANZ Stadium, Sydney, Australia, 16 February 2020	4:53
18.	"Crazy Little Thing Called Love"	Mercury	Live at Fire Fight Australia, ANZ Stadium, Sydney, Australia, 16 February 2020	4:03
19.	"We Will Rock You"	May	Live at Fire Fight Australia, ANZ Stadium, Sydney, Australia, 16 February 2020	2:29
20.	"We Are the Champions"	Mercury	Live at Fire Fight Australia, ANZ Stadium, Sydney, Australia, 16 February 2020	4:36

=== Blu-ray / DVD ===
No.	Title	Writer(s)	Recorded	Length
1.	"Tear It Up"	May	Live at The O2, London, United Kingdom, 2 July 2018	3:50
2.	"Now I'm Here"	May	Live at Summer Sonic, Tokyo, Japan, 17 August 2014	5:38
3.	"Another One Bites the Dust"	Deacon	Live at Summer Sonic, Tokyo, Japan, 17 August 2014	3:20
4.	"Fat Bottomed Girls" (featuring Dallas Cowboys Cheerleaders)	May	Live at American Airlines Center, Dallas, United States, 23 July 2019	6:20
5.	"Don't Stop Me Now"	Mercury	Live at Rock in Rio, Lisbon, Portugal, 20 May 2016	4:05
6.	"I Want to Break Free"	Deacon	Live at Rock in Rio, Lisbon, Portugal, 20 May 2016	3:35
7.	"Somebody to Love"	Mercury	Live at Isle of Wight Festival, Newport, Isle of Wight, United Kingdom, 12 June 2016	5:53
8.	"Love Kills - The Ballad"	Mercury; Moroder	Live at iHeart Radio Theater, Los Angeles, United States, 16 June 2014	4:20
9.	"I Was Born to Love You"	Mercury	Live at Summer Sonic, Tokyo, Japan, 17 August 2014	4:00
10.	"Drum Battle"	Taylor	Live at Qudos Bank Arena, Sydney, Australia, August 2014	2:29
11.	"Under Pressure"	Taylor; Mercury; Bowie; Deacon; May	Live at Global Citizen Festival, New York City, United States, 28 September 2019	3:50
12.	"Who Wants to Live Forever"	May	Live at Isle of Wight Festival, Newport, Isle of Wight, United Kingdom, 12 June 2016	4:35
13.	"Guitar Solo - Last Horizon"	May	Live at The O2, London, United Kingdom, July 2018	10:12
14.	"The Show Must Go On"	May	Live at The O2, London, United Kingdom, 4 July 2018	4:14
15.	"Love of My Life"	Mercury	Live at The O2, London, United Kingdom, 2 July 2018	6:14
16.	"Bohemian Rhapsody"	Mercury	Live at Fire Fight Australia, ANZ Stadium, Sydney, Australia, 16 February 2020	2:23
17.	"Radio Ga Ga"	Taylor	Live at Fire Fight Australia, ANZ Stadium, Sydney, Australia, 16 February 2020	4:20
18.	"Ay-Ohs"	Mercury	Live at Fire Fight Australia, ANZ Stadium, Sydney, Australia, 16 February 2020	1:08
19.	"Hammer to Fall"	May	Live at Fire Fight Australia, ANZ Stadium, Sydney, Australia, 16 February 2020	5:01
20.	"Crazy Little Thing Called Love"	Mercury	Live at Fire Fight Australia, ANZ Stadium, Sydney, Australia, 16 February 2020	4:04
21.	"We Will Rock You"	May	Live at Fire Fight Australia, ANZ Stadium, Sydney, Australia, 16 February 2020	2:32
22.	"We Are the Champions"	Mercury	Live at Fire Fight Australia, ANZ Stadium, Sydney, Australia, 16 February 2020	4:20

== Personnel ==
- Freddie Mercury – lead vocals (archival footage from Live at Wembley during "Ay-Ohs" and "Love of My Life")
- Brian May – guitar, backing and lead vocals
- Roger Taylor – drums, percussion, backing and lead vocals
- Adam Lambert – lead vocals
- Spike Edney – piano, keyboards, synth, vocoder, backing vocals
- Neil Fairclough – bass guitar, backing vocals
- Tyler Warren – percussion, additional drums, backing vocals (on songs from 2017-2020 performances)
- Rufus Tiger Taylor – percussion, additional drums, backing vocals (on songs from 2014-2017 performances)

== Charts ==
=== Weekly charts ===
Weekly chart performance for Live Around the World
Chart (2020–2021)	Peak position
Australian Albums (ARIA)	1
Austrian Albums (Ö3 Austria)	6
Belgian Albums (Ultratop Flanders)	14
Belgian Albums (Ultratop Wallonia)	13
Czech Albums (ČNS IFPI)	61
Danish Albums (Hitlisten)	28
Dutch Albums (Album Top 100)	6
Finnish Albums (Suomen virallinen lista)	14
French Albums (SNEP)	56
German Albums (Offizielle Top 100)	5
Hungarian Albums (MAHASZ)	14
Irish Albums (OCC)	22
Italian Albums (FIMI)	23
Japanese Albums (Oricon)	10
New Zealand Albums (RMNZ)	4
Polish Albums (ZPAV)	17
Portuguese Albums (AFP)	3
Scottish Albums (OCC)	1
Slovak Albums (ČNS IFPI)	87
Spanish Albums (PROMUSICAE)	20
Swiss Albums (Schweizer Hitparade)	5
UK Albums (OCC)	1
US Billboard 200	56
US Top Hard Rock Albums (Billboard)	5
US Top Rock Albums (Billboard)	10

=== Year-end charts ===
Year-end chart performance for Live Around the World
Chart (2020)	Position
Australian Albums (ARIA)	73

== Certifications ==
Region	Certification	Certified units/sales
United Kingdom (BPI)	Silver	60,000^{‡}
^{‡} Sales+streaming figures based on certification alone.
