= Long Away =

1976 song by Queen

Single by Queen

from the album A Day at the Races
- B-side: "You and I"
- Released: 7 June 1977
- Recorded: 1976
- Genre: Rock
- Length: 3:33
- Label: Elektra
- Songwriter: Brian May
- Producer: Queen

Queen singles chronology
| "Teo Torriatte (Let Us Cling Together)" (1977) | "Long Away" (1977) | "We Are the Champions" / "We Will Rock You" (1977) |

"Long Away" is a song by the British rock band Queen; it is the third track on their 1976 album A Day at the Races. Brian May wrote the song and sings the lead vocals. It was released as the third single from the album in North America and New Zealand only.

== Recording ==
It is one of the few songs where May uses a guitar other than his Red Special. For the rhythm guitar parts, he used an electric Burns twelve string guitar (although he used the Red Special for the second guitar solo in the middle section of the track). Originally, May wanted to use a Rickenbacker guitar (as he admired John Lennon), but he didn't get along well with the Rickenbacker's thin neck.

Roger Taylor sings the highest parts of the song.

== Meaning ==
The song has a sad tone, describing that "for every star in heaven / there's a sad soul here today," and an overall sense of melancholic nostalgia lies over the song. It is similar in feel to the song '39 from A Night at the Opera, although without the folk influence.

== Reception ==
The Washington Post described it as "an affectionate recreation of the mid-'60s Beatles/Byrds sound," and one of the best songs on the album. Wesley Strick of Circus magazine, in a mixed review of the album, named the album's best song and also noted the influence of the Beatles and the Byrds. He observed that Long Away was "haunting" and "never smart-ass or strickly for laughs, "Long Away" - unlike most of Races - feels real." Cash Box said that "this gentle tune is built from endless layers of strummed guitars, showcasing the versatile Freddie Mercury's sweetest voice and the group's distinctive high register harmonies."

== Other album appearances ==
The song also appears on two Queen compilation albums: Deep Cuts, Volume 1 (1973–1976) (2011) and Queen Forever (2014).

== Band comments on the song ==
"Long Away" is a twelve-string thing written by Brian... very interesting harmonies.

— Freddie Mercury, 1977

If I'm honest, I think I would like to be remembered for a few of the songs, none of which were really hits, but some of which had a lot of emotion in them: White Queen and Let Us Cling Together and Long Away off the A Day At The Races album. And We Will Rock You.

— Brian May, 1982

== Personnel ==
Queen

- Brian May – lead and backing vocals, guitars
- Freddie Mercury – backing vocals
- Roger Taylor – drums, percussion, backing vocals, co-lead vocals (phrase "Look for a day")
- John Deacon – bass guitar
