= Queen + Adam Lambert Rock Big Ben Live =

Queen + Adam Lambert Rock Big Ben Live was a concert on New Year's Eve 2014 and New Years Day 2015 performed by Queen + Adam Lambert to celebrate the New Year in the UK. It was performed in the shadow of Big Ben in Central Hall Westminster in Central London.

The concert was broadcast live on BBC One from 23:15 to 00:30. From around 23:59 to 00:10, the show paused for the chimes of the Big Ben in the New Year countdown and the firework display in London. The band returned with after the fireworks ended. The TV coverage was presented by BBC Radio 1 DJs Greg James and Gemma Cairney. There was also a live stream on BBC Music.

== Setlist ==
1. "Don't Stop Me Now"
2. "I Want to Break Free"
3. "Somebody to Love"
4. "Another One Bites the Dust"
5. "Under Pressure"
6. "Fat Bottomed Girls"
7. "Radio Ga Ga"
8. "I Want It All"
9. "Crazy Little Thing Called Love"
10. "The Show Must Go On"
  Encore:
11. "Bohemian Rhapsody"/"Killer Queen" medley
12. "We Will Rock You"
13. "We Are The Champions"
14. "God Save the Queen (Instrumental played from tape)"

Notes

- "Bohemian Rhapsody" featured vocals & piano from a recording of Freddie Mercury from Queen Rock Montreal.
- The start of "We Will Rock You" featured bagpipes.
- Also, A Kind of Magic was used for the opening and closing credits for the TV coverage.
- During the rehearsals, "Drowse" was performed - though it wasn't performed on the tour.

== TV Ratings ==
The first part of the concert had an average overnight viewing figure of 5.83 million and the second part had 10 million viewers.

== Band ==
- Brian May - guitar, vocals
- Roger Taylor - drums, percussion, vocals
- Adam Lambert - vocals
- Spike Edney - keyboards, backing vocals
- Neil Fairclough - bass, backing vocals
- Rufus Tiger Taylor - percussion, drums, backing vocals
- Freddie Mercury - pre-recorded piano & vocals on "Bohemian Rhapsody"
- John Jamieson - bagpipes on "We Will Rock You"
