= '39 =

1976 song by Queen

- The back sleeve of the Italian single sleeve for "You're My Best Friend"

Song by Queen

from the album A Night at the Opera
- A-side: "You're My Best Friend"
- Published: Queen Music Ltd.
- Released: 18 June 1976
- Recorded: August–November 1975
- Genre: Progressive rock; pop rock; folk; skiffle
- Length: 3:30
- Label: EMI; Elektra
- Songwriter: Brian May
- Producers: Roy Thomas Baker; Queen

"'39" is a song by British rock band Queen. Composed and sung by lead guitarist Brian May, it is the fifth track on their fourth studio album A Night at the Opera. The song was also the B-side to "You're My Best Friend".

Inspired by May's studies in astrophysics, the song relates the tale of a group of astronauts who embark on what is, from their perspective, a year-long voyage. Upon their return, however, they realise that a hundred years have passed on Earth due to the effects of time dilation from traveling at relativistic speeds, and the loved ones they left behind are now all dead or aged.

== Recording ==
I felt a little like that about my home at the time, having been away and seen this vastly different world of rock music which was totally different from the way I was brought up. People may not generally admit it but I think that when most people write songs there is more than one level to them – they'll be about one thing on the surface, but underneath they're probably trying, maybe even unconsciously, to say something about their own life, their own experience – and in nearly all my stuff, there is a personal feeling.

— Brian May, on the meaning of "'39"

May sings lead vocal on the studio recording of the song, one of his few lead vocals on Queen recordings.

May had asked bassist John Deacon to play double bass as a joke but a couple of days later he found Deacon in the studio with the instrument, and he had already learned to play it.

May had been working on his thesis in astrophysics, but eventually abandoned his studies to pursue his career with Queen. In 2006, he resumed his studies and eventually completed his thesis, titled A Survey of Radial Velocities in the Zodiacal Dust Cloud, and received his PhD in 2008.

Since Queen had named their albums A Night at the Opera and A Day at the Races after two of the Marx Brothers' most popular films, surviving brother Groucho Marx invited Queen to visit him at his Los Angeles home in March 1977 (five months before he died). The band thanked him, and performed "'39" a cappella.

The song is the 39th album track released by the band when counting each album track from the debut album onwards.

== Live performances ==
The song was a live favourite throughout the 1970s, often being used as a singalong in concert. It was first performed in Edinburgh in September 1976 and remained in setlists until December 1979, although the song was briefly performed in 1984. Instead of May singing the lead vocals live, Mercury did. The Guardian later commented that live performances of the song were played as "a raucous, rollicking sea shanty".

The version recorded at concert at Festhalle Frankfurt on 2 February 1979 is featured on the live album Live Killers.

George Michael performed "'39" at the Freddie Mercury Tribute Concert in April 1992. Michael cited this song as his favourite Queen song, saying he used to busk it on the London Underground.

Later the song was included by Queen on the setlists of their Queen + Adam Lambert tours in 2012 and 2014–2015 featuring Adam Lambert & both Queen + Paul Rodgers Tours, which were Queen + Paul Rodgers Tour & Rock the Cosmos featuring Paul Rodgers; as on the album, it is sung by May.

== Personnel ==
Information is taken from the album's Liner Notes except where noted

- Brian May – lead vocals, backing vocals, 12-string acoustic guitar, electric guitar
- Freddie Mercury – backing vocals
- Roger Taylor – tambourine, bass drum, backing vocals
- John Deacon – double bass
