= Queen + Adam Lambert Tour 2012 =

2012 concert tour by Queen + Adam Lambert

- European tour by Queen + Adam Lambert
- Poster to the concert in Wroclaw, Poland
- Location: Europe
- Start date: 30 June 2012
- End date: 14 July 2012
- No. of shows: 6

Queen concert chronology
- Rock the Cosmos Tour (2008); Queen + Adam Lambert Tour 2012 (2012); Queen + Adam Lambert Tour 2014–2015 (2014–2015)

The Queen + Adam Lambert Tour 2012 was a European concert tour that was the first touring collaboration between British rock band Queen and American singer Adam Lambert.

== History ==
Adam Lambert first performed with Queen as a contestant on the eighth season of American Idol. Soon after the performance, Brian May indicated to Rolling Stone that he was considering Lambert as a front-man for Queen. In November 2011, Adam Lambert joined Queen for a special performance at the MTV Europe Awards in Belfast. It was then reported in December 2011 that Taylor and May had begun discussions with Lambert for him to front Queen in concert.

The tour began in June 2012 at Kyiv's Independence Square, a joint show with Elton John in aid of the Elena Pinchuk ANTIAIDS Foundation. Following the Kyiv concert, the group was set to play a number of festival dates. The UK Sonisphere Festival was cancelled and Queen and Lambert instead performed three sold out concerts at London's Hammersmith Apollo to wrap up the tour.

== Setlist ==
Average setlist
1. "Flash" (tape)
2. "Seven Seas of Rhye"
3. "Keep Yourself Alive"
4. "We Will Rock You" (Fast)
5. "Fat Bottomed Girls"
6. "Don't Stop Me Now"
7. "Under Pressure"
8. "I Want It All"
9. "Who Wants to Live Forever"
10. "A Kind of Magic"
11. "These Are the Days of Our Lives"
12. "Life Is Real (Song for Lennon)" (played once on 3 July)
13. "You're My Best Friend" (excerpt played acoustically on 14 July)
14. "Love of My Life"
15. "'39"
16. "Dragon Attack"
17. "Drum Battle"
18. "Guitar Solo"
19. "Somebody to Love" (played at every show including an excerpt played acoustically instead of normal version on 12 July before "Love of My Life" and it was performed after "I Want It All" on 14 July)
20. "I Want to Break Free"
21. "Another One Bites the Dust"
22. "Radio Ga Ga"
23. "The Show Must Go On" (played at every show including an excerpt played acoustically instead of normal version on 11 July before "Love of My Life")
24. "Crazy Little Thing Called Love"
25. "Bohemian Rhapsody"
  Encore
26. "Tie Your Mother Down"
27. "We Will Rock You"
28. "We Are the Champions"
29. "God Save the Queen" (tape)

== Tour dates ==
Date	City	Country	Venue	Tickets sold/available	Box office
Europe
30 June 2012	Kyiv	Ukraine	Maidan Nezalezhnosti	— (Note: The 30 June 2012 concert in Kyiv was part of "Your Life is Not a Game. Let's Stop AIDS Together!".)	
3 July 2012	Moscow	Russia	Olimpiyskiy	—N/a	—N/a
7 July 2012	Wrocław	Poland	Stadion Miejski	— (Note: The 7 July 2012 concert in Wrocław was part of "Rock In Wrocław!".)	
11 July 2012	London	England	Hammersmith Apollo	—N/a	—N/a
12 July 2012	London	England	Hammersmith Apollo	—N/a	—N/a
14 July 2012	London	England	Hammersmith Apollo	—N/a	—N/a

=== Cancellations and rescheduled shows ===
7 July 2012	Stevenage	Sonisphere Festival	Cancelled.
30 June 2012	Moscow	Olimpiyskiy	Rescheduled to 3 July 2012.

== Personnel ==
- Brian May – electric and acoustic guitars, vocals
- Roger Taylor – drums, percussion, vocals
- Adam Lambert – lead vocals
- Freddie Mercury – lead vocals (pre-recorded)

Additional musicians

- Spike Edney – keyboards, backing vocals
- Neil Fairclough – bass guitar, backing vocals
- Rufus Tiger Taylor – percussion, additional drums, backing vocals
