= Queen + Adam Lambert =

British-American musical collaboration

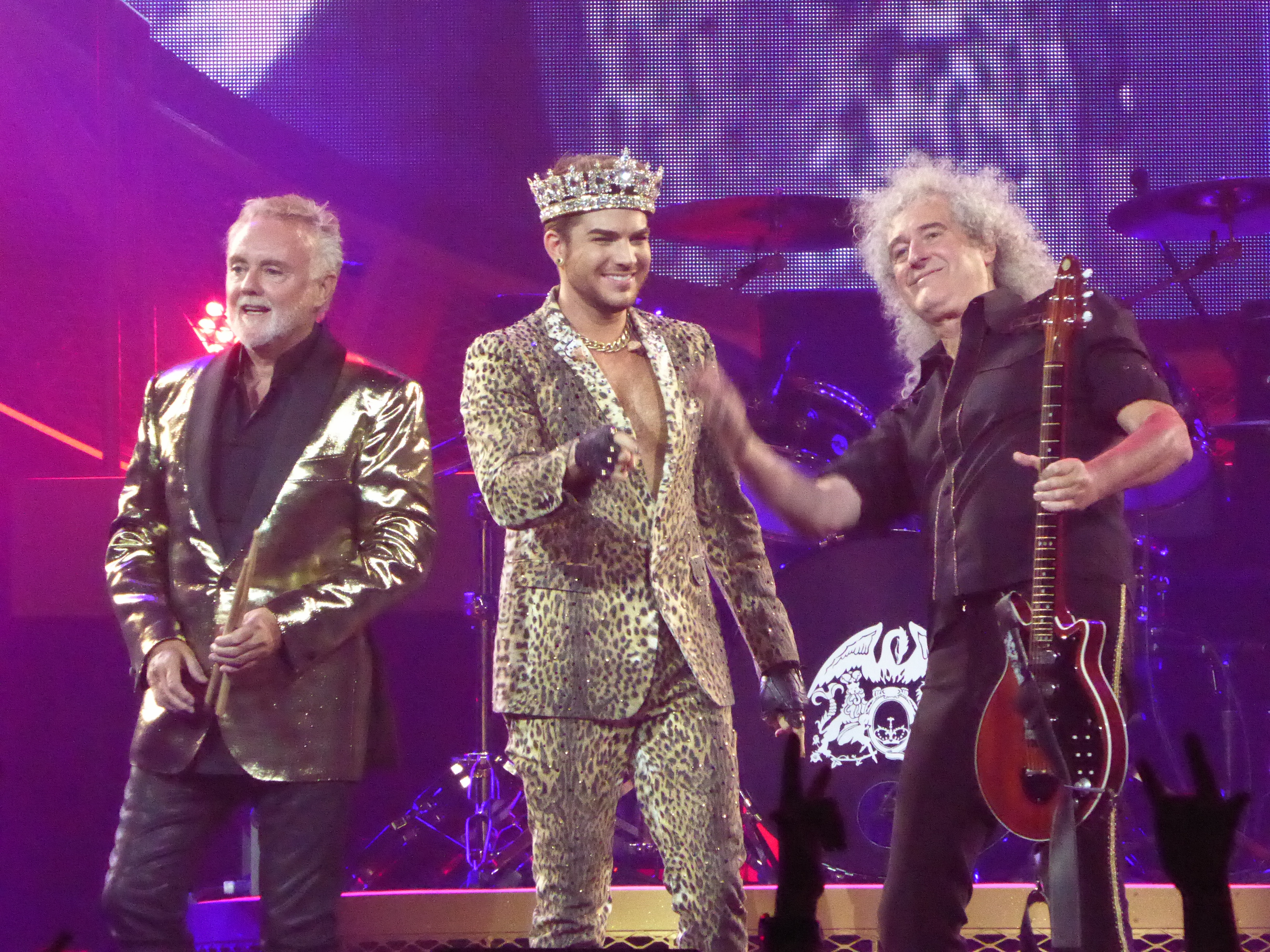
- Queen + Adam Lambert in July 2014, performing at SAP Center in San Jose, from left to right: Roger Taylor, Adam Lambert, Brian May

Background information
- Also known as: Q+AL; QAL
- Origin: United Kingdom; United States
- Genre: Rock
- Years active: 2011–Present
- Labels: Virgin EMI; EMI; Hollywood
- Spinoff of: Queen
- Members: Brian May; Roger Taylor; Adam Lambert

Queen + Adam Lambert is a collaboration between the remaining active members of the British rock band Queen (guitarist Brian May and drummer Roger Taylor) and American pop singer Adam Lambert. Like the previous Queen + Paul Rodgers collaboration, it was made clear that Lambert would not be replacing late Queen frontman Freddie Mercury, but rather that he would be featured with the band's active members. Longtime Queen bassist John Deacon declined to participate after having retired in 1997. This is the first long-term collaboration of Queen after the project with Rodgers ended in 2009.

The Queen + Adam Lambert collaboration originated when May and Taylor appeared on American Idol in 2009, when Lambert was a contestant. They began performing occasionally in 2011, conducted a short European tour in 2012, and in 2014 announced a world tour, the Queen + Adam Lambert Tour 2014–2015 with international dates in North America, Australia, New Zealand, Asia, Europe and South America. In the summer of 2016, the group performed several dates as part of a festival tour in Europe and several dates in Asia. The next year, the group announced a second worldwide tour scheduled for 2017 and 2018. After the success of the film Bohemian Rhapsody (2018), which starred Lambert, they announced their third worldwide tour called The Rhapsody Tour. This tour took the band back to North America in 2019, and to South Korea, Japan, New Zealand and Australia, playing stadiums, in early 2020. Further European dates (including 10 shows at The O2 Arena in London) were scheduled for the summer of 2020. These shows were then postponed until Summer 2022, due to the COVID-19 pandemic and lockdowns. In the fall of 2023 the band went back to North America for 23 dates. In February 2024, the band performed five shows in Japan.

Long-time Queen touring keyboardist Spike Edney, bassist Neil Fairclough and percussionist Tyler Warren join May, Taylor and Lambert as back-up musicians at their live shows. Although there are no immediate plans to release a studio album with this line-up, May and Taylor have stated that there is a possibility of the group recording their own, original material.

== Origin ==
Queen and Lambert first performed together in 2009 when Queen members Brian May and Roger Taylor appeared as guests on the eighth season of American Idol on which Lambert was a contestant. On the show, Lambert and the eventual winner Kris Allen performed "We Are the Champions" together with the band. Soon after the finale, May indicated to Rolling Stone that he was considering Lambert as a frontman for Queen. May later revealed that he became interested in Lambert as a replacement for Paul Rodgers after watching a video of Lambert's audition for American Idol where he performed "Bohemian Rhapsody".

In November 2011, Lambert joined Queen for a performance at the MTV Europe Awards in Belfast where Queen received a Global Icon Award. It was then reported in December 2011 that Taylor and May had begun discussions with Lambert for him to front Queen in concert. On 30 June 2012, Queen + Adam Lambert played their first full concert at Kyiv's Independence Square for a joint show with Elton John in aid of the Elena Pinchuk ANTIAIDS Foundation.

== Tours ==
After their first performance in Kyiv in 2012, a Queen + Adam Lambert mini-tour followed with dates in Moscow, Wrocław, and London. In September 2013, they appeared as a headliner at the iHeartRadio Music Festival in Las Vegas. In March 2014, they announced a 19-date Queen + Adam Lambert North American tour in the summer of 2014, which was then extended to 24 dates. In May 2014, tour dates in Australia were also announced, followed by New Zealand. The band also performed in South Korea and Japan. The tour was then extended to 2015 with dates in Europe and the UK as well as South America.

Queen + Adam Lambert 2016 Summer Festival Tour started on 20 May 2016 in Lisbon, Portugal and ended on 30 September 2016 in Bangkok, Thailand.

On 12 September 2016, Queen + Adam Lambert performed at Tel Aviv's Yarkon Park as part of their summer Festival Tour.

On 26 January 2017, a 26-date concert tour through North America was announced. The tour, which includes four dates in Canada, started on 23 June 2017 in Phoenix, Arizona and ended on 5 August 2017 in Houston, Texas. In April 2017, it was announced that the tour would be expanded to include 26 dates in Europe. Two months later, it was announced that the group would perform in New Zealand and Australia in February and March 2018. In February 2018, a second European leg was announced.

On 3 December 2018, Queen + Adam Lambert announced a North American tour taking place from July to August 2019, called The Rhapsody Tour. On 7 April 2019 Queen + Adam Lambert announced they are bringing The Rhapsody Tour to Australia for 6 Stadium shows in February 2020 and on 8 April 2019 they announced 3 more shows in New Zealand. On 17 April 2019, four tour dates were announced for Japan in January 2020; Tokyo, Osaka and Nagoya. On 31 March 2020, Queen + Adam Lambert confirmed that their touring dates for their final leg in Europe planned for the year were postponed two times until 2022 because of the global COVID-19 pandemic.

During the COVID-19 pandemic, May, Taylor and Lambert released "You Are the Champions" on 1 May 2020, with proceeds going to the COVID-19 Solidarity Response Fund. On 2 October 2020, Queen + Adam Lambert released a live album called Live Around the World.

== Appearances ==
Queen + Adam Lambert have appeared on a number of television shows. On 30 November 2014 they performed "Somebody to Love" with the X Factor contestants joining in the final chorus. The band performed two songs on the Christmas special of the Helene Fischer Show on German television. One of them was "I Want It All" and the other was "Who Wants to Live Forever" which was a duet between Lambert and Helene Fischer.

The band performed a special concert, Queen & Adam Lambert Rock Big Ben Live, which was broadcast live on BBC One on New Year's Eve 2014 and into New Year's Day 2015. The concert was performed in the shadow of Big Ben in Central Hall Westminster, and the show paused for the chimes of the Big Ben in the New Year countdown and the firework display in London. In February 2017, the band appeared on The Late Late Show with James Corden where Corden and Lambert have a sing-off to determine who the better Queen frontman would be. In June 2017, they also made an appearance for Jimmy Kimmel Live!, where they performed multiple songs during a live concert sponsored by Mercedes-Benz.

Queen + Adam Lambert announced a 10-date residency at Park Theater in Las Vegas in September 2018. They also performed at the 91st Academy Awards on 24 February 2019 to celebrate Bohemian Rhapsody. They then closed out Global Citizen Festival 2019 on 28 September.

On 16 February 2020 they appeared at Fire Fight Australia, a 10-hour charity concert in Sydney following the 2019–20 Australian bushfire season, where they performed the same set list that Queen performed at Live Aid in 1985. Afterwards, Brian May told fans on social media "I don't think I've felt quite like that since Live Aid."

The band was the opening act for the Platinum Party at the Palace, a concert in front of Buckingham Palace, London, in celebration of the Platinum Jubilee of Elizabeth II, with a three song set.

== Personnel ==
2011–2017	2017-Present
Brian May – guitar, backing and lead vocals; Roger Taylor – drums, percussion, backing and lead vocals; Adam Lambert – lead vocals; Spike Edney – keyboards, backing vocals; Neil Fairclough – bass guitar, backing vocals; Rufus Tiger Taylor – percussion, additional drums, backing vocals	Brian May – guitar, backing and lead vocals; Roger Taylor – drums, percussion, backing and lead vocals; Adam Lambert – lead vocals; Spike Edney – keyboards, backing vocals; Neil Fairclough – bass guitar, backing vocals; Tyler Warren – percussion, additional drums, backing vocals

== Discography ==
=== Live albums ===
Title	Album details	Peak chart positions										Certifications
Title	Album details	UK	US	AUS	AUT	BEL (FL)	GER	JPN	NLD	NZ	SWI	Certifications
Live in Japan	Released: 20 December 2016; Label: Ward Records; Formats: CD, DVD	—	—	—	—	—	—	—	—	—	—	
Live Around the World	Released: 2 October 2020; Label: EMI, Hollywood (US/Canada); Formats: CD, DVD, Blu-ray, vinyl, download	1	56	1	6	14	5	10	6	4	5	BPI: Silver
"—" denotes a recording that did not chart or was not released in that territory.

=== Singles ===
Title	Year	
Title	Year	UK
"You Are the Champions"	2020	95

=== As featured artist ===
- "Hammer to Fall" – Artists Unite for Fire Fight: Concert for National Bushfire Relief (2020)
