= You're My Best Friend =

- Yugoslavian single picture sleeve

Single by Queen

from the album A Night at the Opera
- B-side: "'39"
- Released: 18 June 1976 (UK)
- Recorded: 1975
- Genre: Rock; pop; pop rock
- Length: 2:52
- Label: Elektra (US); EMI (UK)
- Songwriter: John Deacon
- Producers: Roy Thomas Baker; Queen

Queen singles chronology
"Bohemian Rhapsody" (1975)	"You're My Best Friend" (1976)	"Somebody to Love" (1976)

Music video
- "You're My Best Friend" on YouTube

"You're My Best Friend" is a song by the British rock band Queen, written by the band's bass player, John Deacon, who wrote it for and about his wife. It was first included on the 1975 album A Night at the Opera, and later released as a single. The ballad also appeared on the Live Killers (1979) live album, and on the compilation albums Greatest Hits (1981), Absolute Greatest (2009) and Queen Forever (2014).

The song reached number seven in the UK Singles Chart and number 16 on the US Billboard Hot 100. It is certified platinum by the RIAA in the US with over one million copies sold. The song has since featured in television, film, and other media, such as The Simpsons and Family Guy.

== History ==
Deacon wrote the song for his wife, Veronica Tetzlaff. In this song, he plays a Wurlitzer electric piano in addition to his bass guitar work. The characteristic "bark" of the Wurlitzer's bass notes plays a prominent role in the song. During live performances, Freddie Mercury would play a grand piano, while Deacon played the bass guitar as in the original recording. The song would be performed live by the band from the Summer Gigs 1976 Tour up to the end of the North American leg of The Game Tour in 1980. It was then dropped from the rest of the tour, and would not be played live again until after the death of Mercury.

The song was used in several TV shows and films such as Hot in Cleveland, Will & Grace, EastEnders, My Name is Earl, The King of Queens, Good Omens, The Break-Up, the end credits of I Now Pronounce You Chuck and Larry, The Simpsons, Shaun of the Dead, Peter's Friends, The Secret Life of Pets, and the Family Guy episode "Farmer Guy".

== Music video ==
The music video, directed by Bruce Gowers, shows the band in a huge ballroom surrounded by over one thousand candles, including a huge chandelier hung from the ceiling. The video was filmed in April 1976 at Elstree Studios, near London. Additionally, Deacon is seen playing a grand piano rather than the Wurlitzer he used on the recording.

== Composition ==
Well, Freddie didn't like the electric piano, so I took it home and I started to learn on the electric piano and basically that's the song that came out you know when I was learning to play piano. It was written on that instrument and it sounds best on that. You know, often on the instrument that you wrote the song on.

— John Deacon, 24 December 1977, BBC Radio 1

I refused to play the damn thing [the electric piano]. It's tinny and horrible and I don't like them. Why play those things when you've got a lovely superb grand piano? No, I think, basically what he [John] is trying to say is it was the desired effect.

— Freddie Mercury, 24 December 1977, BBC Radio 1

The album A Night at the Opera features songs of numerous styles, including this three-minute rock, pop, and pop rock song. Very unusual for the genre, there is no section appearing more than twice; characteristic of many Queen songs, as affirmed by Brian May. On the other hand, in terms of phrases and measures, there are numerous repetitions or variants. The form is cyclic and very similar to that of "Spread Your Wings" (1977). Another similarity between the two songs is the lack of (real) modulation. The arrangement features 3 and 4-part vocal and guitar harmonies, bass (melodic approach), drums, and electric piano. This is Deacon's second recorded song and the first one released on single, some six months after the album-release. Mercury hits two sustained C_{5}s in the lead vocal track.

== Reception ==
Cash Box said that "the harmonies are smoothly designed to accentuate the hook of the chorus" and that "the beat is really good, on the edge of bubblegum, but still classy." Record World said it "stands to be every bit the enormous hit ['Bohemian Rhapsody'] was," even though it does not break new ground the way "Bohemian Rhapsody" did. Classic Rock History critic Millie Zeiler rated it John Deacon's best Queen song.

== Personnel ==
Information is taken from the Queen Songs website

- Freddie Mercury – lead and backing vocals
- Brian May – guitars, backing vocals
- Roger Taylor – drums, backing vocals
- John Deacon – Wurlitzer electronic piano, bass guitar

== Charts ==
=== Weekly charts ===
Chart (1976)	Peak position
Belgium (Ultratop 50 Flanders)	23
Belgium (Ultratop 50 Wallonia)	27
Canada Top Singles (RPM)	2
Finland (Suomen Virallinen)	27
Ireland (IRMA)	3
Netherlands (Dutch Top 40)	9
Netherlands (Single Top 100)	6
UK (OCC)	7
US Billboard Hot 100	16
United States (Cash Box)	9

Chart (2018)	Peak position
US Hot Rock & Alternative Songs (Billboard)	24

=== Year-end charts ===
Chart (1976)	Position
Canada	44
US	83

== Certification ==
Region	Certification	Certified units/sales
New Zealand (RMNZ)	2× Platinum	60,000^{‡}
United Kingdom (BPI)	Platinum	600,000^{‡}
United States (RIAA)	Platinum	1,000,000^{‡}
^{‡} Sales+streaming figures based on certification alone.
