= A Day at the Races (album) =

1976 studio album by Queen

Studio album by Queen
- Released: 10 December 1976
- Recorded: 12 July – 24 August 1976 (initial sessions); 5 September – 19 November 1976 (final sessions)
- Studios: The Manor (Oxfordshire); Sarm East (London); Wessex Sound (London); Advision (London)
- Genres: Hard rock; symphonic rock; glam rock
- Length: 44:24
- Labels: EMI; Elektra
- Producer: Queen

Queen chronology
A Night at the Opera (1975)	A Day at the Races (1976)	News of the World (1977)

Singles from A Day at the Races
- 1. "Somebody to Love" Released: 12 November 1976; 2. "Tie Your Mother Down" Released: 4 March 1977; 3. "Teo Torriatte (Let Us Cling Together)" Released: 25 March 1977 (Japan); 4. "Good Old-Fashioned Lover Boy" Released: 20 May 1977 (Note: Was not released as a standalone single; charted as lead track of Queen's First E.P., along with "Death on Two Legs (Dedicated to...)", "Tenement Funster" and "White Queen (As It Began)."); 5. "Long Away" Released: 7 June 1977

A Day at the Races is the fifth studio album by the British rock band Queen, released on 10 December 1976 by EMI Records in the United Kingdom and by Elektra Records in the United States. Recorded at The Manor, Sarm East, and Wessex Sound Studios in England, it was the band's first completely self-produced album, and the first completed without the involvement of producer Roy Thomas Baker; engineering duties were handled by Mike Stone. It serves as a companion to Queen's previous album, A Night at the Opera, with both taking their names from Marx Brothers films and having similar packaging and eclectic musical themes.

The album reached the top of the charts in the UK, Japan, and the Netherlands. It reached number five on the US Billboard Top LPs & Tape chart and was Queen's third album to ship gold in the US, subsequently reaching platinum status in the country. In 2006, a listener poll conducted by BBC Radio 2 saw A Day at the Races voted the 67th greatest album of all time.

== Background ==
On 25 April 1976, the band settled back in London after a four-leg, six-month, and exhaustive tour of their highly successful album A Night at the Opera, recorded during the oppressive summer of 1975; the band decided to take a two-month hiatus. They only occasionally did business-related activities (such as filming the promotional video for "You're My Best Friend" in late April). During June, the band were beginning to plan out the recording sessions for the album, visiting recording studios around Greater London to determine where they would produce the album. On 15 June, Roger Taylor and John Deacon visited Sweet Silence Studios in Denmark. The studio was completed only two months prior.

After Taylor and Deacon returned from Denmark, rehearsals began on 17 June at Ridge Farm Studio, where the band had rehearsed for their previous album in July 1975. Due to equipment issues during the first week, the band hired Pete Cornish on 25 June to assist in equipment maintenance. Cornish and the band had previous involvement, as his company had helped repair and construct new equipment for the band in January 1972.

== Recording and production ==
Queen entered The Manor in Oxfordshire on 12 July to commence work on A Day at the Races. Absent was Roy Thomas Baker, who had helped the band produce their last four albums. The four-album contract he had signed with the band in 1972 had expired after the release of the band's fourth album, and the band had decided to record the album by themselves, with the assistance of engineers Mike Stone and Gary Langan.

By late July, the band had finished 6 songs: "Good Old-Fashioned Lover Boy", "The Millionaire Waltz", "You Take My Breath Away", "White Man" (then titled "Simple Man"), "Drowse", and a shorter version of "Somebody to Love". As August entered, the band worked on the remaining songs of the album, and finished a longer version of "Somebody to Love". Work was relaxed, and the band sometimes played billiards or card games during productive days. During a game of billiards on 8 August, between Roger and one of the band's roadies, Crystal Taylor, Roger asked him to be his personal roadie, to which Crystal assented.

The band had booked to play two concerts on 20 and 21 August at the Playhouse Theatre in Edinburgh, and the band said to Melody Maker they would be debuting new material during those concerts. The band eventually cancelled those concerts since the songs they wanted to debut weren't finished, and instead did a mini-tour of the country during September. The band had at least the backing tracks of "Tie Your Mother Down" (likely the overdubbed product), "Long Away", "You and I", and "Teo Torriatte (Let Us Cling Together)" recorded by 24 August, including the previously recorded material, before the band began to rehearse for their summer mini-tour the following day.

The summer tour started in Edinburgh, where "Tie Your Mother Down", and "You Take My Breath Away" were debuted to the audience. During the summer tour, the band moved production into Sarm East Studios and worked there sporadically in between concerts (in approximately nine sessions) between 5 and 16 September to do overdubs. During this period predominantly guitar overdubs were added to "The Millionaire Waltz". Most of the songs that were initially recorded in July were finished off during this time, and the rest of the songs recorded in August that weren't performed live were put off until work on the album properly resumed.

Recording sessions resumed on 20 September at Sarm, with more overdubs and rough mixing of some of the finished tracks. On 23 September, the band published a thank you message in the music press to their fans regarding their warm response to their concert at Hyde Park on 18 September (the final date of the summer tour). "Tie Your Mother Down" was mostly mixed on 26 September, and a mix of "Long Away" was worked on during the same day. The band completed a preliminary mix of "Somebody to Love" on 29 September.

The band turned their attention to the lead single during mid-October, which was scheduled to be released in three weeks. They mixed the single from 18 to 24 October. "Somebody to Love", which was recorded in two separate parts, was mixed first. Parts 1 and 2 were fused together and completed on 22 October. They then turned their attention to "White Man", which was mostly mixed on 23 October and finished on 24 October. The band then moved to Wessex Sound Studios on 25 October to begin mixing the rest of the album. On 26 October, "Long Away" and "Good Old-Fashioned Lover Boy" were mixed. On 28 October, while mixing tracks off of the album, the band were taken into a different room at Wessex to partake in a photoshoot. The photos from this shoot ended up on the inner sleeve of the album.

Pressure to complete the album was becoming more apparent, as the due date was coming close. After a day off at the end of the month, work immediately resumed. On 1 November, "You Take My Breath Away" was mixed, and finished off the following day. A tape of the still unfinished album was created on 5 November, with a different track-list and a lot of chatter and studio noise clearly not mixed out of some songs yet. "Teo Torriatte" wasn't even completed at this point, with some crucial overdubs still to be done. On 9 November, "Long Away", "Drowse", and "Tie Your Mother Down" were fully mixed at Wessex. These songs had been worked on during the previous three days.

On 16 November, "The Millionaire Waltz" and "You and I" were mixed at Wessex. On 17 and 18 November, "Teo Torriatte" was mixed at Wessex, and the album was mastered on 19 November, officially completing it. A pressing of the album was played to fans and music press at Advision Studios on 26 November. The album took approximately 16 weeks in total to record, the longest time the band had spent recording an album yet.

== Songs ==
=== Side one ===
==== "Tie Your Mother Down" ====
"Tie Your Mother Down" was written by Brian May in Tenerife in early 1968, two years before the formation of Queen. At the time, he was working on his PhD in Astronomy. He wrote the song on Spanish guitar and thought he'd change the title and chorus later on, but when he brought it to the band for inclusion on this album, Freddie Mercury liked the original and it was kept the way it was written.

The song is preceded by an instrumental introduction consisting of a multi-tracked guitar part, reminiscent of the song "White Man", followed by a Shepard tone figure, which is reprised at the end of "Teo Torriatte" to create a "circle" in the album. The ascending scale of the second part of the intro was created by reversing a recording of a descending scale played on a harmonium.

The main bulk of the song can be described as heavy blues rock, featuring aggressive vocals by lead singer Mercury, as well as a slide guitar solo by May, who provided most of the backing vocals.

A music video was made for the song, directed by Bruce Gowers and based on a performance clip shot at Nassau Coliseum in Long Island, New York, in February 1977 during the band's US arena headlining tour. After its release in 1976, the song was played by Queen on every subsequent tour.

==== "You Take My Breath Away" ====
"You Take My Breath Away" was written by Mercury and based on the harmonic minor scale. He performed it by himself at the summer gigs in 1976 before recording it, and all of the vocals in the version of the song on the album were performed by him, as was the piano part.

Unusually for Queen, Mercury's lead vocals were triple-tracked to achieve "a solo vocal that could hold its own against the chorus."

There is a vocal interlude between this song and the next in which a wash of vocals consisting of a loop of a multi-tracked Mercury repeating the words "take my breath" steadily increases in volume until it resolves into the echoed phrase "take my breath away" and fades out.

==== "Long Away" ====
"Long Away" was composed and sung by May. He used a Burns Double Six 12-string electric guitar for the rhythm parts, instead of his Red Special; he had wanted to use a Rickenbacker because he admired John Lennon, but did not get along well with the thin neck of the instrument. The song was released as a single in the US, Canada, and New Zealand, but failed to chart anywhere.

==== "The Millionaire Waltz" ====
"The Millionaire Waltz" was written by Mercury about John Reid (Queen and Elton John's manager at the time). Like "Bohemian Rhapsody", it is a multi-key and multi-metre song and features abrupt arrangement changes and May doing multi-tracked guitar choirs. Partway through, this 3/4 waltz is interrupted by a short 12/8 hard rock segment. It is a noteworthy example of John Deacon's "lead bass" playing, which can be heard quite prominently early in the song, when only Deacon and Mercury are playing (bass guitar and piano/vocals, respectively).

==== "You and I" ====
"You and I" is the only song on the album written by Deacon. It is in the key of D major, is mainly piano-driven, and features Deacon on acoustic guitar. The song was featured as the B-side for "Tie Your Mother Down", but was never played live.

=== Side two ===
==== "Somebody to Love" ====
"Somebody to Love" was written by Mercury. The song was inspired by gospel music, especially that of Aretha Franklin, and Mercury, May and Taylor all multi-tracked their voices to achieve the impression of a 100-voice gospel choir. Mercury's vocal part features a wide range of notes, going from an A♭2 (in the last choral verse) to a falsetto A♭5 (at the peak of his melisma on "ooh" over the choir break). Staying true to Queen's guitar-driven style, the track was also filled with intricate harmony parts and a solo by May.

The song was the biggest hit single from the album. It went to number two on the UK charts (kept from the number one spot by "Under the Moon of Love" by Showaddywaddy) and number 13 on the US singles chart.

==== "White Man" ====
"White Man" was written by May about the suffering of Native Americans at the hands of European immigrants during the colonial period, taking the viewpoint of native peoples. It is one of Queen's heaviest works, thematically and musically.

==== "Good Old-Fashioned Lover Boy" ====
"Good Old-Fashioned Lover Boy" was written by Mercury. It starts with a piano and vocal introduction by Mercury, and the bass and drums join in at the start of the chorus. Part of the bridge of the song is sung by engineer Mike Stone (the lines: "Hey boy where'd you get it from? Hey boy where did you go?"). The recording is enhanced by multi-tracked vocals, as well as May's guitar choirs.

The song was performed live on Top of the Pops in June 1977, with Taylor singing Stone's part. Most of the track was a concert staple on the band's A Day at the Races Tour and News of the World Tour.

==== "Drowse" ====
"Drowse" is the only song on the album written by Roger Taylor, who, in addition to playing the drums, did all of the vocals and played rhythm guitar; May played the slide guitar. Like "I'm In Love With My Car", Taylor's song on the previous album, "Drowse" is in 6/8.

The song has never been performed live, but it was rehearsed by Queen + Adam Lambert before their Rock Big Ben Live concert. It made an appearance on both the standard and deluxe editions of Queen Forever.

==== "Teo Torriatte (Let Us Cling Together)" ====
"Teo Torriatte (Let Us Cling Together)" was May's tribute to the band's Japanese fans, and was performed live in Tokyo during the Jazz Tour in 1979, and again when the band visited Japan during The Game and Hot Space tours in 1981 and 1982, respectively. It has two choruses sung in Japanese, making it one of only three Queen songs in which an entire verse or chorus is sung in a language other than English (the others being "Mustapha", from Jazz and "Las Palabras de Amor" from Hot Space). The song features a piano, a plastic piano, and a harmonium, all of which are played by May.

The harmonium melody that ends the song is a longer reprise of the second part of the introduction to "Tie Your Mother Down", the first track on the album. May described it as "a never-ending staircase", otherwise commonly known, especially in music, as a Shepard tone.

== Singles ==
In the UK, the first track from the album to be released as a single was "Somebody to Love", on 12 November 1976 (EMI 2565); it reached number two. "Tie Your Mother Down" followed on 4 March 1977 (EMI 2593), reaching number 31, and "Good Old-Fashioned Lover Boy" on 20 May 1977, reaching number 17.

In the US, "Somebody to Love" was released on 10 December 1976 (Elektra E45362) and reached number 13. It was followed by "Tie Your Mother Down" (Elektra E45385) in March 1977, which reached number 49. Both of these were released in Japan, as was "Teo Torriatte", which was not released as a single in any other territory.

== Reception and legacy ==
Professional ratings
Review scores
Source	Rating
AllMusic	3.5/5 stars
Chicago Tribune	3/4 stars
Encyclopedia of Popular Music	3/5 stars
MusicHound Rock	4.5/5 stars
Pitchfork	6.6/10
PopMatters	7/10
Q	3/5 stars
Rolling Stone	2/5 stars
The Rolling Stone Album Guide	2/5 stars
Uncut	3/5 stars

The album garnered mixed reviews from contemporary critics. The Washington Post described it as "a judicious blend of heavy metal rockers and classically influenced, almost operatic, torch songs." The Winnipeg Free Press was also appreciative, writing: "Races is a reconfirmation of Queen's position as the best of the third wave of English rock groups." Circus gave the album a mixed review, writing: "With A Day at the Races, they've deserted art-rock entirely. They're silly now. And wondrously shameless."

However, retrospective reviews have been positive and more appreciative of the album. Greg Kot, reviewing for Chicago Tribune gave the album a very positive rating that matched the exact rating of the previous album, and commented how he considers this album as a part of the band's artistic peak alongside A Night At The Opera.

In a retrospective review, AllMusic editor Stephen Thomas Erlewine cited "Tie Your Mother Down" and "Somebody to Love", along with ballad "You Take My Breath Away", as the best tracks on the album, and said the album marked a point where Queen "entered a new phase, where they're globe-conquering titans instead of underdogs on the make". Q magazine wrote that "the breadth of its ambition remains ever impressive, as do tracks such as May's stomping 'Tie Your Mother Down' and Mercury's baroque one-two, 'Somebody to Love' and 'Good Old-Fashioned Lover Boy'." Ben Sisario, writing in The Rolling Stone Album Guide (2004), found the album "a little too predictable" and called it "a quickie sequel to Opera." Similarly, AJ Ramirez, writing for PopMatters, described the album as "a comparative comedown" and "a good but not stupendous record", while acknowledging the band were "now firmly in command of the mechanics of pop songcraft", which had yielded them more singles than any previous album.

In 2006, a listener poll conducted by BBC Radio 2 saw A Day at the Races voted the 67th greatest album of all time. The same year, in a worldwide Guinness and NME poll to find the "Greatest 100 Albums of All Time", the album was voted number 87. It was also featured in Classic Rock and Metal Hammer's "The 200 Greatest Albums of the 70s", being listed as one of the 20 greatest albums of 1976. Out ranked it No. 20 of 100 in a poll of "more than 100 actors, comedians, musicians, writers, critics, performance artists, label reps, and DJs, asking each to list the 10 albums that left the most indelible impressions on their lives." In the 1987 edition of The World Critics List, the BBC's Peter Powell ranked A Day at the Races the 6th greatest album of all time, and Jim DeRogatis of the Chicago Sun-Times included the record in his "The Great Albums" in 2006.

== Reissues ==
The album was reissued as part of the Hollywood Records remasters in 1991. It was also reissued by Parlophone in various European countries in 1993, remastered and sometimes with an altered track listing and timings (due to the placement of the beginning of "Tie Your Mother Down" in its own track, titled "Intro"). In 1996, Mobile Fidelity Sound Lab issued a remaster of the album in the United States on both CD (numbered UDCD 668) and vinyl (numbered MFSL-1-256).

On 8 November 2010, record company Universal Music announced a remastered and expanded reissue of the album set for release in May 2011. This was part of a new record deal between Queen and Universal Music, which marked the end of Queen's almost 40-year association with EMI Records. All of the band's albums were remastered and reissued by Universal in 2011.

== Track listing ==
=== Original release ===
All lead vocals by Freddie Mercury unless noted.

Side one
No.	Title	Writer(s)	Lead vocals	Length
1.	"Tie Your Mother Down"	Brian May		4:48
2.	"You Take My Breath Away"	Mercury		5:09
3.	"Long Away"	May	May	3:34
4.	"The Millionaire Waltz"	Mercury		4:54
5.	"You and I"	John Deacon		3:25

Side two
No.	Title	Writer(s)	Lead vocals	Length
6.	"Somebody to Love"	Mercury		4:56
7.	"White Man"	May		4:59
8.	"Good Old-Fashioned Lover Boy"	Mercury	Mercury with Mike Stone	2:54
9.	"Drowse"	Roger Taylor	Taylor	3:45
10.	"Teo Torriatte (Let Us Cling Together)"	May		5:54
Total length:				44:24

Bonus tracks (1991 Hollywood Records reissue)
No.	Title	Length
11.	"Tie Your Mother Down" (1991 bonus remix by Matt Wallace)	3:44
12.	"Somebody to Love" (1991 bonus remix by Randy Badazz)	5:00
Total length:		53:08

=== Universal Music reissue (2011) ===
Bonus EP
No.	Title	Length
1.	"Tie Your Mother Down" (backing track mix 2011)	3:49
2.	"Somebody to Love" (live at Milton Keynes Bowl, June 1982)	7:57
3.	"You Take My Breath Away" (Live at Hyde Park, September 1976)	3:07
4.	"Good Old-Fashioned Lover Boy" (Top of the Pops, July 1977 (mono))	2:53
5.	"Teo Torriatte (Let Us Cling Together)" (HD mix)	4:47
Total length:		22:33

=== iTunes deluxe edition (2011) ===
Bonus videos
No.	Title	Length
1.	"You Take My Breath Away" (live at Earls Court '77)
2.	"Tie Your Mother Down" (live at Milton Keynes '82)
3.	"Somebody to Love"

== Personnel ==
Information is based on Queen's Complete Works and on the album's liner notes.
Track numbering refers to CD and digital releases of the album.

Queen

- Freddie Mercury – lead vocals (1, 2, 4–8, 10), backing vocals (all except 9), gospel choir vocals (6), piano (2, 4–6, 8)
- Brian May – electric guitar (all tracks), slide guitar (1, 9), guitar orchestration (1, 4, 10), harmonium (1 – intro, 10), piano (10), backing vocals (1, 3–8, 10), gospel choir vocals (6), lead vocals (3), acoustic guitar (9)
- Roger Taylor – drums (all except 2), percussion (1–3, 8, 10), timpani (9), electric rhythm guitar (9), backing vocals (all except 2), gospel choir vocals (6), lead vocals (9)
- John Deacon – bass guitar (all tracks), acoustic guitar (5)

Additional personnel

- Mike Stone – additional vocals (8)

Production

- Queen – production
- Mike Stone – engineering
- David Costa – art direction

== Charts ==
=== Weekly charts ===
Chart (1976–1977)	Peak position
Australian Albums (Kent Music Report)	8
Austrian Albums (Ö3 Austria)	8
Canada Top Albums/CDs (RPM)	4
Dutch Albums (Album Top 100)	1
Finnish Albums (The Official Finnish Charts)	4
German Albums (Offizielle Top 100)	10
Japanese Albums (Oricon)	1
New Zealand Albums (RMNZ)	11
Norwegian Albums (VG-lista)	3
Swedish Albums (Sverigetopplistan)	8
UK Albums (Official Charts)	1
US Billboard 200	5

Chart (2019)	Peak position
Belgian Albums (Ultratop Wallonia)	154

Chart (2021)	Peak position
Polish Albums (ZPAV)	48

=== Year-end charts ===
Chart (1977)	Position
Australian Albums (Kent Music Report)	45
Canada Top Albums/CDs (RPM)	38
Japanese Albums (Oricon)	24
UK Albums (OCC)	45

== Certifications and sales ==
Region	Certification	Certified units/sales
Belgium (BRMA)	Gold	25,000^{*}
Canada (Music Canada)	Platinum	100,000^{^}
Germany (BVMI)	Gold	250,000^{^}
Italy (FIMI)	Gold	25,000^{‡}
Japan	—	135,000
Netherlands (NVPI)	Platinum	100,000^{^}
New Zealand (RMNZ)	Gold	7,500^{‡}
Poland (ZPAV)	Platinum	20,000^{*}
South Africa (RISA)	Gold	25,000^{*}
United Kingdom (BPI)	Gold	100,000^{^}
United States (RIAA)	Platinum	1,000,000^{^}
^{*} Sales figures based on certification alone.^{^} Shipments figures based on certification alone.^{‡} Sales+streaming figures based on certification alone.
