= Maybe It's Because I'm a Londoner =

1944 British song

- 1951 sheet music

Song
- Published: 1944
- Genre: Popular song
- Songwriter(s): Hubert Gregg

Maybe It's Because I'm a Londoner is a 1944 British song composed by Hubert Gregg. Gregg, a pre-war broadcaster for the BBC, was on leave during the Second World War when he wrote the work. It has been recorded by a number of artists including Bud Flanagan and David Jones.
