= Somebody to Love (Queen song) =

1976 single by Queen

- UK picture sleeve

Single by Queen

from the album A Day at the Races
- B-side: "White Man" (UK); "Long Away" (Poland)
- Released: 12 November 1976
- Recorded: 1976
- Genre: Glam rock; gospel
- Length: 4:56
- Label: EMI (UK); Elektra (US); Tonpress (Poland)
- Songwriter: Freddie Mercury
- Producer: Queen

Queen singles chronology
"You're My Best Friend" (1976)	"Somebody to Love" (1976)	"Tie Your Mother Down" (1977)

Music video
- "Somebody to Love" on YouTube

"Somebody to Love" is a song by the British rock band Queen, written by lead singer and pianist Freddie Mercury. It debuted on the band's 1976 album A Day at the Races and also appears on their 1981 compilation album Greatest Hits.

The song has similarities to Queen's earlier hit "Bohemian Rhapsody" with its complex harmonies and guitar solos; however, instead of mimicking an English choir, the band turned to a gospel choir. It reached No. 2 in the UK and No. 13 on the US Billboard Hot 100. The song demonstrated that "Queen could swing as hard as it could rock, by channeling the spirit of gospel music".

Written by Mercury at the piano, "Somebody to Love" is a soul-searching piece that questions life without love. Through voice layering techniques, Queen was able to create the soulful sound of a 100-voice choir from three singers: Freddie Mercury, Brian May, and Roger Taylor. Mercury's fascination and admiration for Aretha Franklin was a major influence for the creation of this song.

Queen played "Somebody to Love" live from 1977 to 1985, and a live performance of the song is featured on the albums Queen Rock Montreal and Queen on Fire – Live at the Bowl. In addition to these live performances, there were collaboration tributes to "Somebody to Love" after Mercury's death in 1991. The song was performed live on 20 April 1992 during the Freddie Mercury Tribute Concert, with George Michael on lead vocals.

== Composition and lyrics ==
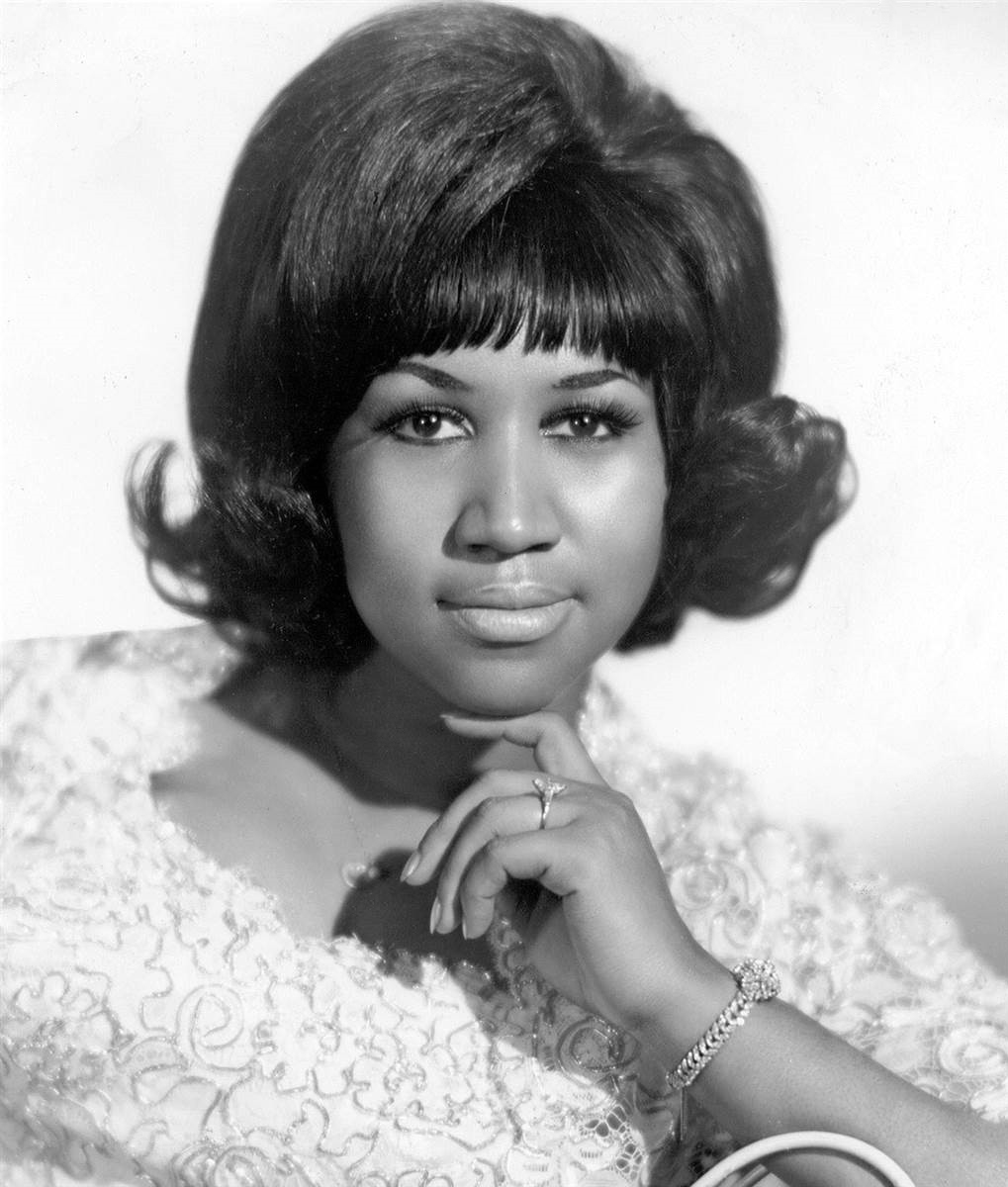
"Somebody to Love" was inspired by Aretha Franklin, Mercury's favourite singer and one of his biggest inspirations.

Like "Bohemian Rhapsody", the major hit from Queen's previous album A Night at the Opera (1975), "Somebody to Love" has a complex melody and deep layering of vocal tracks. But while "Bohemian Rhapsody" was based on English choir styles, "Somebody to Love" was based on a gospel choir arrangement, with Mercury, May and Taylor multitracking their voices to create the impression of a 100-voice choir. Written in the key of A♭ major, the glam rock and gospel song features dramatic intervallic contrasts, ranging from F2 to A♭5 in the harmonies and from E♭3 to C5 in full voice (and up to an A♭5 in falsetto) in Mercury's lead vocals.

The lyrics, especially combined with the gospel influence, create a song about faith, desperation and soul-searching; the singer questions both the lack of love experienced in his life, and the role and existence of God. This is reinforced by frequent use of word painting. The lyrics also speak to the feelings of desperation and isolation that accompany trying to find love as a queer man in an unaccepting and lonely world ("I just gotta get out of this prison cell. Someday I'm gonna be free."). Staying true to Queen's guitar-driven style, it was also filled with intricate harmonies and a notable guitar solo by May. The band have spoken of sections of the song which were recorded but never made it onto the final mix of the song, some of which have been leaked online.

"Somebody to Love" is Aretha Franklin-influenced. Freddie's very much into that. We tried to keep the track in a loose, gospel-type feel. I think it's the loosest track we've ever done.

— Roger Taylor

== Release ==
"Somebody to Love" went to No. 2 on the UK Singles Chart and No. 13 on the US Billboard Hot 100. A promotional video was made combining a staged recording session at Sarm Studios (where the A Day at the Races album was recorded) and film footage of the band's record-breaking performance at Hyde Park that September. Peter Hince, the head of Queen's road crew, recalled to Mojo magazine: "Aesthetically, you had to have all four around the microphone, but John (Deacon) didn't sing on the records. By his own admission, he didn't have the voice. He did sing on-stage but the crew always knew to keep the fader very low." The song was included on their first Greatest Hits, released in 1981.

== Critical reception ==
Billboard stated that the song grabs attention with gimmicks such as changes in volume and tempo and the use of classical music elements. Cash Box said that "sounding like the Harvard Chorale on the opening and backing up Freddie Mercury might be their idea of a logical progression from A Night at the Opera", and that "there's a grand finale, with handclapping and thundering percussion." Record World said that "the group continues to stretch the limitations of the commercial single" by incorporating "operatic overtures" along the lines of "Bohemian Rhapsody". Los Angeles Times critic Robert Hilburn said that "its gospel-tinged urgency maintain's the English band's knack for arrangements that are at once off-beat, yet well within the broad rock mainstream.

"Somebody To Love" was named one of The Rock and Roll Hall of Fame's 500 Songs that Shaped Rock and Roll.

== Live performances ==
The song was a staple of the A Day at the Races and News of the World tours in 1977–78. For the Jazz and Crazy tours, it was also played consistently. During the Game Tour, it was only performed early on, and then only rarely, being practically absent in the first three legs, but would return as a staple to the set by early March in South America. It was also played for South America Bites the Dust, Queen Rock Montreal, and most of the Hot Space Tour, being included in Live at the Bowl. Later during the Works Tour, a shortened version was played as a medley preceding "Killer Queen". A live version from the 1984/85 tour was recorded and filmed on the concert film, Final Live in Japan 1985.

When performed live, Mercury would often alter the melodies of the song, but would generally hit the sustained A♭4 notes throughout the song. The A♭4 at the peak of the building line "can anybody find me" on the studio version was not part of Mercury's original melody, but the other band members felt that it worked better than his. Live, Mercury sang his original take on this line.

This was also one of few tracks where Deacon sang backing vocals when performed live. His voice was clearly heard on bootlegs from the band's performance at Earls Court in June 1977 and at the Houston Summit in December 1977.

Even after Mercury's death in 1991, renditions of "Somebody to Love" have been performed live with the remaining band members, May and Taylor, and a number of different lead singers. At the Freddie Mercury Tribute Concert held at Wembley Stadium, the song was performed by George Michael. Michael's performance of "Somebody to Love" has been hailed as "one of the best performances of the tribute concert". The song was later re-released in 1993 as the lead track of an EP called Five Live, which reached No. 1 in the UK. This version is also available on Greatest Hits III, released in 1999.

The song was performed on the setlists of their Queen + Adam Lambert tours in 2012, 2014–2015 and 2016 featuring Adam Lambert and at the iHeartRadio Festival 2013 as Queen + Fun.

== Personnel ==
- Freddie Mercury – lead and backing vocals, piano
- Brian May – guitars, backing vocals
- Roger Taylor – drums, backing vocals
- John Deacon – bass

== Charts ==
=== Weekly charts ===
Chart (1976–1977)	Peak position
Australia (Kent Music Report)	15
Belgium (Ultratop 50 Flanders)	2
Belgium (Ultratop 50 Wallonia)	5
Canada Top Singles (RPM)	5
Denmark (Tracklisten)	19
Finland (Suomen Virallinen)	21
Ireland (IRMA)	6
Italy (Musica e Dischi)	10
Netherlands (Dutch Top 40)	1
Netherlands (Single Top 100)	1
South Africa (Springbok)	7
UK Singles (Official Charts)	2
US Billboard Hot 100	13
US Cash Box Top 100	9
West Germany (GfK)	21

Chart (2018–2019)	Peak position
Australia (ARIA)	47
Canada (Hot Canadian Digital Songs)	20
France (SNEP)	154
Hungary (Single Top 40)	25
Italy (FIMI)	58
Japan Hot 100 (Billboard)	63
Portugal (AFP)	75
Spain (Promusicae)	78
US Hot Rock & Alternative Songs (Billboard)	5

=== Year-end charts ===
Chart (1977)	Position
Australia (Kent Music Report)	100
Belgium (Ultratop 50 Flanders)	27
Canada Top Singles (RPM)	63
Netherlands (Dutch Top 40)	38
Netherlands (Single Top 100)	46
US Billboard Hot 100	88

Chart (2019)	Position
US Hot Rock Songs (Billboard)	20

== Certifications ==
Region	Certification	Certified units/sales
Brazil (Pro-Música Brasil)	Gold	30,000^{‡}
Denmark (IFPI Danmark)	Platinum	90,000^{‡}
Germany (BVMI)	Gold	250,000^{‡}
Italy (FIMI)	2× Platinum	200,000^{‡}
New Zealand (RMNZ)	3× Platinum	90,000^{‡}
Spain (Promusicae)	Platinum	60,000^{‡}
United Kingdom (BPI) 2011 release	2× Platinum	1,200,000^{‡}
United States (RIAA)	5× Platinum	5,000,000^{‡}
^{‡} Sales+streaming figures based on certification alone.

== Other versions ==
=== George Michael and Queen version ===
"Somebody to Love"

Single by George Michael and Queen

from the EP Five Live
- B-side: "Dear Friends"
- Released: 19 April 1993
- Recorded: 20 April 1992
- Venue: Wembley Stadium (London)
- Length: 5:17
- Label: Parlophone
- Songwriter: Freddie Mercury
- Producers: Queen; George Michael

George Michael singles chronology
"Too Funky" (1992)	"Somebody to Love" (1993)	"Killer" / "Papa Was a Rollin' Stone" (1993)

Music video
- "Somebody to Love" (live) on YouTube

English singer-songwriter George Michael performed "Somebody to Love" with Queen's remaining members at the Freddie Mercury Tribute Concert on 20 April 1992. It was included as the first track on the 1993 EP Five Live, credited to George Michael and Queen with Lisa Stansfield. As part of the EP, the cover reached No. 1 on the UK Singles Chart for three weeks.

==== Charts ====
===== Weekly charts =====
Chart (1993)	Peak position
Australia (ARIA)	19
Austria (Ö3 Austria Top 40)	15
Belgium (Ultratop 50 Flanders)	8
Canada Top Singles (RPM)	13
Canada Adult Contemporary (RPM)	11
Europe (Eurochart Hot 100)	29
Europe (European Hit Radio)	1
France (SNEP)	16
Germany (GfK)	21
Iceland (Íslenski Listinn Topp 40)	2
Ireland (IRMA)	1
Italy (Musica e dischi)	9
Netherlands (Dutch Top 40)	5
Netherlands (Single Top 100)	6
New Zealand (Recorded Music NZ)	8
UK Singles (Official Charts)	1
UK Airplay (Music Week)	7
US Billboard Hot 100	30
US Adult Contemporary (Billboard)	42
US Pop Airplay (Billboard)	15
US Cash Box Top 100	32

===== Year-end charts =====
Chart (1993)	Position
Belgium (Ultratop)	59
Canada Adult Contemporary (RPM)	88
Europe (European Hit Radio)	24
Iceland (Íslenski Listinn Topp 40)	51
Netherlands (Dutch Top 40)	47
Netherlands (Single Top 100)	68

==== Certifications ====
Region	Certification	Certified units/sales
United Kingdom (BPI)	Silver	200,000^{‡}
^{‡} Sales+streaming figures based on certification alone.

=== Troye Sivan version ===
"Somebody to Love"

Single by Troye Sivan
- Released: 2 November 2018
- Recorded: 2018
- Length: 2:25
- Songwriter: Freddie Mercury
- Producer: Leland

Troye Sivan singles chronology
"Revelation" (2018)	"Somebody to Love" (2018)	"I'm So Tired..." (2019)

In November 2018, Australian singer Troye Sivan released a version of the song. The song was released to coincide with the release of the film Bohemian Rhapsody. Universal Music Group released three tracks by different artists channeling their inner Freddie Mercury; this is the third and final installment, following Shawn Mendes' "Under Pressure" and 5 Seconds of Summer's "Killer Queen" released in October 2018. Similarly to the aforementioned tracks, proceeds from the single benefit the Mercury Phoenix Trust.

In a statement, Sivan said, "I'm so beyond honored to have been asked to cover 'Somebody to Love' by Queen, a masterful song by the most legendary band."

==== Reception ====
Queen's manager Jim Beach said Sivan's version "is both moving and totally original". Luke Schatz of Consequence of Sound said, "While Mercury's version soared with choir-like vocals and dramatic instrumentation, Sivan employs a more mellow, minimalist approach. Here, his calming voice is accompanied by little more than bass and keys."
