= Stone Cold Crazy =

1974 song by Queen

Song by Queen

from the album Sheer Heart Attack
- Released: 8 November 1974
- Recorded: July–September 1974
- Genre: Heavy metal; hard rock; thrash metal; speed metal
- Length: 2:16
- Label: EMI; Elektra
- Songwriters: Freddie Mercury; Brian May; Roger Taylor; John Deacon
- Producers: Roy Thomas Baker; Queen

Music video
- "Stone Cold Crazy" (live at the Rainbow) on YouTube

"Stone Cold Crazy" is a song written and performed by British rock band Queen for their 1974 album Sheer Heart Attack. It is a rare, early example of all four members sharing a writing credit, as the band did not formally credit themselves entirely until 1989's The Miracle. "Stone Cold Crazy" is included on the band's 1992 compilation album, Classic Queen and was released as a promo single in that year by Hollywood Records.

== Background ==
Stone Cold Crazy is one of the earliest original songs by the band, originally written by Freddie for one of his earlier bands, Wreckage. The song was performed frequently in the band's earliest days, but later dropped when they gained newer material. The original sound of the song, according to Brian May, was much more easygoing. However, as the song developed, the riff changed and the song became the version that appears on Sheer Heart Attack.

Although the song was not released as a single at the time, it was performed live at almost every Queen concert, as it made its debut on the Sheer Heart Attack tour in 1974, and was played through on almost every night of the News of the World tour in 1977 and 1978, although it was dropped for the UK dates of that tour. The song was revived in a condensed form on the Works tour in 1984.

== Sound ==
"Stone Cold Crazy" is known for its fast tempo and heavy distortion, thus being a precursor to speed metal. Music magazine Q described "Stone Cold Crazy" as "thrash metal before the term was invented", although this was not the first song in the style of "proto-thrash", with Deep Purple's "Hard Lovin' Man" predating it by four years. In 2009, it was named the 38th best hard rock song of all time by VH1.

DRUM! called it an "early blisteringly fast song", describing Taylor's performance as "straight-up punk-rock drumming. [...] In essence, Taylor's groove is a double-stroke roll split between his bass drum and snare drum with some cool accents played on his crash cymbals. Taylor later re-enters with a dramatic and decidedly non-punk fill to restart the groove."

== Personnel ==
- Freddie Mercury – lead and backing vocals
- Brian May – guitars, backing vocals
- Roger Taylor – drums, backing vocals
- John Deacon – bass guitar

== Remixes ==
Three different remixes were created in 1991. The first two, by Michael Wagener, were issued on different pressings of the 1991 Hollywood Records Sheer Heart Attack remaster, and on the Encino Man soundtrack. The third one, by Trent Reznor, was released on several promo CDs in 1991/1992 and 1999. The Wagener remixes are not very different from the original and feature slight remixing of the backing track. Reznor's version mixes the Queen sound with the industrial metal sound of Nine Inch Nails. Reznor's remix includes studio sound bites from Queen at the beginning and end of the track. It was intended for inclusion as the ninth track on the cancelled 1992 Hollywood Records compilation BASIC Queen Bootlegs.

== Metallica version ==
"Stone Cold Crazy"

Song by Metallica

from the album Rubáiyát: Elektra's 40th Anniversary
- Released: 1990
- Studio: Fantasy, Berkeley, California
- Length: 2:17
- Label: Elektra
- Producer: Metallica

Metallica covered the song as their contribution to the 1990 compilation album Rubáiyát: Elektra's 40th Anniversary. This cover version was later used as a B-side of their "Enter Sandman" single and subsequently won a Grammy Award; it also appeared on their covers/B-sides album Garage Inc. The Metallica version of the song is more aggressive than the original; they also slightly altered the lyrics, adding two uses of the word "fuck" and changing the more humorous lines for more violent lyrics.

James Hetfield performed the song with Queen & Tony Iommi of Black Sabbath (singing Metallica's altered lyrics) at the Freddie Mercury Tribute Concert. Metallica also played the song as an encore during their 1991–93 Nowhere Else to Roam tour; it appears on the live CD Live Shit: Binge & Purge and the 2009 live DVD Français Pour une Nuit.

== Other uses ==
The song is featured in the music video games Guitar Hero: Metallica and Rock Revolution, as well as downloadable content for Rock Band 3 and Rocksmith. It also appeared on the soundtrack of the 2021 Disney movie Cruella, where the opening verse underscores a young Cruella de Vil hijacking a car.

== See also ==
- 33rd Annual Grammy Awards
