= Live Magic =

Live album by Queen
- Released: 1 December 1986
- Recorded: 11–12 July 1986 Wembley Stadium, London, England; 27 July 1986 Népstadion, Budapest, Hungary; 9 August 1986 Knebworth Park, Stevenage, England; September 1986 (overdubs)
- Genre: Rock
- Length: 47:10 (LP); 49:22 (CD)
- Labels: EMI (UK), Hollywood (US)
- Producers: Queen; Trip Khalaf

Queen chronology
A Kind of Magic (1986)	Live Magic (1986)	The Miracle (1989)

Professional ratings
Review scores
Source	Rating
AllMusic	3/5 stars
Kerrang!	4/5 stars
Record Mirror	5/5 stars
The Rolling Stone Album Guide	2.5/5 stars
Sounds	4.5/5 stars

Live Magic is the second live album by British rock band Queen. It was recorded at various live shows during The Magic Tour and was released on 1 December 1986. However, it was not released in the United States until August 1996. It received strong criticism from fans, due to the heavy editing of many songs. For example, the opera section was removed from "Bohemian Rhapsody", the second verse and chorus were removed from "Tie Your Mother Down", and "Is This the World We Created...?", "We Will Rock You" and "We Are the Champions" were reduced to one verse and chorus.

Most of the performances were recorded at Knebworth Park on 9 August 1986, which marks the band's final ever concert with its classic line-up.

== Track listing ==
No.	Title	Writer(s)	Length
1.	"One Vision" (Knebworth Park, Stevenage, England; 9 August 1986)	Queen	5:09
2.	"Tie Your Mother Down" (Knebworth Park, Stevenage, England; 9 August 1986)	Brian May	2:59
3.	"Seven Seas of Rhye" (Knebworth Park, Stevenage, England; 9 August; 1986)	Freddie Mercury	1:21
4.	"A Kind of Magic" (Népstadion, Budapest, Hungary; 27 July; 1986)	Roger Taylor	5:29
5.	"Under Pressure" (Népstadion, Budapest, Hungary; 27 July; 1986)	Queen, David Bowie	3:49
6.	"Another One Bites the Dust" (Knebworth Park, Stevenage, England; 9 August; 1986)	John Deacon	5:51
7.	"I Want to Break Free" (Knebworth Park, Stevenage, England; 9 August; 1986)	Deacon	2:40
8.	"Is This the World We Created...?" (Wembley Stadium, London, England; 11 July; 1986)	Mercury, May	1:30
9.	"Bohemian Rhapsody" (Knebworth Park, Stevenage, England; 9 August; 1986)	Mercury	4:42
10.	"Hammer to Fall" (Wembley Stadium, London, England; 12 July; 1986)	May	5:20
11.	"Radio Ga Ga" (Knebworth Park, Stevenage, England; 9 August; 1986)	Taylor	4:27
12.	"We Will Rock You" (Knebworth Park, Stevenage, England; 9 August; 1986)	May	1:33
13.	"Friends Will Be Friends" (Knebworth Park, Stevenage, England; 9 August; 1986)	Mercury, Deacon	1:09
14.	"We Are the Champions" (Knebworth Park, Stevenage, England; 9 August; 1986)	Mercury	2:01
15.	"God Save the Queen" (Knebworth Park, Stevenage, England; 9 August; 1986)	Trad. arr. May	1:19
Total length:			49:19

== Release history ==
Country	Release date
Worldwide	1 December 1986
United States	August 1996

== Charts ==
Chart (1986–87)	Peak position
Australia (Kent Music Report)	51
Austrian Albums (Ö3 Austria)	13
Dutch Albums (Album Top 100)	24
German Albums (Offizielle Top 100)	15
New Zealand Albums (RMNZ)	36
Swedish Albums (Sverigetopplistan)	50
Swiss Albums (Schweizer Hitparade)	26
UK Albums (Official Charts)	3

Chart (2007)	Peak position
Spanish Albums (Promusicae)	87

== Certifications ==
Region	Certification	Certified units/sales
Argentina (CAPIF)	Gold	30,000^{^}
Germany (BVMI)	Gold	250,000^{^}
Poland (ZPAV) 2009 Agora SA album reissue	Platinum	20,000^{*}
Spain (Promusicae)	Gold	50,000^{^}
Switzerland (IFPI Switzerland)	Platinum	50,000^{^}
United Kingdom (BPI)	Platinum	300,000^{^}
^{*} Sales figures based on certification alone.^{^} Shipments figures based on certification alone.

== Personnel ==
Queen

- Freddie Mercury – lead vocals, piano
- Brian May – guitars, backing vocals, keyboards
- Roger Taylor – drums, backing vocals
- John Deacon – bass guitar, backing vocals

Additional musicians

- Spike Edney – keyboards, guitar, backing vocals
