= Queen at Wembley =

- Directed by: Gavin Taylor
- Produced by: Gavin Taylor; Simon Lupton; Rhys Thomas
- Starring: Freddie Mercury; Brian May; Roger Taylor; John Deacon; Spike Edney
- Edited by: Bill Saint
- Music by: Queen
- Distributed by: Picture Music International (PMI)
- Release dates: October 25, 1986 (The Tube); December 3, 1990 (worldwide)
- Running time: 300 minutes
- Country: United Kingdom
- Language: English

Queen Live at Wembley Stadium, also referred to as Queen Live At Wembley, Queen At Wembley, Queen Live At Wembley '86, Live At Wembley and Live At Wembley '86, is a live concert film by British rock band Queen at Wembley Stadium, London, England on Saturday 12 July 1986. The recording is a performance from The Magic Tour which took place during the summer of 1986.

It was originally transmitted in 1986 in the UK and released commercially in various audio and video forms in 1990 and the recent DVD.

== Release ==
=== Broadcast ===
The recorded concert was first broadcast as Queen: Real Magic on a special episode for the British music show The Tube on 25 October 1986 on Channel 4. This was transmitted in mono (as was normal before NICAM stereo became standard on UK TV in the early 1990s). However, it was simultaneously broadcast over the radio in stereo so that viewers had the option to mute their televisions, play the audio on a nearby radio and enjoy "the world's first ever stereo simulcast" in a similar way that previous live (as opposed to, in this case, pre-recorded) classical performances had sometimes been offered.

=== Home media ===
The recording was first commercially released in December 1990 as an edited VHS (missing 9 songs), then as the Live at Wembley '86 audio CD in 1992. This was followed by a DVD release as Queen: Live at Wembley Stadium (in its entirety) to coincide with the CD rerelease in 2003. The DVD has gone five times platinum in the United States, four times platinum in the United Kingdom, and achieved multi platinum status around the world. On 5 September 2011, the 25th Anniversary Edition of the concert was released as a standard 2-DVD set and a deluxe 2-DVD and 2-CD set which also included the entire Friday, 11 July 1986 concert on DVD for the first time. Eagle Rock Entertainment released a 25th anniversary edition in the US and Canada on 12 March 2013.

== Disc one ==
1. One Vision
2. Tie Your Mother Down
3. In the Lap of the Gods... Revisited
4. Seven Seas of Rhye
5. Tear It Up
6. A Kind of Magic
7. Under Pressure
8. Another One Bites the Dust
9. Who Wants to Live Forever
10. I Want to Break Free
11. Impromptu
12. Brighton Rock Solo
13. Now I'm Here
14. Love of My Life
15. Is This the World We Created?
16. (You're So Square) Baby I Don't Care
17. Hello Mary Lou
18. Tutti Frutti
19. Gimme Some Lovin'
20. Bohemian Rhapsody
21. Hammer to Fall
22. Crazy Little Thing Called Love
23. Big Spender
24. Radio Ga Ga
25. We Will Rock You
26. Friends Will Be Friends
27. We Are the Champions
28. God Save the Queen

== Disc two ==
=== Road to Wembley ===
- Brian May and Roger Taylor interview (2003) (28 mins)
- Gavin Taylor (Director) and Gerry Stickells (Tour Manager) interview (19 mins)
- A Beautiful Day – Rudi Dolezal's backstage documentary about the whole day (30 mins)
- Tribute to the Wembley Towers – including timelapse demolition footage set to 'These Are the Days of Our Lives (Instrumental)' (5 mins)

=== Unseen Magic ===
- Features 'Friday Concert Medley' – highlights package of the previous night's show (28 mins):
1. A Kind of Magic
2. Another One Bites The Dust
3. Tutti Frutti
4. Crazy Little Thing Called Love
5. We Are The Champions (ending)
6. God Save The Queen
- Rehearsals (10 mins)
- Picture Gallery (5 mins) (The background music for this extra is the full, unreleased original version of "A Kind of Magic" used in the Highlander film)

=== Queen cams ===
4 tracks presented in multi-angle Brian, Roger, John and Freddie cams:

1. One Vision
2. Under Pressure
3. Now I'm Here
4. We Are the Champions

== Audio ==
PCM Stereo & DTS 5.1 Surround Sound

== The original concert ==
The original concert started at 4.00pm with tickets costing £14.50. Four bands performed in the following order:

1. INXS
2. The Alarm
3. Status Quo
4. Queen

== Charts ==
=== Charts ===
Chart (2003)	Peak position	Ref(s)
Australian Top 40 DVDs Chart	1	
Austrian Top 10 DVDs Chart	5	
Norwegian Music DVDs Chart	3	
UK Music Video Chart (OCC)	1	

Chart (2005)	Peak position	Ref(s)
Hungarian Top 20 DVDs	7	

Chart (2018–2019)	Peak position	Ref(s)
Australia Music DVD Chart (ARIA)	1	
Spanish Music DVD Chart (Promusicae)	2	
Swiss Music DVD Chart (Hitparade)	1	
UK Music Video Chart (OCC)	1	

Chart (2026)	Peak position
Polish Albums (ZPAV)	96

== Certifications and sales ==
Region	Certification	Certified units/sales
Argentina (CAPIF)	Platinum	8,000^{^}
Australia (ARIA)	4× Platinum	60,000^{^}
Austria (IFPI Austria)	Gold	5,000^{*}
France (SNEP)	Diamond	100,000^{*}
Germany (BVMI)	4× Platinum	200,000^{^}
Italy dvd sales in 2005	—	21,000
Mexico (AMPROFON)	Platinum	20,000^{^}
New Zealand (RMNZ)	Platinum	5,000^{^}
Poland (ZPAV)	Platinum	10,000^{*}
Portugal (AFP)	Gold	4,000^{^}
Spain (Promusicae)	Platinum	25,000^{^}
United Kingdom (BPI)	7× Platinum	350,000^{^}
United States (RIAA)	5× Platinum	250,000^{^}
^{*} Sales figures based on certification alone.^{^} Shipments figures based on certification alone.
