= Yndia =

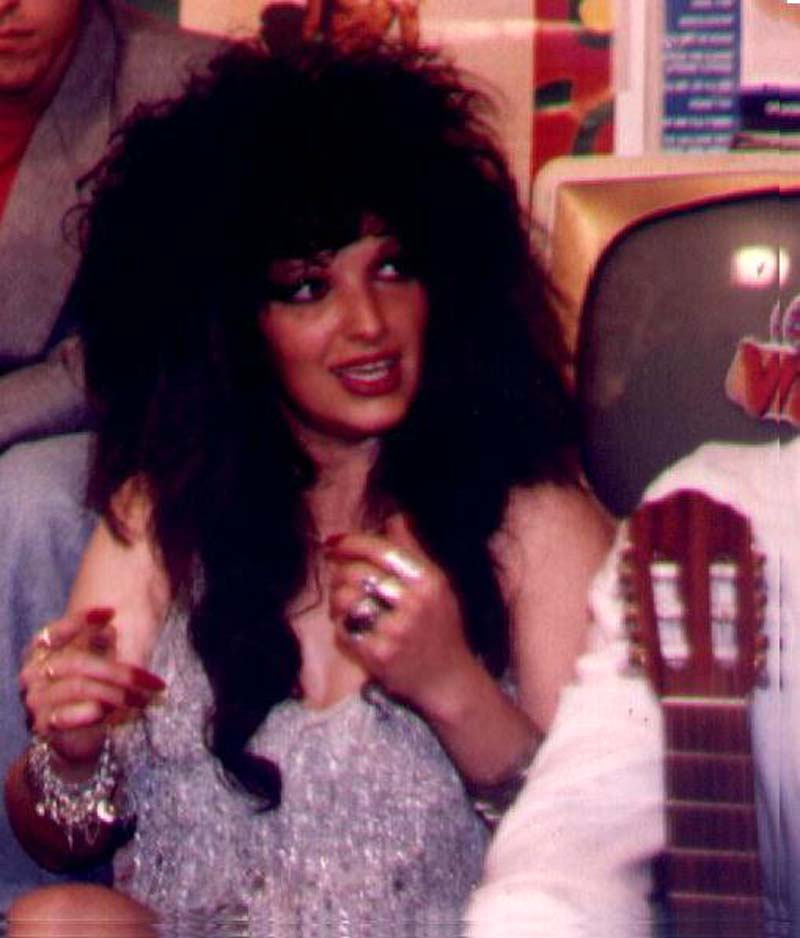
- Yndia - Interview on MTV Brazil

Background information
- Born: India Selba Rodas; 1964 (age 61–62); Asunción, Paraguay
- Genres: Pop rock
- Occupations: Singer; songwriter; music producer; actress
- Instruments: Vocals; guitar
- Years active: 1974–present
- Label: BMG RCA
- Website: soundcloud.com/yndia-selba-rodas

Yndia, stage name of India Selba Rodas (born 1964), is a singer, songwriter, and actress. She is best known for adapting and singing Spanish language versions of rock classics.

== Life and career ==
Yndia was born into a Catholic family in Asunción, Paraguay. Her father, Regino Saracho Rodas, of Guarani background, immigrated to Brazil in 1960 where he then founded the Escola Brasileira de Violão (English: "Brazilian Guitar School").

Through her father's frequent meetings with other musicians, Yndia also entered into a musical career, particularly in Spanish speaking countries.

=== First single ===
In 1989 Yndia recorded her first single with BMG Ariola Records. Her version of the song "Better be good to me" by Mike Chapman, Nicky Chinn and Holly Knight, titled "Que tu quieres de mi", reached the top spots on the Latin American charts in the early 1990s. The launch of this single won her the "Os Melhores do Paraná - Pergaminho de Ouro 1990" (English: "The Best of Paraná - Gold Parchment 1990") award. Following this, she recorded a second mixed album titled Corazon in 1993, still with BMG. This album featured "Mi Angel", a cover version of "Shine my Machine" by Suzi Quatro, and "Corazon", a cover of "One Year of Love" by John Deacon.

== Discography ==
- Que Tu quieres de mi (1990, Paraguay)
- Corazon (1993, Brazil)
- Jurassic Rock (2001, Brazil)
- Coletânea dos melhores (2013, live in Brazil)
