= A Kind of Magic (disambiguation) =

A Kind of Magic is a 1986 album by English rock band Queen.

A Kind of Magic may also refer to:

- "A Kind of Magic" (song), a 1986 song by Queen, and the title track from the album of the same name
- A Kind of Magic (TV series), a French animated television series
- A Kind of Magic (film), one of the titles used for a proposed film on the life of Freddie Mercury
- "A Kind of Magic", a storyline in the science fiction comedy webtoon series Live with Yourself!
