= Laura l'immortelle =

2007 novel by Marie-Pier Côté

- Cover
- Author: Marie-Pier Côté (plagiarized from Frédéric Jeorge)
- Language: French
- Genre: Fantasy
- Publisher: Les Éditions des Intouchables
- Publication date: January 17, 2007
- Publication place: Canada
- ISBN: 978-2-89549-258-0

Laura l'immortelle ("Laura the Immortal" in French) is a novel by Marie-Pier Côté, a Québécois Canadian author. The book was published by Les Éditions des Intouchables on January 17, 2007, when Côté was 12 years old.

The book was launched with a lot of publicity because of the author's age. The author initially stated that she secretly wrote the book between mid-October 2005 and mid-June 2006 and corresponded with a friend.

On March 13, 2007 the French-language newspaper La Presse published an article noting a list of similarities between Laura l'immortelle and the film Highlander; La Presse editor Nathaëlle Morissette discovered that the novel had similarities to the film, with one editor saying that the similarities were "a little troubling."

A Frenchman named Frédéric Jeorge received a copy of the book, and he found that almost all of the book was a copy of "Des cendres et du vent," a Highlander fan fiction written by Jeorge that was available on the Internet around late 2001. After being confronted, Côté admitted that she plagiarized the fan fiction, and presented it as an original work.

Jeorge received $4,500 as compensation from the publisher, and Michel Brûlé, the owner of the publishing company responsible for the publication of the book, said that Côté's parents also had to pay $24,469.32 as compensation to the publisher. Laura l'immortelle had about 5,000 copies printed.
