= The Queen Album =

Studio album by Elaine Paige
- Released: November 1988
- Recorded: CTS Wembley, London 1988
- Genre: Pop, rock
- Label: Siren Records, Virgin Vip
- Producer: Mike Moran

Elaine Paige chronology
Memories: The Best of Elaine Paige (1987)	The Queen Album (1988)	The Collection (1990)

The Queen Album is a solo cover album of the band Queen by Elaine Paige. It was released in 1988 and peaked at No. 51 in the UK in November 1988. This is the only album from Paige to be released on Siren Records and distributed by Virgin Records. The album was re-issued with different artwork on CD in 1990 on Virgin VIP by Virgin Records.

== Background ==
This is the only Paige album compiled of songs written and recorded by one composer or group. The album is a covers album of ten songs previously recorded by the rock group Queen, a favourite of Paige. The selected songs are a combination of hits and lesser-known album tracks, taken from Queen's entire back catalogue. The songs have been altered and re-styled for this recording, with classical arrangements making orchestral renditions of the original rock songs.

== Production ==
The Queen Album is the first of a number of Paige's albums produced by Mike Moran. They would later work together on Piaf (1994) and Essential Musicals (2006), as well as a number of tracks for Centre Stage: The Very Best of Elaine Paige (2004).

The closing track, "Radio Ga Ga", which features original BBC Radio fragments, taken from the BBC sound archives, was released as a single. The 3" CD single release included a bonus track, "Play the Game", which was not included on the album.

== Track listing ==
Side one
No.	Title	Writer(s)	Length
1.	"Bohemian Rhapsody" (from A Night at the Opera, 1975)	Freddie Mercury	5:55
2.	"A Kind of Magic" (from A Kind of Magic, 1986)	Roger Taylor	4:40
3.	"Love of My Life" (from A Night at the Opera, 1975)	Mercury	3:50
4.	"My Melancholy Blues" (from News of the World, 1977)	Mercury	4:02
5.	"Who Wants to Live Forever" (from A Kind of Magic, 1986)	Brian May	4:14

Side two
No.	Title	Writer(s)	Length
6.	"You Take My Breath Away" (from A Day at the Races, 1976)	Mercury	4:25
7.	"Las Palabras De Amor" (from Hot Space, 1982)	May	4:22
8.	"One Year of Love" (from A Kind of Magic, 1986)	John Deacon	4:57
9.	"Is This the World We Created...?" (from The Works, 1984)	May, Mercury	2:25
10.	"Radio Ga Ga" (from The Works, 1984)	Taylor	5:20

Bonus Track
No.	Title	Writer(s)	Length
11.	"Crazy Little Thing Called Love (The Boy from...) from The Game, 1980"	Mercury	2:52

== Personnel ==
=== Musicians ===
- Elaine Paige - vocals
- The New Philharmonic Orchestra
- Richard Studt, Pat Halling - orchestra leaders
- Mike Moran - keyboards
- Trevor Barry - bass guitar
- Ray Russell - guitar
- Brett Morgan - drums
- Skaila Kanga - harp
- Miriam Stockley, Mae McKenna, Phil Nicholl, Leroy Osbourne, Mick Mullens - backing vocals

=== Production ===
- Producer - Mike Moran
- Recording Engineers - Richard 'Call Me Lucky' Dodd, Stuart Bruce
- Assistant Engineers - Marsten Bailey, Martin Edwards, Alex Bardock

== Certifications ==
Region	Certification	Certified units/sales
United Kingdom (BPI)	Gold	100,000^{^}
^{^} Shipments figures based on certification alone.
