= Princes of the Universe =

- Australian single picture sleeve

Single by Queen

from the album A Kind of Magic
- B-side: "A Dozen Red Roses for My Darling" (US); "Who Wants to Live Forever" (Japan); "Gimme the Prize (Kurgan's Theme)" (Australia); "Was It All Worth It" (2000 Dutch CD single)
- Released: 12 March 1986 (US); 6 October 1986 (Japan)
- Recorded: 1985–1986
- Genre: Heavy metal; hard rock
- Length: 3:32
- Label: Capitol (US); EMI (Japan)
- Songwriter: Freddie Mercury
- Producers: Queen; Reinhold Mack

Queen singles chronology
"A Kind of Magic" (1986)	"Princes of the Universe" (1986)	"One Year of Love" (1986)

Music video
- "Princes of the Universe" on YouTube

"Princes of the Universe" is a song written by Freddie Mercury and performed by the British rock band Queen, originally released as a single in the United States on 12 March 1986 via Capitol Records. The song was written for the film Highlander, and released on the album A Kind of Magic, which also featured other selections from the Highlander song score on 2 June 1986. In 1999 it was included in Queen's compilation album Greatest Hits III.

In terms of musical style, the song is notable for being one of the most hard-edged tracks performed by the band, featuring a bombastic sound reminiscent of contemporary hard rock and heavy metal and vocals by Mercury akin to opera. A music video for the song, which featured Mercury briefly re-enacting the film's sword-fighting scene with the titular character, achieved some notoriety.

== Background ==
"Princes of the Universe", written and composed for Highlander, is the only song on the album for which Mercury receives sole credit. The song's name comes from the original working title of the film. It is played over the film's opening credits, and was later used as the opening theme for Highlander: The Series. The song was never released as a single in the United Kingdom, and while it never truly charted, it is considered a cult favourite because of its relation to the film.

== Music video ==
The music video was directed by Russell Mulcahy, and was shot on 14 February 1986 at Elstree Studios, near London, on the Silvercup rooftop stage used for the film. It consists mostly of Queen performing the song, intercut with scenes from Highlander. Christopher Lambert reprises his role as Connor MacLeod for a brief appearance in the video, where he sword fights Freddie Mercury, who uses his microphone stand as a sword. Brian May is seen playing a Washburn RR11V instead of his Red Special. The video was regularly played on MTV. It was released on Greatest Flix III (VHS, 1999) and Greatest Video Hits 2 (DVD, 2003).

== Charts ==
Chart (1986)	Peak position
Australia (ARIA)	32

Chart (2000)	Peak position
Netherlands (Single Top 100)	45

== Personnel ==
- Freddie Mercury – lead and backing vocals, synthesizer
- Brian May – lead and rhythm guitars, backing vocals
- Roger Taylor – drums, backing vocals
- John Deacon – bass guitar

== In popular culture ==
The song is also featured in the 2026 film, Masters of the Universe, as a background rally song. Brian May served as a collaborator for the soundtrack, working together with Daniel Pemberton.

== See also ==
- 1986 in music
- Queen discography
