= Pain Is So Close to Pleasure =

1986 single by Queen

- US single picture sleeve

Single by Queen

from the album A Kind of Magic
- B-side: "Don't Lose Your Head"
- Released: 20 August 1986 (US)
- Recorded: 1985–1986
- Genre: Rock; soul; funk; Blue-eyed soul; alternative dance
- Length: 4:23 (album version); 3:57 (single version); 5:56 (12" extended version)
- Label: EMI (Germany); Capitol (US)
- Songwriters: Freddie Mercury; John Deacon
- Producers: Queen; David Richards

Queen singles chronology
"Friends Will Be Friends" (1986)	"Pain Is So Close to Pleasure" (1986)	"Who Wants to Live Forever" (1986)

"Pain Is So Close to Pleasure" is a song by Queen, included on their 1986 album A Kind of Magic, written by Freddie Mercury and John Deacon, released as a single in the US and Canada in August 1986, and in Germany and the Netherlands in February 1987.

The single reached #56 at the German charts and #43 on the Dutch charts. "Pain Is So Close to Pleasure" has more than 58,000 hits on Lastfm.

== Background ==
The song began as a riff idea by Brian May, then Freddie Mercury and John Deacon turned it into a song, with Deacon playing rhythm guitar. The title also appears as a line in "One Year of Love".

The version which appears on the single is a remix, rearranging much of the backing track from the original elements. The 12" single features an extended version of this remix, rather than an extended version of the track as it appears on the album.

== Critical reception ==
In the US, Billboard noted that "Pain Is So Close to Pleasure" sees Queen "pay stylistic homage" to Smokey Robinson. Cash Box described it as a "classic-sounding track featuring Mercury's high-flying falsetto" and added that the "smart and tight production could make this a favorite at radio".

== Personnel ==
- Freddie Mercury – vocals, piano, synthesizer, sampler
- Brian May – lead guitar
- Roger Taylor – drums
- John Deacon – bass guitar, rhythm guitar, synthesizer, drum machine, sampler
- Spike Edney – synthesizer

== Charts ==
Country (1987)	Peak position
Belgium (Ultratop 50 Flanders)	27
Netherlands (Dutch Top 40)	26
Netherlands (Single Top 100)	43
West Germany (GfK)	57
