= Magic Tour (Queen) =

1986 concert tour by Queen

The Magic Tour
- European tour by Queen
- Poster for the concert in Stockholm
- Location: Europe
- Associated album: A Kind of Magic
- Start date: 7 June 1986
- End date: 9 August 1986
- Legs: 1
- No. of shows: 26

Queen concert chronology
- The Works Tour (1984–1985); The Magic Tour (1986); The Freddie Mercury Tribute Concert (1992)

The Magic Tour was a European concert tour by the British rock band Queen in 1986. The tour was in support of their twelfth studio album, A Kind of Magic, and featured 26 shows across Western Europe. In addition, the band performed one show behind the Iron Curtain in Hungary.

The highlight of the tour was two sold-out shows at Wembley Stadium on 11–12 July, which were filmed; the 12 July show was released as Queen at Wembley. The final show of the tour, held at Knebworth Park on 9 August in front of at least 120,000 fans, was the last time that lead singer Freddie Mercury performed live with Queen before his death five years later.

== Background ==
Queen's tour in 1986 featured 26 shows and marked the band's first concert series since their performance at Live Aid in July 1985, which earned them high praise and boosted their popularity. The tour included support acts such as the Alarm, Belouis Some, Marillion, INXS and Status Quo.

Preparations for the tour started in May 1986, and the band rehearsed for four weeks, which was their longest preparation for a stage show. Despite promoters' uncertainty about whether they would sell enough tickets for stadium and outdoor venues, the gigs were met with high demand.

In addition to debuting new songs like "One Vision" and "Who Wants to Live Forever", the band decided to reintroduce some older tracks and an acoustic rock 'n' roll medley into their set. The final part of the show repeated the six songs Queen had played at Live Aid. The band also added a new song, "Friends Will Be Friends", as the final encore between "We Will Rock You" and "We Are the Champions". Freddie Mercury personally asked his friend Diana Moseley to design stage clothes for the band, including a large crown and gown which he wore at the end of the show. The stage was 160 feet (49 m) long and flanked by two 40-foot (12 m) runways. Roger Taylor said the new stage show would make "Ben Hur look like the Muppets".

== Itinerary ==
The tour began on 7 June 1986 in Stockholm. During the 21 June concert at the Maimarktgelände, Mannheim, Marillion frontman Fish sang "Tutti Frutti" with Mercury. Five days later at the Waldbühne, West Berlin, the group played an impromptu version of Led Zeppelin's "Immigrant Song". A cover of Shirley Bassey's "Big Spender" was performed twice on the tour, having been regularly featured in the group's early days.

The concert at Slane Castle on 5 July was marred by bad weather and crowd violence. The group played St James' Park, Newcastle, on 9 July. All profits for the concert were donated to Save the Children Fund. Support band INXS were delayed because of traffic. During the tour, Mercury told the audience about rumours that Queen would disband, and flatly denied them.

All 72,000 tickets for the 11 July show at Wembley Stadium sold out quickly, so a second date was added for the following night. The group played for over 150,000 people over the two nights. The first was played during bad weather, but the second was clear and filmed by Tyne Tees and recorded by Capital Radio for a future television and radio broadcast. Giant inflatable models representing the cartoon version of the group on the A Kind of Magic album cover were released; three were caught by the crowd, while one landed in Chelmsford approximately 35 miles away. During the show, Mercury addressed the audience, again denying rumours that Queen were splitting up, adding "we're gonna stay together until we fucking well die". After the second show, Mercury played an impromptu set at Kensington Roof Gardens with Fish, Samantha Fox and Gary Glitter.

The concert at the Népstadion, Budapest, on 27 July was one of the first concerts by a major rock group behind the Iron Curtain. As well as 80,000 tickets selling out, a further estimated 45,000 people listened to the group outside. Some fans had travelled from as far away as Russia and Poland to see the concert. The show was professionally filmed on 35 mm movie film by 17 of Hungary's best cameramen. The gear employed, including seventeen cameras and 25 miles of film, was all that was accessible in the country, and the Hungarian government approved the entire operation. During the show, the group performed an acoustic arrangement of the traditional Hungarian folk song "Tavaszi Szél Vizet Áraszt". Mercury wrote the lyrics on the palm of his hand.

The Knebworth concert on 9 August 1986 was added to the end of the tour because earlier dates at Wembley Stadium had sold out. 120,000 fans attended, making it the group's biggest UK concert. The stage featured 5,000 amplifiers, 8.6 miles (13.8 km) of cable and a 20-by-30-foot (6.1 m × 9.1 m) video screen. This was the last live concert featuring the classic line-up of Queen. Henry Lytton Cobbold, 3rd Baron Cobbold, owner of Knebworth Castle, later said he felt it was one of the best Queen gigs, but owing to an oversight, nobody remembered to tape video footage of the concert, although the show was professionally multitracked, along with handheld audience footage capturing the show. Queen flew into the show from Battersea Heliport in West London in a helicopter emblazoned Queen A Magic Tour, photographed from an accompanying aircraft by official tour photographer Denis O'Regan, as featured across the centrefold of the Live Magic album.

The tour played to more than 400,000 fans, and earned the group £11 million.

== Aftermath ==
After the tour, Mercury told his bandmates that he did not want to do any more large-scale shows. In spring 1987, he was diagnosed as having AIDS. When the group reconvened to record The Miracle in 1989, the press were informed that Mercury wanted to "break the cycle of album, tour, album, tour" and consequently the album would not have any accompanying live performances. He died on 24 November 1991. Queen did not undertake another full tour until 14 years later, when the Queen + Paul Rodgers Tour began in March 2005. By then, John Deacon had retired from music, and did not take part.

== Releases ==
Several concerts from the tour have been released commercially. The album Live Magic, containing greatly edited highlights, was released in December 1986 and was a top 5 hit. The second Wembley gig has been released several times. The full audio was released as a CD Live at Wembley '86 in 1992. A video, Queen at Wembley was released in 1990, containing only part of the show, with multiple overdubs and other edits. It was followed by the full concert on DVD in 2003. Part of the first night at Wembley also featured on this DVD and was released in full in 2011, with minor edits. The Budapest show has been released as Live in Budapest on VHS and Laserdisc. The show was later remastered, remixed and retitled as Hungarian Rhapsody: Queen Live in Budapest in 2012.

== Tour dates ==
Lists of concerts, showing date, city, country, venue, opening act and number of available tickets
Date	City	Country	Venue	Opening act	Attendance
7 June 1986	Stockholm	Sweden	Råsunda Stadium	Gary Moore; Treat	37,500 / 37,500
11 June 1986	Leiden	Netherlands	Groenoordhallen	INXS	25,600 / 25,600
12 June 1986	Leiden	Netherlands	Groenoordhallen	INXS	25,600 / 25,600
14 June 1986	Paris	France	Hippodrome de Vincennes	Belouis Some; Level 42; Marillion	40,000 / 65,000
17 June 1986	Brussels	Belgium	Forest National	Dayman	9,200 / 9,200
19 June 1986	Leiden	Netherlands	Groenoordhallen	INXS; Craaft	12,800 / 12,800
21 June 1986	Mannheim	West Germany	Maimarktgelände	Craaft; Gary Moore; Level 42; Marillion	85,700 / 115,000
26 June 1986	West Berlin	West Germany	Waldbühne	Craaft; Marillion	22,600 / 22,600
28 June 1986	Munich	West Germany	Olympiahalle	Craaft	22,400 / 22,400
29 June 1986	Munich	West Germany	Olympiahalle	Craaft	22,400 / 22,400
1 July 1986	Zürich	Switzerland	Hallenstadion	Craaft	22,800 / 22,800
2 July 1986	Zürich	Switzerland	Hallenstadion	Craaft	22,800 / 22,800
5 July 1986 (Note: The 5 July 1986 concert in Slane was part of Slane Festival.)	County Meath	Ireland	Slane Castle	Chris Rea; The Fountainhead; The Bangles	90,000 / 120,000
9 July 1986	Newcastle	England	St James' Park	Status Quo; Zeno	38,000 / 38,000
11 July 1986	London	England	Wembley Stadium	INXS; Status Quo; The Alarm	144,000 / 144,000
12 July 1986	London	England	Wembley Stadium	INXS; Status Quo; The Alarm	144,000 / 144,000
16 July 1986	Manchester	England	Maine Road	Belouis Some; Status Quo	35,000 / 35,000
19 July 1986	Cologne	West Germany	Müngersdorfer Stadion	Craaft; Gary Moore; Level 42; Marillion	50,000 / 50,000
21 July 1986	Vienna	Austria	Wiener Stadthalle	Craaft	24,000 / 24,000
22 July 1986	Vienna	Austria	Wiener Stadthalle	Craaft	24,000 / 24,000
27 July 1986	Budapest	Hungary	Népstadion	Craaft; ZiZi Labor	80,000 / 80,000
30 July 1986 (Note: The 30 July 1986 concert in Fréjus was originally scheduled to take place at Stade de l'Ouest in Nice.)	Fréjus	France	Arènes de Fréjus	Craaft	15,000 / 15,000
1 August 1986	Barcelona	Spain	Mini Estadi	Craaft	34,000 / 34,000
3 August 1986	Madrid	Spain	Vallecas Stadium	Craaft	25,000 / 25,000
5 August 1986	Marbella	Spain	Estadio Municipal de Marbella	Craaft	26,000 / 26,000
9 August 1986 (Note: The 9 August 1986 concert in Stevenage was part of A Night of Summer Magic.)	Stevenage	England	Knebworth Park	Belouis Some; Big Country; Status Quo	120,000 / 120,000

== Personnel ==
Queen

- Freddie Mercury – lead vocals, piano, rhythm guitar ("Crazy Little Thing Called Love")
- Brian May – electric guitar, acoustic guitar, backing vocals, keyboards ("Who Wants to Live Forever")
- Roger Taylor – drums, tambourine, backing vocals
- John Deacon – bass guitar, backing vocals

Additional musicians

- Spike Edney – keyboards, piano, backing vocals, rhythm guitar ("Hammer to Fall")

== See also ==
- List of highest-attended concerts
