= Stevie Ann =

Dutch singer-songwriter

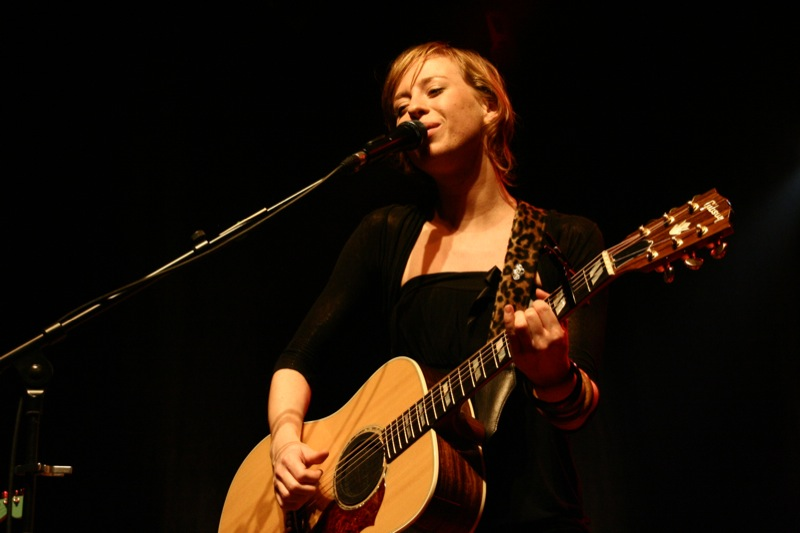
- Stevie Ann live in London, April 2006

Background information
- Born: Anna Stephanie Struijk; 24 June 1986; Roggel, Netherlands
- Genres: Pop; country; folk; Jazz
- Occupations: Singer-songwriter, musician
- Instruments: Vocals, guitar
- Years active: 2005–present
- Label: CNR Music
- Website: https://www.stephaniestruijk.nl

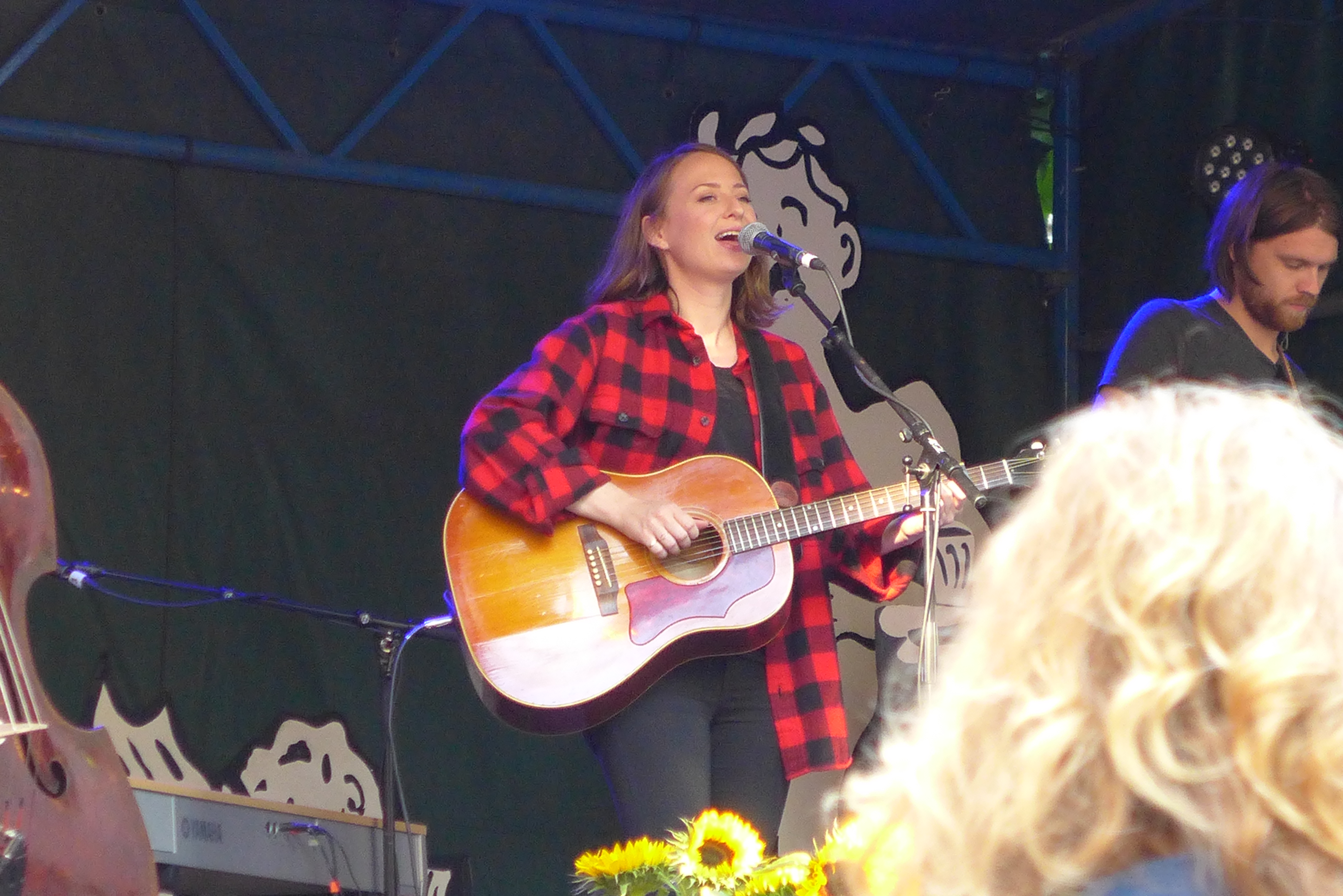
Stevie Ann at the poëziefestival Het Tuinfeest in Deventer, 6 Augustus 2016

Stevie Ann (born Anna Stephanie Struijk in Roggel, 24 June 1986) is a Dutch singer-songwriter.

== Biography ==
Stevie Ann was born as Anna Stephanie Struijk in Roggel, on 24 June 1986. She started making music at a very young age. From the first moment she learned how to play the guitar she started writing songs. In the summer of 2005 her debut album Away from Here was released. The album contains twelve tracks, all written by Ann.

The song "The Poetry Man", was released in December 2005, and gained airplay on a number of major Dutch radio stations. It is her highest charting single to date, peaking at No. 26 on the Dutch Top 40.

In her career, Ann won several awards. In November 2005, she received an Essent Award, an award for young and promising Dutch artists. In February 2006, she won a Zilveren Harp (Silver Harp). Ann was also named best new artist at the Dutch 3FM Awards.

In October 2006, Stevie Ann started a tour running until January 2007. During November 2006 she played the opening of James Morrison's concerts in the Netherlands.

== Discography ==
=== Albums ===
- Away From Here (2005)
- Closer to the Heart (2007)
- Light Up (2010)
- California Sounds (2013)
- Stephanie Struijk (2016)
- Fijn zo (2021)
- Dezelfde Zon (2024)

=== Live-albums ===
- Live & Acoustic (2010)

=== EPs ===
- Changes (Klimaatwet EP) (2008)
- X-Mas (2014)

=== Singles ===
- "Away From Here" (2005)
- "The Poetry Man" (2005)
- "You Versus Me" (2006)
- "One Year of Love" (Queen cover) (2006)
- "Get Away" (2007)
- "Baby Blue" (2008)
- "You're My Best Friend" (Queen cover) (2014)
