= Deacy Amp =

Electric guitar amplifier

The Deacy Amp (pronounced "Deeky" /ˈdiːki/) is an electric guitar amplifier created in 1972 by Queen's bassist John Deacon, who is an electronics engineer by training. The amplifier circuit board from a Supersonic PR80 portable radio found in a builder's skip was fitted into a speaker cabinet and powered by a 9-volt battery. The amplifier had no volume or tone controls and for most of its history it was never broken and thus never repaired. It was used along with Queen lead guitarist Brian May's Red Special electric guitar and treble booster to produce sounds reminiscent of various orchestral instruments, such as violin, cello, trombone, clarinet, or even vocals, starting from the songs "Mad The Swine" (an unreleased song from the 1973 album Queen) and "Procession" from the 1974 album Queen II.

== KAT Deacy Amp replica ==
In 1998, Greg Fryer undertook the job of trying to make three copies of the Deacy Amp with May's full backing with the help of UK amplifier specialist Dave Petersen. These amplifiers produced a similar compressed and saturated sound but lacked the tonal characteristics that were so crucial to the unique Deacy sound. In 2003, Nigel Knight became involved in the amplifier's development. Several prototype amplifiers were built that were continually edging closer to the sound of the original but all fell short of the mark when compared side by side with the real amplifier. It was only in 2008 when Knight was given permission to take the original Deacy Amp apart and test and analyse each individual component that he finally began to understand the intricate workings.

With this new information in hand, Knight called on speaker manufacturers Celestion, who developed and produced nearly 30 prototypes for testing and analysis over a two-year period. Custom transformers were produced to exact winding and laminate specs, obsolete components were sourced and made RoHS compliant and bespoke cabinets were constructed from Sapele veneered chipboard, exactly as the original.

In 2010, some 12 years after the project commenced, The Brian May Deacy Amp replica was given the official approval and blessing of both Brian May and John Deacon.

The first production run of KAT Deacy Amp replicas were shipped in March 2011 and sold out within one month. Production of the KAT Deacy Amp was later discontinued.

== Vox VBM-1 Brian May Special Amplifier ==
In 2003, Vox released the VBM-1 Brian May Special amplifier. This mains-powered unit combined a treble booster with the sound of the Deacy amp circuit with a 10W amplifier pushing an integrated 1 × 6.5" twin cone speaker.

Brian May had allowed the Vox engineers to study the original Deacy amp to enable them to develop the circuitry required to accurately reproduce the original sound.

The amp featured a unique white vinyl covering on a traditional-looking Vox amplifier design with a Brian May 'Back to the Light' star logo in the lower right corner of the grille cloth.

The top-mounted controls from left to right are:

- 1/4" input jack socket
- Gain knob
- Booster input
- Gain (high/low) push switch
- Tone knob
- Volume knob
- 1/4" recording/headphone output jack socket
- 1/4" external speaker output jack socket

The three knobs were of a 'chickenhead' design.

Vox discontinued the VBM-1 amp in 2005.
