= A Kind of Magic =

1986 studio album by Queen

Studio album by Queen
- Released: 2 June 1986
- Recorded: September 1985 – April 1986
- Studios: Musicland (Munich, West Germany); Mountain (Montreux); Townhouse (London, UK); Abbey Road (London, UK)
- Genres: Hard rock; pop rock
- Length: 40:42
- Labels: EMI; Capitol
- Producers: Queen; Mack; David Richards

Queen chronology
The Complete Works (1985)	A Kind of Magic (1986)	Live Magic (1986)

Queen studio album chronology
The Works (1984)	A Kind of Magic (1986)	The Miracle (1989)

Singles from A Kind of Magic
- 1. "One Vision" Released: 4 November 1985; 2. "Princes of the Universe" Released: 12 March 1986 (US); 3. "A Kind of Magic" Released: 17 March 1986 (UK); 4. "Friends Will Be Friends" Released: 9 June 1986 (UK); 5. "Pain Is So Close to Pleasure" Released: 20 August 1986 (US); 6. "Who Wants to Live Forever" Released: 15 September 1986; 7. "One Year of Love" Released: September 1986 (France)

A Kind of Magic is the twelfth studio album by the British rock band Queen, released on 2 June 1986 by EMI Records in the UK and on 27 June 1986 by Capitol Records in the US. It is based on the soundtrack to the film Highlander (1986), directed by Russell Mulcahy.

A Kind of Magic was Queen's first album to be released since they had received acclaim for their performance at Live Aid in 1985. It was an immediate hit in the UK, going straight to number one and selling 100,000 copies in its first week. It remained in the UK charts for 63 weeks, selling 600,000 in the UK alone. The album spawned four hit singles: the album's title track "A Kind of Magic", "One Vision", "Friends Will Be Friends", and "Who Wants to Live Forever", which features an orchestra conducted by Michael Kamen, while the album's final track, "Princes of the Universe", is the theme song to Highlander.

The album was promoted during the Magic Tour, which included two concerts in London's Wembley Stadium, and would turn out to be the band's final tour with its original formation, although they would record three more albums with Freddie Mercury as lead vocalist before his death in 1991.

== Background and recording—A Kind of Magic and Highlander ==
The album enjoys the status of an unofficial soundtrack for the 1986 film Highlander, for which no official soundtrack album was released. The title, "A Kind of Magic", derived from one of the lines character Connor MacLeod (Christopher Lambert) says to describe his immortality. Six out of nine songs on the album appeared in the film, although in different versions. The three songs that did not appear in Highlander are "Pain Is So Close to Pleasure", "Friends Will Be Friends" and "One Vision", which was featured a year earlier in the film Iron Eagle. Conversely, a recording of "Theme from New York, New York" made specifically for a scene in Highlander does not appear on A Kind of Magic, and in fact has never been released in album form to date. Band member Brian May, according to a statement he made on the Greatest Video Hits 2 DVD (2003), had, at least at that point, the intention to work on a proper Highlander soundtrack in the future. In one scene, a snippet of "Hammer to Fall" plays on a radio, a song from the previously released The Works album.

== Songs ==
=== Side one ===
==== "One Vision" ====
After Queen's contribution to Live Aid, Freddie Mercury was enthusiastic about the band and soon after called them to go to the studio and write a song together which became "One Vision". All four band members were credited as songwriters; however, Roger Taylor stated in an interview with Australian TV that originally it had been his song, with lyrics reflecting Martin Luther King Jr. He joked that "that rotter Freddie" changed all his lyrics with additions like "one shrimp, one prawn, one clam, one chicken", and even name-checked John Deacon. Brian May played the opening synth section using a Yamaha DX-7. The sessions were filmed and later released on the 2003 DVD set Greatest Video Hits 2. The song does not appear in Highlander, but was used in the 1986 movie Iron Eagle.

==== "A Kind of Magic" ====
"A Kind of Magic" was written by Taylor. He has admitted writing down some lyrics, which proved to be the basis for both "One Vision" and "A Kind of Magic", something made obvious by the demo of the song appearing for the first time on the 2011 Universal bonus EP, which mixes some lyrics. Later on, unbeknownst to Taylor who had gone to the US for a few days, Mercury took it over, "polished" the lyrics, added the bassline, some connectors and re-arranged the structure. Regardless, the new, more pop-oriented version was still credited to Taylor. It was this version that was featured on the album, released as a single and included their auxiliary live musician, Spike Edney, playing some keyboards. The heavier, rockier alternate version, also making its official debut on the 2011 Universal bonus EP, played during the end credits of Highlander. The song was covered by Elaine Paige in 1988 on her album called The Queen Album.

==== "One Year of Love" ====
"One Year of Love" is a song by John Deacon. The album version features him playing Yamaha DX7 synth, a string orchestra conducted by Lynton Naiff and a saxophone played by Steve Gregory. Deacon decided to substitute the guitar components with a saxophone solo after a discussion with May, who does not appear in the song. It was released as a single only in France and Spain, and appeared during a bar scene and an instrumental piano version appeared in a scene where Connor Macleod was in Brenda Wyatt's apartment in Highlander. It was also covered by Elaine Paige on The Queen Album in 1988 and later by Dutch singer Stevie Ann in 2006.

==== "Pain Is So Close to Pleasure" ====
"Pain Is So Close to Pleasure" was written by Mercury and Deacon. Beginning as a riff idea by May, Deacon and Mercury subsequently turned that into a Motown-style song, with Deacon playing rhythm guitar. A slightly remixed and reworked version was released as a single in 1986, reaching No. 26 on the Dutch charts. The title also appears as a line in "One Year of Love".

==== "Friends Will Be Friends" ====
"Friends Will Be Friends" is a song by Mercury and Deacon, with lyrics written by Mercury. It is one of the last of Mercury's piano ballads, and bears some similarity to "Play the Game" and "We Are the Champions". It did not feature in Highlander. It was noted as being a modern update of the 1970s Queen rock anthems "We Are the Champions" and "We Will Rock You", and reached No. 14 in the UK. During the Magic Tour, the song was played between "We Will Rock You" and "We Are The Champions", the traditional closing songs of Queen live performances.

=== Side two ===
==== "Who Wants to Live Forever" ====
"Who Wants to Live Forever" was composed by May, and sung in the album version as a duet between himself and Mercury. Synthesizer parts are played on a Yamaha DX-7 by May, and the orchestra was arranged and conducted by Michael Kamen. Deacon did not participate, and Taylor played some drum-machine parts and contributed backing vocals. Percussion was taken over by the orchestra as well as double bass, in spite of Taylor and Deacon miming those parts respectively in the video. It serves as somewhat of a "love theme" of Highlander, as it adds to the sub-plot of the movie. In the film, Mercury sings the opening of the song as well, unlike the album version, which has May singing.

==== "Gimme the Prize (Kurgan's Theme)" ====
"Gimme the Prize" was written by May. This song is widely known for its heavy metal features. It is featured in Highlander, and also samples various lines from the film, most notably "I have something to say: It's better to burn out than to fade away" and "There can be only one", spoken by actors Clancy Brown (The Kurgan) and Christopher Lambert (Connor MacLeod) respectively. Director Russell Mulcahy states in the DVD commentary that this was his least favourite of the band's songs used in the film because he does not like heavy metal. May also commented to a Japanese magazine in 1986 that both Mercury and Deacon hated the song.

==== "Don't Lose Your Head" ====
"Don't Lose Your Head" was composed by Taylor and features singer Joan Armatrading in a vocal cameo. The song takes its name from a line spoken in Highlander, and is played for a short time when Kurgan kidnaps Brenda. The song then segues into a cover of "Theme from New York, New York", though it is only a small clip. It is also featured in an episode of Highlander: The Series titled "Free Fall". An instrumental version of the track entitled "A Dozen Red Roses for My Darling" is featured as the B-side to "A Kind of Magic".

==== "Princes of the Universe" ====
"Princes of the Universe" is the film's theme song and the only song on the album for which Mercury received sole credit. It is quite a complex and heavy work, showing Queen returning to their hard rock roots. The song is played in the opening credits of Highlander. The music video uses clips and scenery from the movie, as well as a cameo by Christopher Lambert, who fights with Mercury on part of the film set at Elstree Studios, London on 14 February 1986. The song's name comes from the original working title of the film.

== Singles ==
- Queen recorded "One Vision", released in the UK on 4 November 1985, the first after their much-lauded appearance at the Live Aid concert. It did well on the charts, reaching No. 7 in the UK and making the top ten throughout Europe. The song appeared in Iron Eagle.
- "A Kind of Magic", released in the UK on 17 March 1986, reached No. 3 on its home chart. While charting well everywhere else, it peaked at No. 42 in the US and has been played on radio mostly in New England (similar to their first single "Keep Yourself Alive"). Russell Mulcahy, director of Highlander, directed the song's accompanying video.
- "Friends Will Be Friends", released on 9 June 1986, reached No. 14 in the UK and made the top 40 throughout Europe.
- "Who Wants to Live Forever", released on 15 September 1986, reached No. 24 in the UK. The National Philharmonic Orchestra featured in the song's video, along with forty choirboys and 2000 candles.
- "Pain Is So Close to Pleasure", released in the US and parts of Europe only.
- "One Year of Love", released in France and Spain only.
- "Princes of the Universe" was never released as a single in the UK. It was, however, released as a single in Australia, and became a mild hit, reaching No. 28 in the spring of 1986. The song has been a cult favourite, due to Highlander, in the US. It was also used as the theme music for the Highlander television series, which aired from 1992 to 1998. The music video featured Christopher Lambert and the band on part of the film set at Elstree Studios in London and is cut with scenes from the film. The song also appears on Greatest Hits III. It was released as a single in the Netherlands on 28 February 2000.

== Reception ==
Professional ratings
Review scores
Source	Rating
AllMusic	3/5 stars
Chicago Tribune	1/4 stars
Encyclopedia of Popular Music	3/5 stars
Kerrang!	3/5 stars
MusicHound Rock	2.5/5 stars
The Rolling Stone Album Guide	2/5 stars
Sounds	2.5/5 stars

Rolling Stone described the album as "heavy plastic", concluding: "This band might as well put some pomp back in its rock. Its members are never going to make it as dignified elder statesmen". The Times described the album as one of "the most spectacularly successful releases this year", yet questioned its appeal, asking, "why does it not extend to those of us who are given the records to review?" People Weekly wrote: "There's hardly a personal expression, let alone an intimate one, in this album... The group can be dazzling. In this case they're just overbearing". Kerrang!'s Paul Henderson wondered "how much of the album is the 'real' Queen and how much is the result of the constraints/musical slant imposed upon them by writing material to go with a movie", concluding that "only a band of Queen's stature (...) could put out an album of such diverse songs without disappointing a sizeable portion of their fans".

In a retrospective review, Greg Prato of AllMusic wrote: "It may not have been as cohesive as some of their other albums, but A Kind of Magic was their best work in some time". Queen biographer Mark Blake wrote: "The album's confused origins made for a somewhat uneven listening experience... only the title cut and 'Who Wants to Live Forever' were songs that would survive the album's natural shelf life. Like every Queen record since Jazz, A Kind of Magic was a so-so album, cleverly loaded with two or three potential hit singles".

In the 1994 edition of The Guinness All Time Top 1000 Albums, the album was voted No. 171 in the all-time greatest rock and pop albums. In 2006, a national BBC poll saw the album voted the 42nd-greatest album of all time. In 2007, Classic Rock ranked A Kind of Magic the 28th-greatest soundtrack album of all time.

== Track listing ==
All lead vocals by Freddie Mercury unless noted.

Side one
No.	Title	Writer(s)	Length
1.	"One Vision"	Roger Taylor; Freddie Mercury; Brian May; John Deacon	5:11
2.	"A Kind of Magic"	Taylor	4:24
3.	"One Year of Love"	Deacon	4:27
4.	"Pain Is So Close to Pleasure"	Mercury; Deacon	4:21
5.	"Friends Will Be Friends"	Mercury; Deacon	4:06

Side two
No.	Title	Writer(s)	Lead vocals	Length
6.	"Who Wants to Live Forever"	May	Mercury and May	5:15
7.	"Gimme the Prize (Kurgan's Theme)"	May		4:33
8.	"Don't Lose Your Head"	Taylor	Mercury with Joan Armatrading	4:38
9.	"Princes of the Universe"	Mercury		3:33
Total length:				40:42

- Sides one and two were combined as tracks 1–9 on the CD release.

Extra tracks (CD release only)
No.	Title	Writer(s)	Lead vocals	Length
10.	"A Kind of 'A Kind of Magic' " (Second half of the extended version of "A Kind of Magic")	Taylor		3:38
11.	"Friends Will Be Friends Will Be Friends..." (Extended version of "Friends Will Be Friends")	Mercury, Deacon		5:58
12.	"Forever" (Piano version of "Who Wants to Live Forever")	May	Instrumental	3:20
Total length:				52:58

Bonus tracks (1991 Hollywood Records CD reissue)
No.	Title	Length
10.	"Forever"	3:20
11.	"One Vision" (Extended Version)	6:23
Total length:		50:25

Disc 2: Bonus EP (2011 Universal Music CD reissue)
No.	Title	Length
1.	"A Kind of Magic" (Highlander version)	4:22
2.	"One Vision" (Single Version)	4:00
3.	"Pain Is So Close to Pleasure" (Single Remix)	3:57
4.	"Forever"	3:20
5.	"A Kind of Vision" (Demo, August 1985)	3:23
6.	"One Vision" (live at Wembley Stadium, 11 July 1986)	5:12
7.	"Friends Will Be Friends Will Be Friends..."	5:59
Total length:		30:13

Bonus videos (2011 iTunes deluxe edition)
No.	Title	Length
8.	"One Vision" (Extended promo video)	6:28
9.	"Princes of the Universe" (Promo video)	3:31
10.	"A Kind of Magic" (live at Wembley Stadium, July 11, 1986)	6:46
Total length:		46:18

== Personnel ==
Personnel taken from A Kind of Magic liner notes.

Queen

- Freddie Mercury – vocals, keyboards
- Brian May – guitar, vocals, keyboards
- Roger Taylor – drums, vocals, keyboards
- John Deacon – bass guitar, keyboards, additional guitar

Additional musicians

- Spike Edney – additional keyboards
- Chris Rea – fingerclicks on "A Kind of Magic"
- Steve Gregory – saxophone on "One Year of Love"
- Joan Armatrading – incidental vocals on "Don't Lose Your Head"
- Lynton Naiff – arranged and conducted string section on "One Year of Love"
- National Philharmonic Orchestra – arranged by Michael Kamen and May and conducted by Kamen on "Who Wants to Live Forever"

Production

- Queen – production (all tracks)
- Mack – production, engineering (all except "A Kind of Magic", "Who Wants to Live Forever", "Gimme the Prize (Kurgan's Theme)", and "Don't Lose Your Head")
- David Richards – production, engineering on "A Kind of Magic", "Who Wants to Live Forever", "Gimme the Prize (Kurgan's Theme)", and "Don't Lose Your Head"
- Croydon – assistant engineer
- Eric Tomlinson – orchestra recording on "Who Wants to Live Forever" (at Abbey Road)
- Kevin Metcalf – mastering

Design

- Richard Gray – sleeve design
- Roger Chiasson – album cover illustration, other illustrations
- Mike Smith – other illustrations
- Chuck Gramage – other illustrations
- Jenny Robinson – colour
- Peter Hince – photograph

== Charts ==
=== Weekly charts ===
Chart (1986)	Peak position
Argentinian Albums Chart	1
Australian Albums (Kent Music Report)	12
Austrian Albums (Ö3 Austria)	3
Canada Top Albums/CDs (RPM)	50
Dutch Albums (Album Top 100)	2
Finnish Albums (The Official Finnish Charts)	10
French Albums (SNEP)	6
German Albums (Offizielle Top 100)	4
Italian Albums (Musica e Dischi)	13
Japanese Albums (Oricon)	25
New Zealand Albums (RMNZ)	9
Norwegian Albums (VG-lista)	5
Swedish Albums (Sverigetopplistan)	9
Swiss Albums (Schweizer Hitparade)	4
UK Albums (Official Charts)	1
US Billboard 200	46

Chart (2005)	Peak position
Italian Albums (FIMI)	94

Chart (2011)	Peak position
Belgian Albums (Ultratop Wallonia)	88
Spanish Albums (Promusicae)	91

Chart (2022)	Peak position
Polish Albums (ZPAV)	42

Chart (2025)	Peak position
Greek Albums (IFPI)	18

=== Year-end charts ===
Chart (1986)	Position
Australian Albums Chart	68
Austrian Albums Chart	16
New Zealand Albums (RMNZ)	36
Swiss Albums Chart	18
UK Albums Chart	8

== Certifications ==
Region	Certification	Certified units/sales
Austria (IFPI Austria)	Platinum	50,000^{*}
Brazil (Pro-Música Brasil)	Gold	100,000^{*}
France (SNEP)	Gold	100,000^{*}
Germany (BVMI)	3× Gold	750,000^{^}
Italy (FIMI) sales since 2009	Gold	25,000^{‡}
New Zealand (RMNZ)	Gold	7,500^{^}
Poland (ZPAV) 2008 Agora SA album reissue	3× Platinum	60,000^{*}
Spain (Promusicae)	Platinum	100,000^{^}
Switzerland (IFPI Switzerland)	2× Platinum	100,000^{^}
United Kingdom (BPI)	2× Platinum	600,000^{^}
United States (RIAA)	Gold	500,000^{^}
Yugoslavia	Gold	50,000
^{*} Sales figures based on certification alone.^{^} Shipments figures based on certification alone.^{‡} Sales+streaming figures based on certification alone.
