= Washburn RR-V Tour Series =

RR-12 Model

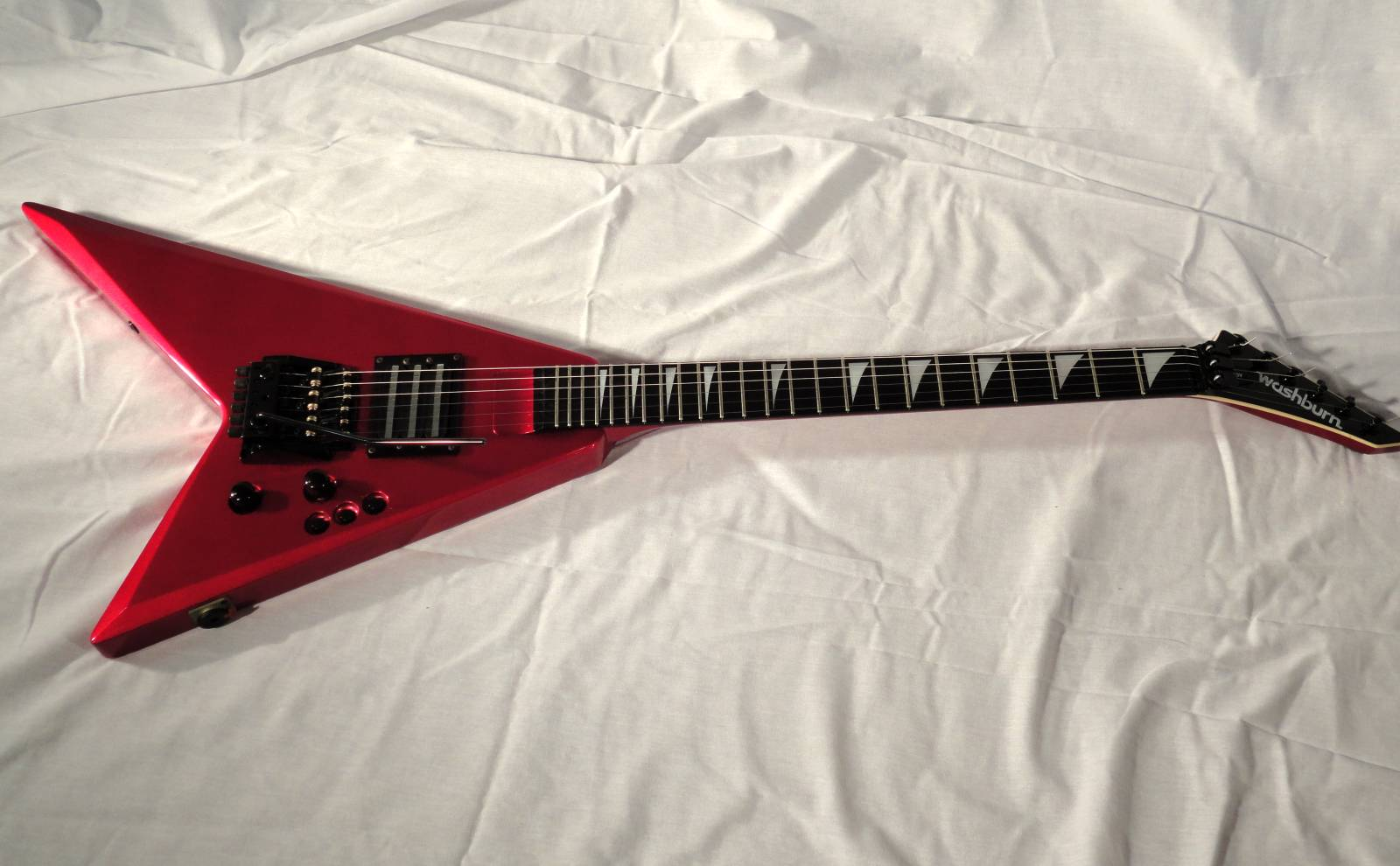

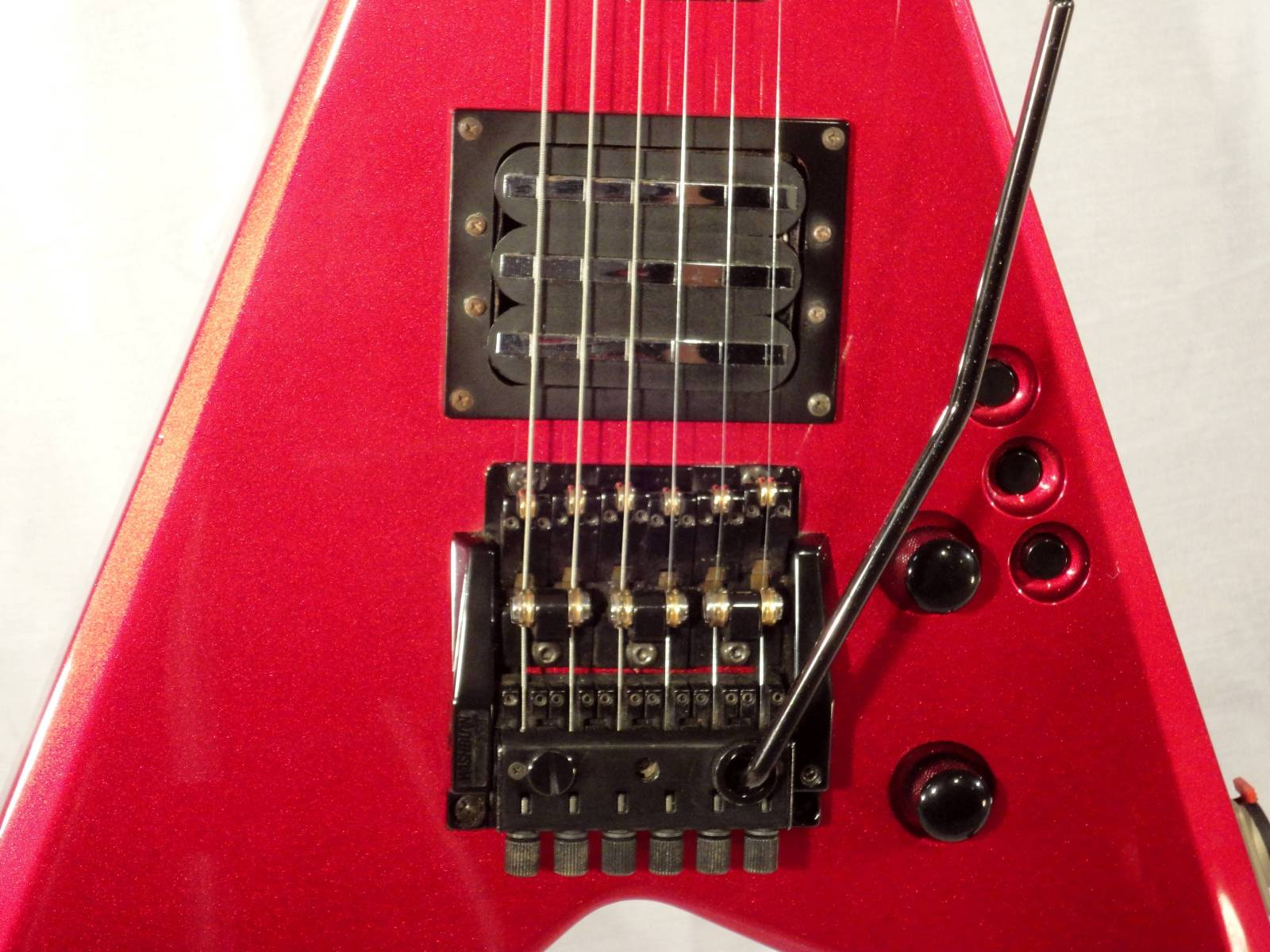

The Washburn RR-V Tour Series is a rare line of solid-bodied electric 'Flying V' shaped guitars produced by Washburn Guitars in Japan between the years of 1985 to 1987.

== Models ==
There were at least 5 models in the RR-V series. The RR-2, RR-10V, RR-11, RR-12, and RR-40 (the latter being the top-of-the-line model). All models featured a Floyd Rose Tremolo styled-bridge (called the 'Wonderbar Tremolo') and had a pickup configuration of one Humbucker at the bridge and two single-coils at the neck.

- RR-2 - Featured an Alnico split-coil humbucker, 2 single-coil pickups, 3 individual pickup selectors, and Grover machine heads. The body was available in one solid colour, most commonly black.
- RR-10 - Featured Washburn Alnico split-coil humbucker in the bridge position, 2 single-coil pickups as middle and neck, 3 individual pickup selectors and Grover machine heads with a locking nut. The body was available in solid colours.
- RR-12 - Similar to the RR-11 model. Featured an 'Invader' humbucker at the bridge. Optional on this model was a carbonite fretboard. The body was available in white with red stripes diagonally across.
- RR-40 - The top model. Featured a triple coil humbucker, polished carbonite fretboard, and beveled edge body.

== Users ==
Perhaps the most notable use of a Washburn RR Tour Series was by Brian May of Queen, who used a white Washburn RR11V in the music video for "Princes of the Universe."

Nigel Swanson of The Exploited played a custom-painted RR-2 during his time in the band, from 1985 to 1989.

Trey Azagthoth of death metal band Morbid Angel played an unspecified RR-V model during the band's early years in the 80s.
