= Essential Musicals =

Studio album by Elaine Paige
- Released: 23 October 2006
- Genre: Musical theatre
- Label: W14 Universal Music TV
- Producer: Mike Moran

Elaine Paige chronology
Centre Stage: The Very Best Of Elaine Paige (2004)	Essential Musicals (2006)	Songbook (2007)

Essential Musicals is an album by Elaine Paige, released in 2006. The album was produced by Mike Moran, vocals were recorded at Air-Edel Studios in London, and the orchestra backing recorded at The Hungarian State Radio Studios, Budapest. The album peaked at #46 in the UK Albums Chart.

It features tracks from musicals chosen from top shows as voted in a poll by Paige's BBC Radio 2 show Elaine Paige on Sunday.

== Background ==
The recording is notable for the inclusion of "You Must Love Me" and "Someone Else's Story". "You Must Love Me" was a song added to the score of Evita for the 1996 movie, performed by the character of Eva whom Paige had portrayed in the original stage production in 1978. "Someone Else's Story" was a song added to the original Broadway score of Chess for the character of Svetlana. The song proved to be a popular addition and has been included in all subsequent productions and recordings since Broadway.

There was a personal connection to Paige for many of the tracks: she appeared as an urchin in the film version of Oliver!, from which "Where is Love?" is taken; she played Sandy Dumbrowski in Grease in London prior to "Hopelessly Devoted to You" being added to the score of the show; she cites West Side Story, where "Something's Coming" features, as being influential in sparking her interest in musical theatre; she appeared in the original London production of Hair from which "Aquarius" is taken; and "Surrender" is one of Norma Desmond's songs in Sunset Boulevard. Paige had previously released recordings of all Norma's other solo songs, having played the role in London between 1994 and 1996 and then on Broadway from 1996 to 1997.

== Production ==
The album was produced by Mike Moran who had previously produced two of her other studio albums: The Queen Album (1988) and Piaf (1994).

Chris Egan, who conducted the orchestra for tracks on the album, was Paige's musical director for a number of years and later co-produced Elaine Paige Live, the live recording of her 2009 concert tour.

== Track listing ==
1. "Where is Love?" - 4.16 (Lionel Bart) - from the musical Oliver!
2. "Edelweiss" - 3.44 (Richard Rodgers/Oscar Hammerstein II) - from the musical The Sound of Music
3. "Hopelessly Devoted to You" - 3.39 (John Farrar) - from the musical Grease
4. "You Must Love Me" - 3.15 (Andrew Lloyd Webber/Tim Rice) - from the musical Evita
5. "Bring Him Home" - 3.30 (Claude-Michel Schönberg/Alain Boublil/Herbert Kretzmer) - from the musical Les Miserables
6. "Something's Coming" - 3.00 (Leonard Bernstein/Stephen Sondheim) - from the musical West Side Story
7. "If I Loved You" - 2.49 (Richard Rodgers/Oscar Hammerstein II) - from the musical Carousel
8. "All I Ask of You" - 4.20 (Andrew Lloyd Webber/Charles Hart/Richard Stilgoe) - from the musical The Phantom of the Opera
9. "Someone Else's Story" - 3.46 (Tim Rice/Benny Andersson/Björn Ulvaeus) - from the musical Chess
10. "I'm Gonna Wash That Man Right Outa My Hair" - 3.10 (Richard Rodgers/Oscar Hammerstein II) - from the musical South Pacific
11. "Aquarius" - 3.58 (Galt MacDermot/James Rado/Gerome Ragni) - from the musical Hair
12. "Surrender" - 3.15 (Andrew Lloyd Webber/Don Black/Christopher Hampton) - from the musical Sunset Boulevard
13. "Broadway Baby" - 4.39 (Stephen Sondheim) - from the musical Follies

== Personnel ==
=== Musicians ===
- Elaine Paige - vocals
- The Budapest Philharmonic Orchestra - orchestra
- Mike Moran, Chris Egan - orchestra leaders

=== Production ===
- Producers - Mike Moran
- Orchestral Recording engineer - Denes Redly & Adam Vanryne
- Recording, Mix and Mastering Engineer - Adam Vanryne
