= A Kind of Magic (song) =

1986 single by Queen

- UK single picture sleeve

Single by Queen

from the album A Kind of Magic
- B-side: "A Dozen Red Roses for My Darling" (UK); "Gimme the Prize (Kurgan's Theme)" (US)
- Released: 17 March 1986
- Genre: Synth-pop
- Length: 4:25 (7-inch album version); 3:37 (A Kind of A Kind of Magic version); 6:23 (12-inch extended version); 4:10 (original Highlander version)
- Label: EMI (UK); Capitol (US)
- Songwriter: Roger Taylor
- Producers: Queen; David Richards

Queen singles chronology
"One Vision" (1985)	"A Kind of Magic" (1986)	"Princes of the Universe" (1986)

Music video
- "A Kind of Magic" on YouTube

"A Kind of Magic" is the title track of the 1986 album of the same name by the British rock band Queen. It was written by the band's drummer, Roger Taylor, for the film Highlander and featured as the ending theme. The single reached number three in the UK Singles Chart and the top 10 in a number of European countries. The single was released on 4 June 1986 in the United States and reached number 42 on the Billboard Hot 100. The song is the opening track on the band's compilation albums Greatest Hits II and Classic Queen.

== Recording ==
=== Highlander ===
The phrase "a kind of magic" is used in Highlander by Connor MacLeod (Christopher Lambert) as a description of his immortality. Roger Taylor liked the phrase so much that he used it as inspiration for the song. There are references to the film in the lyrics: "one prize, one goal"; "no mortal man"; and "there can be only one". The single's cover art features an image of Clancy Brown in character as the film's villain, The Kurgan.

=== Composition ===
Roger Taylor wrote the song, which originally appeared in the movie Highlander. Brian May described this original version as "quite lugubrious and heavy". For the album version, Freddie Mercury created a new bass line, added instrumental breaks, and changed the song's order to make it more chart friendly. Mercury and David Richards produced this new version.

In a radio interview in September 2017, Chris Rea claimed that he performed the finger clicks with which the song opens.

== Critical reception ==
Upon its release, Howard Johnson of Kerrang! believed that "A Kind of Magic" would be a hit, but noted how, like the band's 1984 hit "Radio Ga Ga", it is "overloaded with keyboards, [leaving] poor guitarist Brian May once again reduced to a supporting role". Mike Gardner of Record Mirror remarked that the band "plod through 'Radio Ga Ga' territory without any pretensions to anything as lowly as a song". He added that it is "rescued from total evaporation by Freddie's spirited vocals and some marvellous, but all too brief, guitar pyrotechnics from Brian May". Ron Romulus of Sounds noted that the "enduring Queen produce another slick piece of cabaret and vaudeville", with Mercury "bellow[ing] bold heroics".

In the US, Cash Box commented how it "simmers and teases with tastes of classic Queen trademarks – stacked vocals and harmony lead guitar parts". Nancy Erlich, writing for Billboard, suggested that the "rolling little rhythm item" would help the band "overcome its recent career slump". The reviewer added that the "bombast level is noticeably reduced, and the beat's just right for summer". Dave Sholin of the Gavin Report also believed the song would change the band's "top 40 cold streak" and commented on how the "mercurial vocals and demon bass line showcase this exceptional Roger Taylor song". He concluded, "They've not had a song with this kind of symmetry in half a decade and, on the verge of becoming a self-parody, they pull it out of the fire".

== Music video ==
The music video for this song was directed by Russell Mulcahy, director of Highlander. Brian May did not use his famous Red Special guitar in the music video, but instead a 1984 copy. In the video, Mercury is dressed as a magician type figure. He enters an abandoned theatre (The Playhouse Theatre in London) where May, Taylor and John Deacon (all dressed as stereotypical tramps) are asleep until awakened by Mercury's entrance. Mercury transforms the hobos into the Queen members, dressed regularly with their instruments, then back to hobos again as he leaves. Throughout the video, cartoon images dance to the beat of the song which were produced by The Walt Disney Company As May later remembered, the theater was old and derelict, and lacking central heating, so the band were quite cold during the March filming.

== Live performances ==
The song was a live favourite on The Magic Tour of the same year, which proved to be Queen's last tour before the death of Freddie Mercury. Taylor often included the song in solo set lists, and those with his band The Cross. On the Rock the Cosmos Tour of Europe, Taylor took lead vocals for the song at some concerts.

== Legacy ==
The single was certified platinum in Brazil for more than 100,000 digital downloads of the single.

Queen's compilations The Platinum Collection, Classic Queen, and Greatest Hits II all make an unsubstantiated claim that the song was a number-one hit in 35 countries.

Musical theatre actress Elaine Paige recorded the song on her album of Queen covers The Queen Album in 1988.

The song serves as the theme song and title inspiration for the 2008 French animated television series A Kind of Magic.

In May 2022, South Korean boy group Enhypen was chosen as the 2022 Coke summer campaign artist for the brand's "Coke x Music. Engrave the Magic of Summer" message. The group performed the song on 8 June through Coke Studio and the result was released digitally on streaming platforms.

A cover of the song by Danna Paola, Felukah, and Tamtam was featured in the 2022 FIFA World Cup official songs with added lyrics in Spanish and Arabic.

== Personnel ==
- Freddie Mercury – lead and backing vocals, synthesizer, sampler
- Brian May – guitars, backing vocals
- Roger Taylor – drums, drum machine, backing vocals, synthesizer
- John Deacon – bass guitar
- Chris Rea – fingerclicks
- Spike Edney – synthesizer

== Charts ==
=== Weekly charts ===
Chart (1986)	Peak position
Australia (Kent Music Report)	25
Austria (Ö3 Austria Top 40)	12
Belgium (Ultratop 50 Flanders)	4
Canada Top Singles (RPM)	64
Europe (European Hot 100 Singles)	2
Finland (Suomen virallinen lista)	16
France (SNEP)	5
Ireland (IRMA)	4
Netherlands (Dutch Top 40)	4
Netherlands (Single Top 100)	5
New Zealand (Recorded Music NZ)	23
South Africa (Springbok Radio)	10
Spain (AFYVE)	8
Switzerland (Schweizer Hitparade)	4
UK Singles (Official Charts)	3
US Billboard Hot 100	42
West Germany (GfK)	6

Chart (2013)	Peak position
Slovenia (SloTop50)	32

Chart (2022)	Peak position
Poland Airplay (ZPAV)	87

=== Year-end charts ===
Chart (1986)	Position
Belgium (Ultratop)	38
Europe (European Hot 100 Singles)	6
Netherlands (Dutch Top 40)	21
Netherlands (Single Top 100)	35
Switzerland (Schweizer Hitparade)	17
UK Singles (OCC)	32
West Germany (Media Control)	24

== Certifications and sales ==
Region	Certification	Certified units/sales
Brazil (Pro-Música Brasil)	Platinum	60,000^{*}
Denmark (IFPI Danmark)	Gold	45,000^{‡}
Italy (FIMI) sales since 2009	Gold	25,000^{‡}
New Zealand (RMNZ)	Platinum	30,000^{‡}
Spain (Promusicae)	Gold	30,000^{‡}
United Kingdom (BPI) sales since 2011	Platinum	600,000^{‡}
^{*} Sales figures based on certification alone.^{‡} Sales+streaming figures based on certification alone.
