= Roggel =

Roggel Rogkel (Limburgish)
- Village
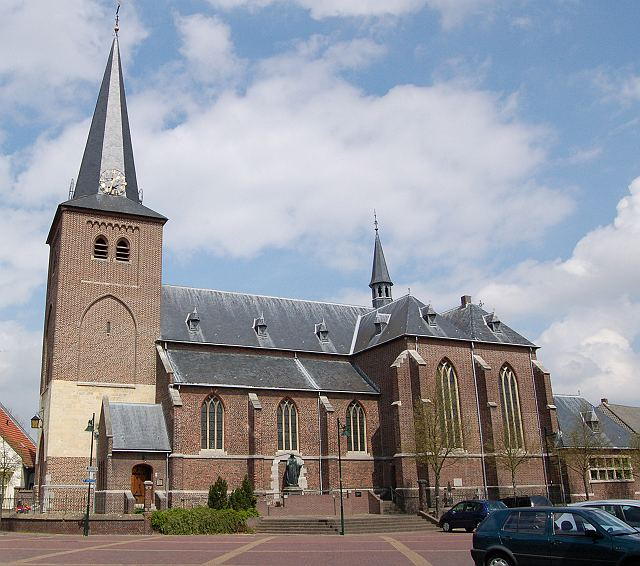
- The Sint-Petruskerk (Roggel)

- Coat of arms

- Location in the Netherlands Location in the province of Limburg in the Netherlands
- Coordinates: 51°15′45″N 5°55′25″E
- Country: Netherlands
- Province: Limburg
- Municipality: Leudal

Area
  - Total: 16.04 km^{2} (6.19 sq mi)
- Elevation: 29 m (95 ft)

Population (2021)
  - Total: 4,295
  - Density: 267.8/km^{2} (693.5/sq mi)
- Time zone: UTC+1 (CET)
  - Summer (DST): UTC+2 (CEST)
- Postal code: 6088
- Dialing code: 0475
- Major roads: N279

Roggel (Limburgish: Rogkel) is a village in the Dutch province of Limburg. It is located in the municipality of Leudal.

== History ==
The village was first mentioned in 1230 as Rogle. The etymology is unclear. Roggel developed along the Roggelse Beek. It used to part of the County of Horne. Later it became it part of the Prince-Bishopric of Liège. In 1679, it became an independent heerlijkheid.

The Catholic St Peter Church is a three aisled church which was built in 1477 to replace the 13th century chapel. The latest extension was in 1929. In 1944, the tower was partially blown up and rebuilt in 1946.

Rogger was home to 281 people in 1840. The grist mill Sint-Pieter was built in 1901. After 1953, the mill went out of service. It was sold to the municipality in 1969, and restored in 1976. The wind mill is often in service.

The former municipality of Roggel merged in 1991 with Neer. The new municipality was initially named "Roggel", but changed its name to Roggel en Neer in 1993. In 2007 Roggel en Neer became part of the new municipality of Leudal.

== Gallery ==
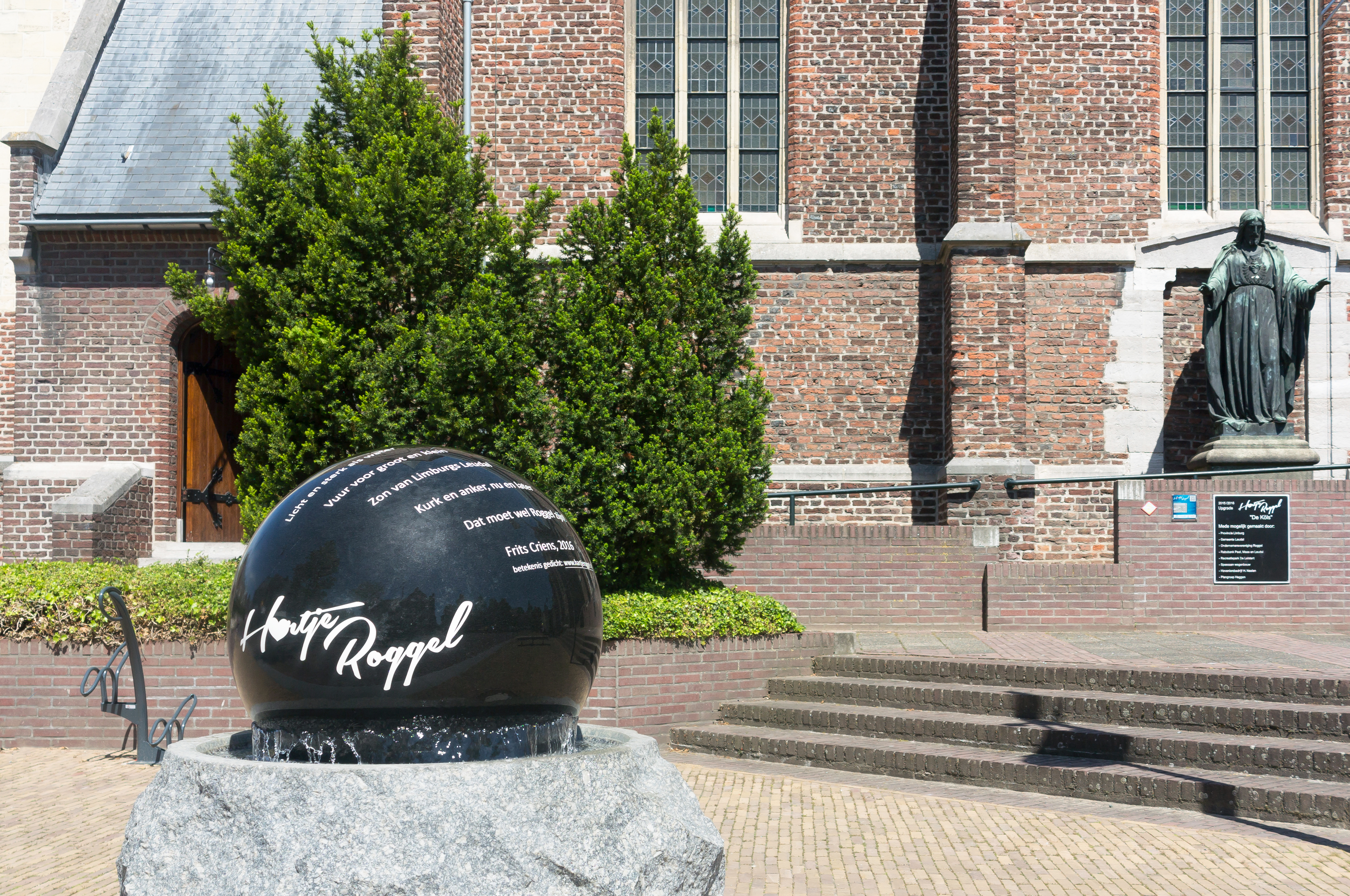
Sculpture: de Roggelse waterbol

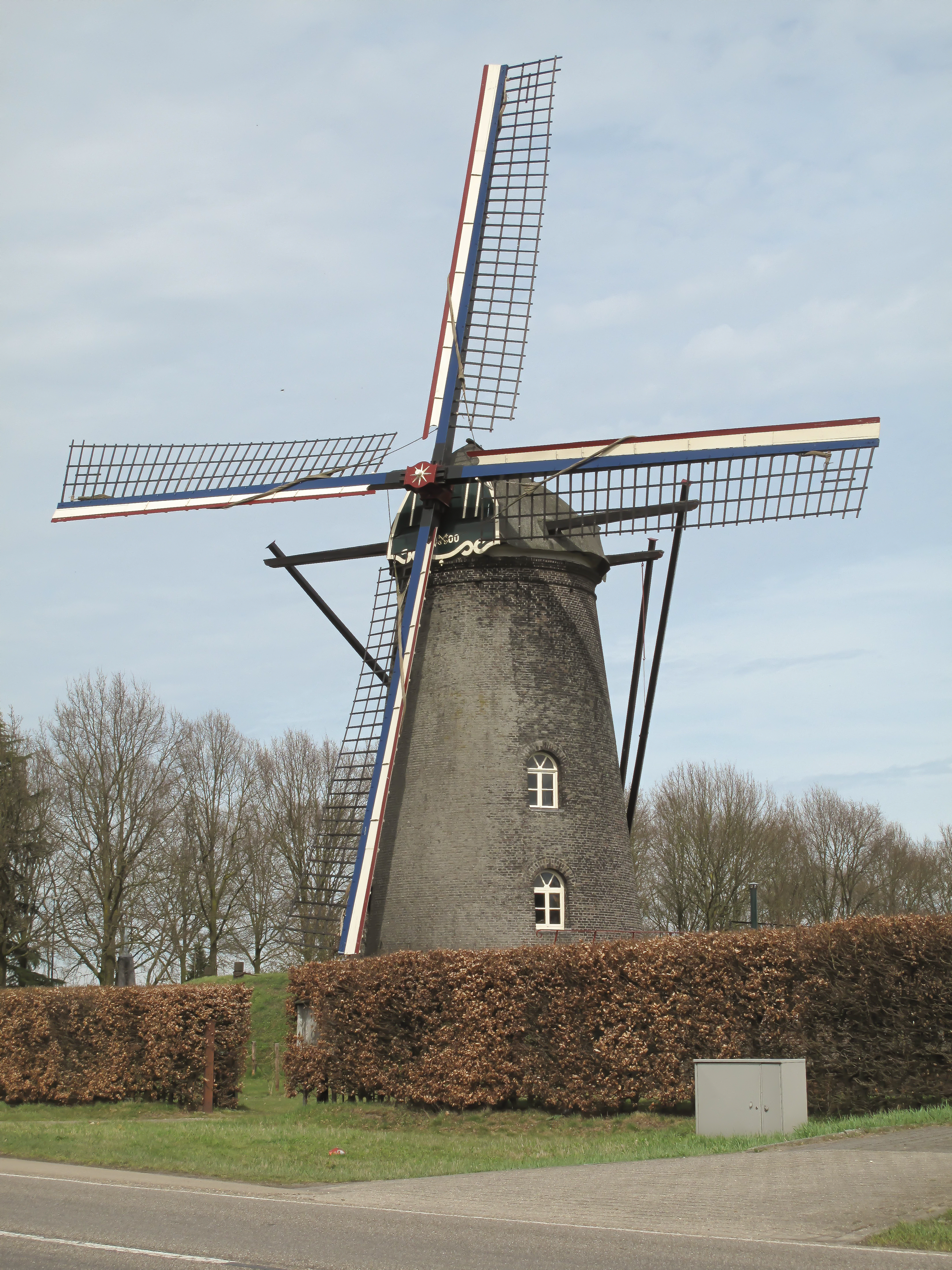
Nijken, windmill: de Sint-Petrus
