= Highlander (film) =

1986 fantasy film by Russell Mulcahy

- Theatrical release poster
- Directed by: Russell Mulcahy
- Screenplay by: Gregory Widen; Peter Bellwood; Larry Ferguson
- Story by: Gregory Widen
- Produced by: Peter S. Davis; William N. Panzer
- Starring: Christopher Lambert; Roxanne Hart; Clancy Brown; Sean Connery
- Cinematography: Gerry Fisher
- Edited by: Peter Honess
- Music by: Michael Kamen
- Production companies: Highlander Productions; Davis-Panzer Productions
- Distributed by: 20th Century Fox (United States); Thorn EMI Screen Entertainment (through Columbia-Cannon-Warner Distributors) (United Kingdom)
- Release dates: January 1986 (Avoriaz); March 7, 1986 (United States); August 29, 1986 (United Kingdom)
- Running time: 111 minutes
- Countries: United Kingdom; United States
- Language: English
- Budget: $19 million
- Box office: $12.8 million

Highlander is a 1986 fantasy action-adventure film and the first installment in the Highlander franchise. It follows Connor MacLeod, a Scottish Highlander who discovers he is immortal and, after centuries of clandestine duels, confronts his ultimate rival in contemporary New York. It stars Christopher Lambert as MacLeod and also features Roxanne Hart, Clancy Brown, and Sean Connery. It is directed by Russell Mulcahy from a screenplay by Gregory Widen, Peter Bellwood, and Larry Ferguson.

Highlander was a commercial failure on its initial theatrical release, grossing only a little less than $13 million worldwide against a production budget of $19 million, while receiving mixed reviews. Nevertheless, it became a cult film and inspired several film sequels and television spin-offs. British rock band Queen recorded several songs for the film's soundtrack, and those songs also appeared on their 1986 studio album, A Kind of Magic. Another Queen song, "Hammer to Fall", is also used in the film, although it was recorded for the band's previous studio album, The Works. One of the songs from A Kind of Magic, "Princes of the Universe", was also used for the title sequence in the television series. The tagline, "There can be only one", has carried on into pop culture.

== Plot ==
In 1985 New York, Connor MacLeod encounters an old enemy, Iman Fasil, in the parking garage of Madison Square Garden. After a sword duel, Connor beheads Fasil and absorbs a powerful release of energy from his body, then hides his sword in the garage's ceiling. NYPD officers detain him on suspicion of murder but lack evidence to hold him.

Connor's history is revealed through a series of flashbacks. In the Scottish Highlands in 1536, Connor fights against the rival Fraser clan as a warrior of the MacLeod clan. The Frasers are aided by an outlander knight in exchange for his right to slay Connor. In battle, the knight fatally stabs Connor but is driven off by his clansmen. After Connor makes a complete recovery, his lover Kate and his cousin Dougal accuse him of witchcraft. The clan wants to kill him, but his other cousin, chieftain Angus, mercifully exiles him. Connor quietly settles into a new life as a blacksmith and marries a woman named Heather MacDonald.

Juan Sánchez-Villalobos Ramírez, a wandering swordsman, seeks out Connor. He explains that they and others like them are "Immortals". They possess a sixth sense known as the "quickening" and can be killed only by beheading. Each immortal must be ready to do battle with others, save on holy ground. Ramírez trains Connor in sword fighting and the two become friends. He informs Connor that as the number of immortals dwindles, they will gather in a distant land for a final confrontation until only one remains with the combined quickening of all. Immortals cannot conceive children, and Ramírez urges Connor to leave Heather so that he will be unburdened in the fight ahead. The knight that he encountered, the Kurgan, is a powerful and vicious immortal who would subject humanity to an eternity of darkness.

One night while Connor is away, the Kurgan finds Ramírez at his home with Heather and decapitates him in a duel. Connor stays with Heather until she dies of old age, leaving him heartbroken. He adopts Ramírez's katana as his own and spends the next few centuries wandering the Earth.

In 1985, the Gathering approaches, and the Kurgan comes to New York, where Connor deals antiques under the alias "Russell Nash", assisted by his confidant and adopted daughter Rachel Ellenstein. Brenda Wyatt, a metallurgy expert working for the police as a forensic scientist, finds shards of Connor's sword at Fasil's death scene and is puzzled that the sword smithing techniques do not match the age of the blade. She follows Connor for clues and witnesses the Kurgan attacking him. The police arrive, forcing them to flee. She meets with Connor twice afterward, hoping to learn about the paradoxical sword. Connor likes her but tells her to leave him alone.

The Kurgan duels and beheads Sunda Kastagir, another immortal. A witness to the fight gives the NYPD a description of him. Brenda investigates Connor and finds evidence that he has lived for centuries. On Heather's birthday, Connor lights a candle for her in a church as he has done every year. The Kurgan arrives and confirms that he and Connor are now the last remaining immortals and also reveals he raped Heather after killing Ramírez. Disgusted, but prohibited from fighting on holy ground, Connor leaves.

Brenda confronts Connor, who explains his true identity. After spending the night together, they part company, but the Kurgan finds out about their newfound intimacy and kidnaps Brenda to draw Connor out. Connor decides to leave behind the Russell Nash identity, says goodbye to Rachel, and confronts the Kurgan at Silvercup Studios in Queens, rescuing Brenda in the process. After a long duel, Connor outfights and decapitates the Kurgan, absorbing his power. Connor returns to Scotland with Brenda and reveals that he is now a mortal man who can age and have children. He is also able to read the thoughts and feelings of people all around the world, and remembering Ramírez's lessons, he hopes to encourage cooperation, understanding, and peace among humanity.

== Cast ==
- Christopher Lambert as Connor MacLeod (The Highlander), a 16th-century immortal born in Glenfinnan, Scotland, near the shores of Loch Shiel. Under the alias Russell Nash, he lives and works as an antique dealer in New York in 1985.
- Sean Connery as Juan Sánchez-Villalobos Ramírez, an Egyptian immortal who has lived for centuries in both Japan and later Spain. A highly adept swordsman, he seeks out Connor and insists on taking him on as his pupil to defeat the Kurgan, knowing that he must not win "The Prize".
- Clancy Brown as The Kurgan, Connor's nemesis, said to be the last of the Kurgan tribe and a sadistic, murderously brutal barbarian. In 1985, he travels to New York under the name "Victor Kruger", intending to kill the few remaining immortals and claim "The Prize".
- Roxanne Hart as Brenda Wyatt, a forensic scientist and published metallurgy expert helping to investigate the string of beheadings in New York City.
- Beatie Edney as Heather MacLeod, Connor's first wife. After Connor is banished from his village, he starts a new life with her. She lives with the eternally youthful Connor for many years until she dies of old age.
- Alan North as Lieutenant Frank Moran, Brenda's colleague in the NYPD.
- Jon Polito as Detective Walter Bedsoe, an NYPD detective working alongside Moran.
- Sheila Gish as Rachel Ellenstein, Connor's middle-aged secretary and adopted daughter. Saved from the Nazis by Connor when she was a Jewish child during the Holocaust, Rachel is one of the few mortal people who know his true identity.
  - Nicola Ramsey as a young Rachel.
- Hugh Quarshie as Sunda Kastagir, Connor's fellow immortal and friend. He is beheaded by the Kurgan during a battle in New York.
- Christopher Malcolm as Kirk Matunas, a Vietnam War US Marine Corps veteran who witnesses the duel between the Kurgan and Kastagir, shoots the Kurgan, and is then impaled on the villain's sword, but survives to provide a description.
- Peter Diamond as Iman Fasil, a French immortal. He attacks Connor before the Highlander can have a chance to draw his own sword. Despite this, Connor defeats and beheads him. Diamond was also the film's stunt coordinator.
- Celia Imrie as Kate MacLeod, Connor's lover in 1536, before he met Heather. Convinced Connor's immortality means he is "in league with Lucifer", Kate leads an unsuccessful effort to have him burned at the stake.
- Billy Hartman and James Cosmo as Dougal and Angus MacLeod, Connor's cousins and leaders of the MacLeod clan.

Other actors in the film include Edward Wiley as Garfield, an NYPD officer who is correct in suspecting Nash as a possible perp in the homicide of Fasil; Corinne Russell as Candy, a prostitute hired by the Kurgan; Jimmy McKenna as Father Rainey; Alistair Findlay as Murdoch of Clan Fraser; Ian Reddington as Bassett; Sion Tudor Owen as Hotchkiss; Damien Leake as Tony; Richard Bonehill as Buck the hotel clerk; and Gordon Sterne as Dr. Kenderly.

Professional wrestlers Greg Gagne, Jim Brunzell, Sam Fatu, Michael Hayes, Terry Gordy, and Buddy Roberts appear as themselves in the film's opening sequence at a tag-team match. The event in the film is supposedly held at Madison Square Garden, but was actually shot at Brendan Byrne Arena in New Jersey.

== Production and development ==
=== Conception ===
Gregory Widen wrote the script for Highlander, as a class assignment while he was an undergraduate in the screenwriting program at UCLA, then under the title of Shadow Clan. Widen drew inspiration from Ridley Scott's 1977 film The Duellists, centering on the brutal decades-long feud between two swordsmen. After reading the script, Widen's instructor advised him to send it to an agent. Widen optioned the rights to Bill Panzer and Peter Davis for $1,500 in 1982 (equivalent to $5,004 in 2025), with continuing yearly payments to maintain the rights. It became the first draft of what would eventually be the screenplay for the film, which was eventually sold to Thorn EMI in 1984 for £250,000 (equivalent to £839,879.15 or US$1.07 million in 2024).

According to Widen, "The idea of the story was basically a combination of a riff on The Duellists—guy wants to finish a duel over years—and a visit I made both to Scotland and the Tower of London armour display, where I thought, 'What if you owned all this? What if you'd worn it all through history and were giving someone a tour of your life through it?' That scene is basically in the movie."

According to William Panzer, producer of Highlander: The Series, "And that's where everything fell into place—the idea that there are Immortals and they were in conflict with each other, leading secret lives that the rest of us are unaware of."

In a 2006 interview with The Action Elite, Gregory Widen remarked, "I've always been amazed that a project I wrote as a UCLA student has had this kind of life. I think its appeal is the uniqueness of how the story was told and the fact it had a heart and a point of view about immortality."

=== Writing and development ===
Widen's original draft of the script differed significantly from the film. The initial story was darker and more violent. Connor is born in 1408 rather than 1518. He lives with his mother and father and a younger brother. Heather does not exist; Connor is promised to a girl named Mara, who rejects him when she learns that he is immortal. Connor willingly leaves his village after his clan's attitude towards him changes, instead of being banished. His alias is Richard Taupin and his weapon is a custom broadsword. Ramírez is a Spaniard born in 1100, instead of an ancient Egyptian born more than two thousand years earlier. The Kurgan is known as the Knight, using the alias Carl William Smith. He is not a savage, but a cold-blooded killer. Brenda is Brenna Cartwright, a historian at the Smithsonian who sometimes helps the police.

Other elements were changed during the rewrite. Initially, immortals could have children; in the draft Connor is said to have had 37. In a flashback in the first draft, Connor attends the funeral of one of his sons. His wife (in her 70s) and his two sons, who are in their mid 50s, see him revealed as an immortal. In the early draft, there is no release of energy when an immortal kills another nor is there any mention of the Prize. Immortals can still sense each other and, when Connor finally kills the Knight, he feels a sharp burning pain. As he senses another immortal nearby, the ending implies this is simply one of many battles as the Game continues.

Director Russell Mulcahy was flipping through a magazine and saw a photograph of Christopher Lambert from his recent role as the title hero of Greystoke: The Legend of Tarzan, Lord of the Apes. At the Neuchâtel International Fantastic Film Festival in 2015, Mulcahy said he showed the photo to his production staff and "I said, 'who's this?' They had no idea. He couldn't speak English. But he had the perfect look. And he learned English very fast." Mulcahy originally considered Kurt Russell or Mickey Rourke for the role of Connor MacLeod.

Widen had originally envisioned Connor as a very serious, grim character following centuries of violence and loss. The film portrayed MacLeod as a person who has suffered loss and fears new attachment, but doesn't deny the possibility of love, maintains a sense of humor about life, and tells his adopted daughter to have hope and remain optimistic. In a 2016 interview with HeyUGuys, Lambert said part of what he found appealing about Connor MacLeod was the man still having humor and hope despite his long life and many losses. "It's the only role that I have played that is touching on the subject of immortality, through a character carrying five hundred years of violence, pain, love, and suffering on his shoulders, who is still walking around and being positive. That is what amazed me about him the most...it's difficult living through one life but to see all the people around you dying over and over. How do you cope with that pain? How do you have the strength to keep on walking, to keep being positive and optimistic? To be capable of falling in love again when you know the pain it creates when you lose them."

Widen also had a different vision of the Kurgan originally. "Kurgan was the thing that was most different about my screenplay. He was much more tortured. The Kurgan in Highlander as it is pretty much like Freddy – he's just a cackling psychopath. I envisaged him as a guy who loses everything over time. The only thing he could hold onto, to give him a reason to get up in the morning, was to finish this thing – finish it with our guy [MacLeod]. It was more about that ...it was just a reason to get up in the morning. Otherwise, what is the point? Everything is impermanent, everything is lost. That made him much more serious – in a weird way, a sympathetic bad guy." Widen commented that actor Clancy Brown had similar thoughts about the Kurgan, wishing to make him more complex and interesting by dressing the villain in a bowler hat and suit, disguising his villainy rather than wearing the biker outfit he had instead.

=== Casting ===
As the film readied for production, Kurt Russell was approached for the role of Connor Macleod but ultimately turned it down, according to Mulcahy at the insistence of Goldie Hawn. Arnold Schwarzenegger was considered for the role of the Kurgan.

=== Filming ===
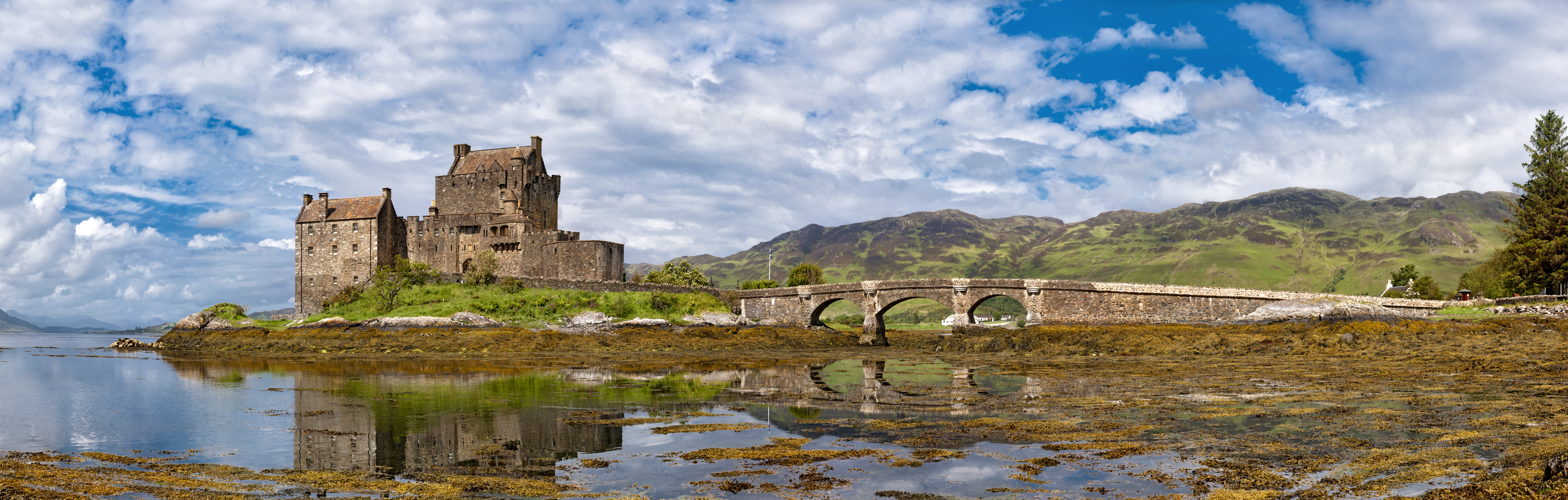
Scotland's Eilean Donan Castle and its bridge featured prominently in the film

The budget was put up by Thorn EMI. When brought to Russell Mulcahy, the title was The Dark Knight. Filming took place in Scotland, England, Wales and New York City.

Director Russell Mulcahy filmed Highlander using music video techniques including fast cutting and pacy music.

In preparation, actor Christopher Lambert spent months working four hours each morning with a dialect coach and four hours in the afternoons sword training with former Olympic fencer Bob Anderson, who had been a Darth Vader stunt double in the Star Wars franchise.

On filming a scene underwater in a Scottish loch, Lambert said, "The first time it's a surprise. I thought the water would be cold, but not that cold. The second time you know it is going to be freezing. The third time you turn away and you say, 'That's the last take you're doing.'" Director of photography Arthur Smith actually filmed the scene in which fish fall out of MacLeod's kilt, but Lambert's kilt proved to be too short. Smith said, "I stuck part of a drain pipe above Chris's kilt out of camera range, and fed live trout down the tube."

Smith also had difficulties shooting MacLeod meeting the Kurgan. It was raining that day and the crew had to use umbrellas and hair dryers to prevent water from hitting the camera lenses and appearing on the film. Smith also remembered that Lambert, who was near-sighted, "kept forgetting to take off his glasses as he came over the hill on his horse."

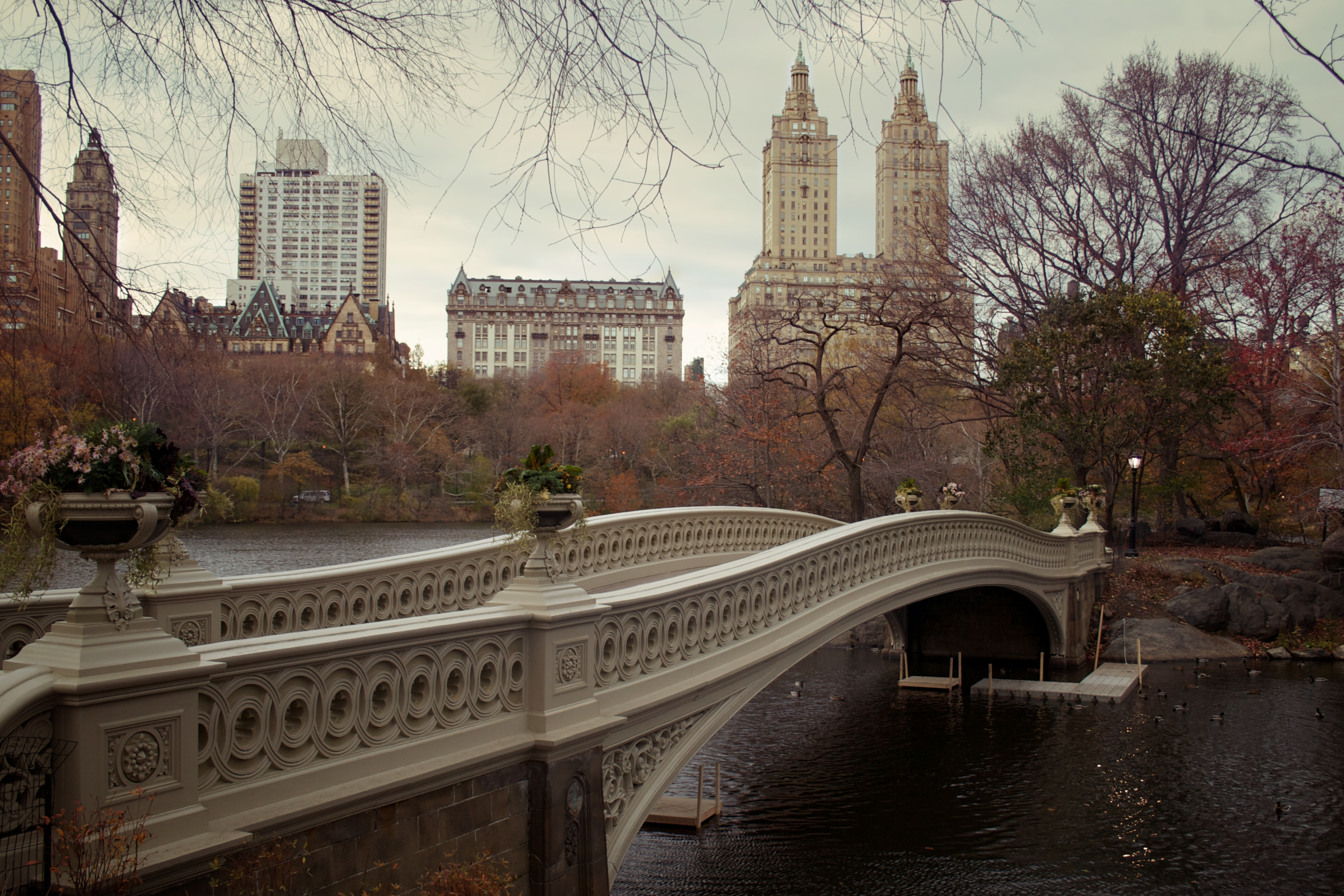
Bow Bridge in Central Park

The filming of the parking garage scene took place in two different places. According to New York location manager Brett Botula, "the garage exterior is Manhattan, across from Madison Square Garden, and the interior is 'somewhere in London.'" The pro-wrestling match in the opening scene featured The Fabulous Freebirds vs. Greg Gagne, Jim Brunzell and The Tonga Kid.

The scene in which the MacLeod clan sets off to battle is supposed to take place "in the village of Glenfinnan, on the shore of Loch Shiel" in the Lochaber area, but was actually filmed at Eilean Donan Castle, which is in the same general area but is really on the shore of Loch Duich, a sea loch near Kyle of Lochalsh and the Isle of Skye.

According to the DVD commentary, the film's climax was originally intended to take place on top of the Statue of Liberty. Then it was changed to an amusement park and finally changed to the rooftop of the Silvercup Studios building. The opening sequence was originally intended to take place during a National Hockey League game, but the NHL refused because the film crew intended to emphasize the violence of the match.

The scene in the alley where the Kurgan beheads Kastagir and stabs the former marine, followed by an explosion, was filmed in an alley in England even though it was set in New York.

The opening voice-over by Connery has an echo effect because it was recorded in the bathroom of his Spanish villa, where he had been working on his Spanish accent for the film with a voice coach. It was played for the producers over the phone, and they approved of it because they could not discern the quality of the recording.

In a Reddit "Ask Me Anything" session in 2014, Clancy Brown said "It was a strange set. We were all trying to make a good movie, and the producers were trying to make money any way they could, so there were a lot of things we had to work around, do on the cheap because of those producers."

As an example of the lengths to which the producers were prepared to go to save production costs, they initially decided on the first day of filming that the extras would not receive breakfast. The crew threatened to leave, but only when one of the assistant directors threatened to bring in Connery to force the issue did the producers back down. The tension also led the largely Scottish extras to burn then-Prime Minister Margaret Thatcher in effigy.

== Deleted scenes ==
There were a number of alternate and deleted scenes that were cut from the film and ended up being destroyed in a fire. Among these included:

- A duel between the Kurgan and an Asian Immortal named Yung Dol Kim (played by Sumar Khan). The fight takes place in an office building, with Kim wielding two swords against the Kurgan's one. Finally Kim drops his swords and falls to his knees, and tells the Kurgan that after 400 years he is tired and desires peace in death. The Kurgan beheads him. British-Chinese actor David Yip was originally cast as Kim, but was replaced before shooting started; the size difference meant that Khan had to shoot the fight scene without padding.
- A scene where Connor and Kastagir are at a nightclub for one last night of fun. They are then joined by Detective Bedsoe.
- A bedroom scene set after the sex scene where Connor shows Brenda his katana.
- The final scene between Connor and Rachel before he goes to face the Kurgan was much longer.
- A scene set after Connor's showdown with the Kurgan had Rachel burning down Connor's antique store and home. Moran arrives to tell her about the killing. Moran sees a silver picture frame she is holding of her when she was a child and Connor. Moran is confused about the picture and then Rachel takes his arm and asks him if she would have coffee with her, which he accepts and the two leave with Rachel telling him that she would explain everything.
- A scene where three UPS men arrive at Bedsoe's home to deliver Connor's fish tank.

== Soundtrack ==
The Highlander original orchestral score was composed by Michael Kamen. The British rock band Marillion turned down the chance to record the soundtrack because they were on a world tour, a missed opportunity which guitarist Steve Rothery later said he regretted. The band's Scottish lead singer, Fish, had also accepted a part in the film, but pulled out because of the scheduling conflict. Duran Duran were considered to do the soundtrack for the film. The eventual soundtrack includes several songs by Queen, such as "A Kind of Magic" and "Princes of the Universe" (the latter also being used for the Highlander television series title sequence). Brian May was inspired to write "Who Wants to Live Forever" after watching the love scenes between Connor and his wife Heather, and the song ultimately accompanied the film.

Despite a mention in the end credits, to date a complete soundtrack album for Highlander has not been released. Queen's 1986 album A Kind of Magic features several songs from the film (although sometimes in different arrangements): "Princes of the Universe", "Gimme the Prize (Kurgan's Theme)" (the album version includes snippets of dialogue from the film), "One Year of Love", "Don't Lose Your Head", "Who Wants to Live Forever", and "A Kind of Magic". The album and single edits of "A Kind of Magic" feature a different mix from the one in the film; a 2011 re-release of the album includes the long-unreleased Highlander version of the song. The album does not include Queen's recording of "Theme from New York, New York", which features briefly in Highlander. "Hammer to Fall", a Queen song heard playing from a car radio in one scene, was from an earlier album, The Works.

The 1995 CD Highlander: The Original Scores includes five cues from Kamen's Highlander score (along with seven cues from Stewart Copeland's Highlander II score and four cues from J. Peter Robinson's Highlander III score). Furthermore, a rearrangement of an excerpt from Kamen's score (specifically, the beginning of the track "The Quickening") was eventually used as the logo music for New Line Cinema's ident between 1994 and 2011.

== Release ==
Highlander premiered at the Avoriaz Fantasy Film Festival in January 1986 as the non-competitive closing film. It opened in Los Angeles on March 7, 1986. The film had a 116-minute running time in the United Kingdom and a 111-minute running time in the United States. Roughly eight minutes of footage was cut from the film for its U.S. theatrical release. Most of the cuts were sequences involving a specifically European brand of humor which the distributors thought American audiences would not find funny, such as Connor being repeatedly head-butted by one of his clansmen, the duelist shooting his assistant, and the Kurgan licking the priest's hand. The cut Mulcahy found most objectionable was the deletion of the scene showing how Connor met Rachel, because he could see no reason for its removal and believed that the relationship between Connor and Rachel was incomprehensible without it.

=== Box office ===
The film grossed $2.4 million on its opening weekend in the United States and ended with $5.9 million in the United States and Canada. In the UK, the film grossed £147,753 in its opening weekend. Internationally, the film grossed $12.9 million. Upon initial U.S. release, Highlander was not well received, but it gained wide and persistent popularity in Europe and other markets, as well as on home video. It has since become a cult film in both domestic and non-domestic markets, leading to four sequels, a television series, and various other spin-offs.

=== Home media ===
The video was a hit in the United States. Released on VHS by HBO/Cannon Video in 1986. Re-released on VHS by Republic Home Entertainment in 1993. The theatrical release of Highlander II: The Quickening in 1991 significantly increased the rental activity on Highlander even though the sequel was not a box-office success. Highlander was first released to DVD in the United States in 1997, in a "10th Anniversary Edition" Director's Cut that contained the international uncut version of the film. A "15th Anniversary" edition was released in Australia in 2001, which also contained the International cut of the film.

Highlander was again released in 2002 in two editions: a special "Immortal Edition" with several extra features (including three Queen music videos and a bonus CD containing three Queen songs from the film) and a standard edition, both of which are THX certified and contain the International uncut version with remastered video and DTS ES sound. On June 17, 2009, French distributor StudioCanal issued the film on Blu-ray with identical releases following in Germany, UK, Holland, Australia and Japan. The U.S. director's cut is available on DVD and Blu-ray in North America from Lionsgate Studios under license from the film's current owner, StudioCanal, while television rights stand with The Walt Disney Company, parent company of theatrical distributor 20th Century Studios.

An Ultimate release of the movie was rereleased in France and Europe on April 10, 2012.

In 2022, StudioCanal released a 4K & Blu-ray double disc set in the UK on October 31, November 2 in Australia & New Zealand, and November 22 in France in standard and limited collectors edition formats. The 4K disc contained new special features such as a featurette on the soundtrack, an interview with photographer David James, a featurette with Clancy Brown, a look back on the magic of Highlander, and a new audio commentary by author Jonathan Melville as well as the original commentary by director Mulcahy, and producers Panzer and Davis, whereas the Blu-ray disc contained the original Blu-ray release's extras.

== Reception ==
=== Initial critical response ===
On Metacritic, which collected initial reviews, the film has a weighted average score of 24 out of 100 based on 7 critics, indicating "generally unfavorable" reviews. Variety stated that there were "entertaining moments" but the "total work is a mess". People described it as "a moody combination of Blade Runner, The Terminator and your last really good nightmare". Alex Stewart reviewed Highlander for White Dwarf #79 and stated, "What the film does have going for it is stylish direction, a breathless pace and some exquisite camerawork. The performances aren't bad either, especially Brown and Connery, who are so far over the top they're practically in the next trench." Stewart reviewed the British release print of Highlander for White Dwarf #81, and stated that "Highlander is visually stunning, from the timeless grandeur of the Scottish landscape to the surrealist urban jungles of New York. And the swordfights are terrific."

John Nubbin reviewed Highlander for Different Worlds magazine and stated that "Lambert, Mulcahy, and all of the people involved with this film have poured all of their talent into its making, and it shows. There are no flaws in the special effects, the photography, the rapid transitions, etc. It is a flowing masterpiece with but one problem - after it was finished, some heavy-handed, second guessing editing was added, which bruised, but did not break, a number of scenes."

=== Critical reassessment ===
On Rotten Tomatoes, 70% of 42 reviews are positive. The site's critical consensus reads, "People hate Highlander because it's cheesy, bombastic, and absurd. And people love it for the same reasons." Audiences surveyed by CinemaScore gave the film a grade "C+" on scale of A to F.

In 1998, Halliwell's Film Guide described Highlander as a "muddled, violent and noisy fantasy" and stated that "the explanation doesn't come until most people will have given up." In 2000, Matt Ford of the BBC gave the film three stars out of five, writing, "From the moody, rain-soaked, noir-ish streets of late 20th century America to the wild open spaces of medieval Scotland, Mulcahy plunders movie history to set off his visceral fight scenes with suitably rugged locations. ... What the film loses through ham acting, weak narrative, and pompous macho posturing it more than compensates with in sheer fiery bravado, pace, and larger than life action." Also in 2000, IGN, awarding it eight out of ten, wrote, "This 80s classic has a lot going for it. The hardcore MTV manner in which it was filmed is common these days, but was groundbreaking then. This movie features some of the best scene transitions committed to celluloid. ... To this is added some fun performances by Connery and especially Clancy Brown." In 2000, Christopher Null of FilmCritic.com gave the film four-and-a-half stars out of five, writing, "Highlander has no equal among sword-and-sorcery flicks." Null later called Highlander "the greatest action film ever made," saying that it features "awesome swordfights, an awesome score, and a time-bending plotline that only a philistine could dislike".

In 2002, giving the film three stars out of five, Adam Tyner of DVD Talk wrote, "The screenplay spots a number of intelligent, creative ideas, and I find the very concept of displacing the sword-and-sorcery genre to then-modern-day New York City to be fairly inventive. The dialogue and performances don't quite match many of the film's concepts, though. The tone seems somewhat uneven as if Highlander is unsure if it wants to be seen as a straight adventure epic or if it's a campy action flick." In his 2009 Movie Guide, Leonard Maltin gave the film one-and-a-half stars out of four, describing it as an "interesting notion made silly and boring", but acknowledged that "Connery, at least, shows some style." He added that "former rock video director Mulcahy's relentlessly showy camera moves may cause you to reach for the Dramamine." Tom Hutchinson of Radio Times awarded it three stars out of five, calling it "so confused as to be hilariously watchable". Hutchinson praised "some great sword-lunging duels – the best of which is set in a Madison Square Garden garage – but the story is never that engaging."

== Legacy ==
=== Novelization ===
A novelization of the film was written by Garry Kilworth under the pen name "Garry Douglas." It expanded the events of the movie by revealing details such as Heather finding out about Connor's immortality from Ramírez, the Kurgan's First Death, and the villain's training with an Arabian immortal known as "The Bedouin" (whom he eventually kills). The novel depicts the Kurgan battling and defeating an immortal Mongol warrior soon before meeting MacLeod in 1536. Another scene reveals how he acquires his customised longsword.

The novel depicts Connor and Kastagir as having a more somber relationship, the two comfortable talking and confiding in each other about their fears. An alternate scene has them meet in the subway before going to the Bridge.

The book expands the ending following Connor's last battle with the Kurgan. He returns to his antique shop to say a final goodbye to Rachel before leaving for Scotland. Once there, he and Brenda tour the country for two months then open an antique shop in Camden Alley. On one occasion, Connor returns to the Scottish Uplands alone and stares at the remnants of his home with Rachel. There is no croft there but he finds a few stones from the fallen tor and locates the burial place of Ramírez and Heather. Finding two timbers and fashioning a crude cross, Connor tells Heather that she would like Brenda because "she is much like you."

=== Sequels ===
The film was followed by two direct sequels. Highlander II: The Quickening was released in 1991 and met with an overall negative response, with some considering it among the worst films ever made. Highlander III: The Sorcerer (also known as Highlander: The Final Dimension) was released in 1994 and retroactively erased the canon of Highlander II, acting as an alternate sequel to the first film. The movies Highlander: Endgame (2000) and Highlander: The Source (2007) follow the continuity of the TV show Highlander: The Series. Both movies received negative reviews from fans of both the original film and the TV show. The anime movie Highlander: The Search for Vengeance (2007), which existed in its own continuity with protagonist Colin MacLeod, received largely positive reviews.

=== TV series ===
Christopher Lambert was offered a chance to return as Connor MacLeod in a TV series adaptation. Lambert turned down the role, so the series became a spin-off, introducing a new character, Duncan MacLeod, played by Adrian Paul. Highlander: The Series began airing on television in 1992, with Lambert appearing as Connor in the first episode. The series explains Duncan is a man born decades after Connor's banishment and adopted by the Clan MacLeod. After Duncan discovers he is immortal, Connor finds him and trains him before going his separate way. The season two premiere episode "The Watchers" confirms Connor's battle with the Kurgan still happened in 1985 in the canon of the show, but the Prize was not won because there were still several living immortals in this version of events, including Duncan. Lambert did not appear in any other episode, but he and Duncan meet again in the movie Highlander: Endgame.

Highlander: The Animated Series aired 1994 to 1996. A loose science fiction adaptation and sequel of the original film, the series imagines a meteorite causing an apocalypse on Earth. In the wake of this, Connor MacLeod is one of several immortals who decides to help preserve knowledge for humanity rather than continue their war for the Prize, though he is then killed by Kortan, the one remaining evil immortal. Taking place in the 27th century, the series features the young immortal hero Quentin MacLeod, last descendant of the MacLeod Clan. He is trained by another immortal named Don Vincente Marino Ramirez, an old friend of Connor's.

=== Reboot ===
In March 2008, Summit Entertainment announced that it had bought the film rights to Highlander and was remaking the original film. Kevin McKidd was rumoured to have been offered the role of Connor Macleod. Chad Stahelski was announced as a new director of the reboot which has been described to be John Wick with swords with the reboot planned as a possible trilogy. As of May 2020, the filming for the remake had not yet begun.

Kit Harington, James MacAvoy, Robert Pattinson, Stephen Amell, Sam Heughan and Charlie Hunnam were rumoured to be in the running for the role of Connor MacLeod. Ryan Reynolds was cast in 2012 but dropped out of the role the following year. In May 2021, Henry Cavill was confirmed to play the lead role in the film, although his exact character was unknown. In October 2023, Lionsgate was moving forward with the reboot, with Cavill starring as MacLeod and Stahelski directing from a screenplay by Mike Finch. Michael Fassbender was rumoured to be in the running for the villain role in the film. Stahelski has confirmed that music by Queen will be used in the reboot film. On June 20, 2025, Russell Crowe was announced to have joined the film as Ramirez. Dave Bautista has been cast as The Kurgan. Karen Gillan has been cast as Heather MacLeod. WWE Wrestler and Scottish born Drew McIntyre has been cast as Angus McLeod.
