= One Year of Love =

- French single picture sleeve

Single by Queen

from the album A Kind of Magic
- B-side: "Gimme the Prize (Kurgan's Theme)"
- Released: September 1986 (France)
- Studio: Townhouse, London
- Length: 4:26
- Label: EMI
- Songwriter: John Deacon
- Producers: Queen; Reinhold Mack

Queen singles chronology
"Princes of the Universe" (1986)	"One Year of Love" (1986)	"Friends Will Be Friends" (1986)

"One Year of Love" is a song by the British rock band Queen, written by John Deacon, originally released on their twelfth studio album A Kind of Magic in 1986.

== Background and composition ==
The song was written by John Deacon and sung by Freddie Mercury for the film Highlander; it plays on a radio during the bar scene. The album version features John Deacon playing Yamaha DX-7 synth and a string orchestra conducted by Lynton Naiff. The saxophone is played by Steve Gregory, a session musician who had previously performed on George Michael's 1984 number one "Careless Whisper".

The song was written in the key of D. Deacon decided to substitute the guitar components with a saxophone solo after a discussion with Brian May, who does not appear on the song.

== Release ==
It was released as a single in France and Spain only, and appeared during the bar scene in Highlander. The single charted in France and Spain. The B-side of the single was "Gimme the Prize (Kurgan's Theme)". In 1992, the song was released as a promo-single in the United States. An extended version running 6:41 was released on a bonus CD with the 2002 Immortal Edition DVD set for Highlander alongside the previously released album versions of "Princes of the Universe" and "Friends Will Be Friends".

The band never played the song in their live performances.

== Legacy ==
The song was covered by Elaine Paige on The Queen Album in 1988 and by Dutch singer Stevie Ann in 2006. It was chosen by Ultimate Classic Rock as number six in a countdown of the "Top 10 John Deacon Queen Songs". They argued Deacon "bares his emotions here in ways his bandmates (especially Freddie Mercury) rarely dared", describing it as a "heartfelt ballad" and acknowledging the "rare saxophone appearance" and "lush string arrangement" that heightens the song's romantic message.

== Chart performance ==
Chart (1986)	Peak position
France	56

== Personnel ==
Queen

- Freddie Mercury – lead and backing vocals
- Roger Taylor – tambourine
- John Deacon – bass guitar, synthesisers, sampler, drum machine

Additional musicians

- Steve Gregory – tenor saxophone
- Lynton Naiff – string arrangement
