= Friends Will Be Friends =

1986 single by Queen

- UK single picture sleeve

Single by Queen

from the album A Kind of Magic
- B-side: "Seven Seas of Rhye"
- Released: 9 June 1986
- Genre: Rock
- Length: 4:07 (7-inch album version); 5:58 (Friends Will Be Friends Will Be Friends version); 6:15 (12-inch extended version)
- Label: EMI
- Songwriters: Freddie Mercury; John Deacon
- Producers: Queen; Reinhold Mack

Queen singles chronology
"One Year of Love" (1986)	"Friends Will Be Friends" (1986)	"Pain Is So Close to Pleasure" (1986)

Music video
- "Friends Will Be Friends" on YouTube

"Friends Will Be Friends" is a song performed by Queen, written by Freddie Mercury and John Deacon, released on 9 June 1986 as a single for the album A Kind of Magic. It was the band's 30th single in the UK upon its release, reaching number 14 in the UK.

"Friends Will Be Friends" was performed live on The Magic Tour. It is remarkable in that it was the first and only song that was sung at the end of concerts between "We Will Rock You" and "We Are the Champions" since the News of the World Tour in 1977.

The song was included in various greatest hits compilations by Queen such as Greatest Hits II, Greatest Flix II and Greatest Video Hits II.

== Musical arrangement ==
The song's key signature is G major, and makes heavy use of Brian May's melodic guitar playing style. The song was debuted on the second show of The Magic Tour (Leiden). Queen played the complete version of the song for the first two Leiden shows then the arrangement was shortened on 14 June (Paris). The shorter version is featured on the Live At Wembley release. On all live versions, the song was performed in F major, modulated down a tone.

== Music video ==
The video was directed by DoRo and filmed at JVC Studios, Wembley in May 1986 and features the band performing the song in front of fan club members. During the show, Freddie Mercury "high fives" audience members, and at the end cuts the mic and sings along with them, letting them lead. Because of this, this performance was nicknamed "Queen's Greatest Show Never Performed".

== Critical reception ==
Upon its release in the UK, reviews were largely negative. Di Cross of Record Mirror considered "Friends Will Be Friends" to be "more overblown pomposity from a band who have made anthemic pop big business", although she noted it is "a bit mellower and slightly less theatrical than their usual performance". She was critical of the "banal lyrics", but concluded it was one of two "bearable" songs on a "disturbingly dull album". Stuart Husband of Number One awarded one out of five stars, calling it "more of the usual hard-driving over the top drivel". John McCready, writing for the NME, noted its chart potential and popularity but added that it is "so sad to see bags full of bombast translated into pound notes". Howard Johnson of Kerrang! stated, "I used to be big musical friends with Queen, but I'm veering sharply towards enemy ground! The same as usual and not as good as A Night at the Opera days."

== Track listings ==
7" Single

A Side. "Friends Will Be Friends" (Album Version) – 4:07

B Side. "Seven Seas Of Rhye" – 2:46

12" Single

A Side. "Friends Will Be Friends" (Extended Version) – 6:15

B1. "Friends Will Be Friends" (Album Version) – 4:07

B2. "Seven Seas Of Rhye" – 2:46

== Personnel ==
- Freddie Mercury – lead and backing vocals, piano, synthesizer
- Brian May – lead guitar, backing vocals
- Roger Taylor – drums, backing vocals, electronic drums
- John Deacon – bass guitar, rhythm guitar

== Charts ==
Chart (1986)	Peak position
Belgium (Ultratop 50 Flanders)	18
Ireland (IRMA)	4
Netherlands (Dutch Top 40)	17
Netherlands (Single Top 100)	16
New Zealand (Recorded Music NZ)	50
Spain (AFYVE)	18
Switzerland (Schweizer Hitparade)	19
UK Singles (Official Charts)	14
West Germany (GfK)	20
