= John Deacon =

English musician and songwriter (born 1951)

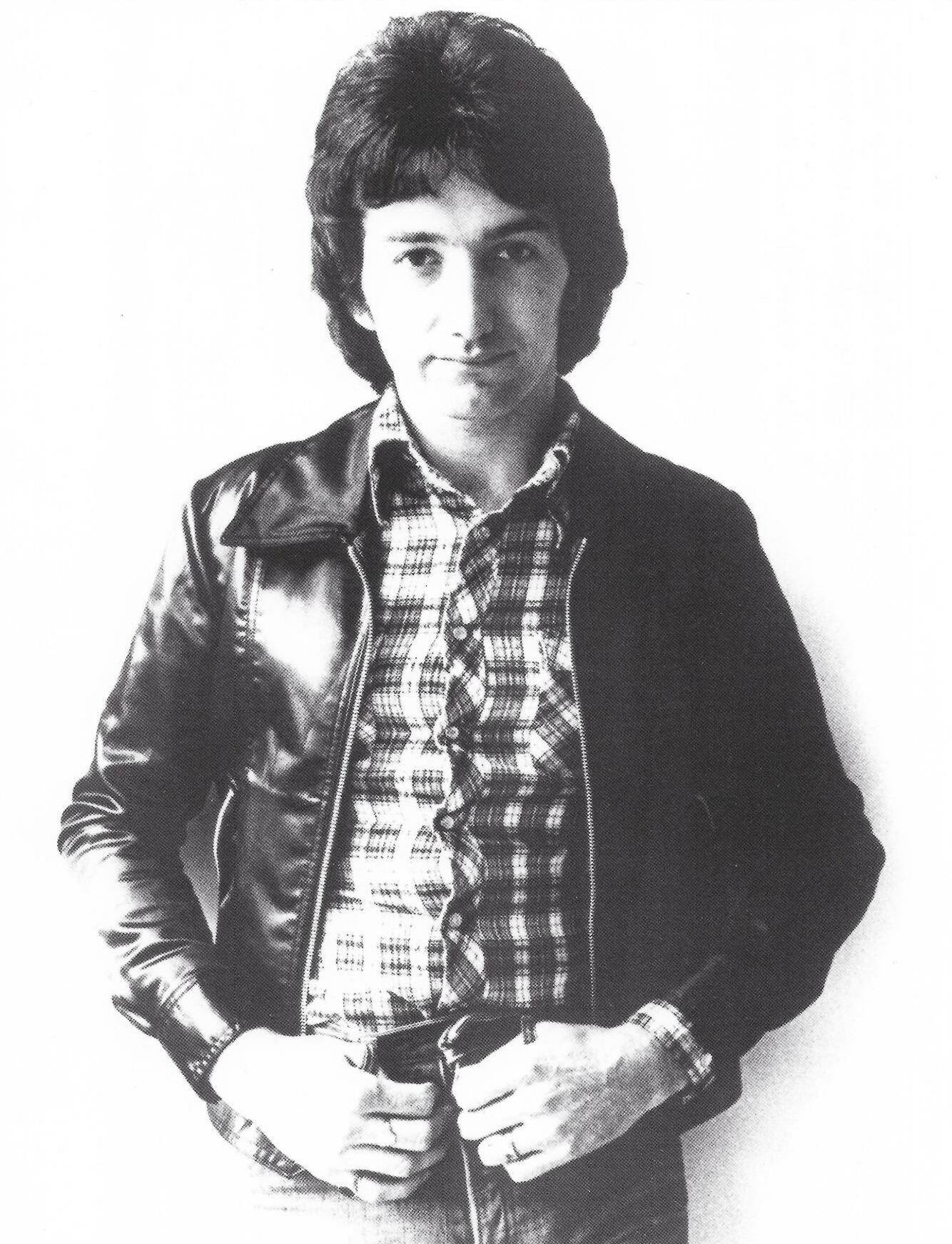
- Deacon in a 1977 publicity photo for News of the World
- Born: John Richard Deacon; 19 August 1951 (age 75); Leicester, Leicestershire, England
- Education: Chelsea College (BEng)
- Occupations: Musician; songwriter
- Years active: 1965–1997
- Spouse: Veronica Tetzlaff (m. 1975)
- Children: 6
- Musical career
- Genre: Rock
- Instrument: Bass guitar
- Formerly of: Queen

John Richard Deacon (born 19 August 1951) is an English retired musician who was the bass guitarist for the rock band Queen. He wrote several songs for the group, including Top 10 hits "You're My Best Friend", "Another One Bites the Dust" and "I Want to Break Free"; and co-wrote "Under Pressure", "Friends Will Be Friends" and "One Vision".

Deacon grew up in Oadby, Leicestershire, playing bass guitar in a local band, The Opposition, before moving to London to study electronics at Chelsea College. He joined Queen in 1971 on the strength of his musical and electronic skills, particularly the homemade Deacy Amp that guitarist Brian May used to create guitar orchestras throughout Queen's career. From the third album, Sheer Heart Attack, onwards, he wrote at least one song per album, several of which became hits. In addition to bass guitar, Deacon played guitar, keyboards, and piano on Queen's studio work.

After the death of lead singer Freddie Mercury in 1991 and the following year's Tribute Concert, Deacon performed only sporadically with the remaining members of Queen before retiring from the music industry in 1997 after recording "No-One but You (Only the Good Die Young)". He has not performed on any of the other projects that the two remaining members, Brian May and Roger Taylor, have put together. He remains involved in the financial aspects of the band.

Deacon was inducted into the Rock and Roll Hall of Fame as a member of Queen in 2001 and into the Songwriters Hall of Fame in 2003.

== Early life ==
John Richard Deacon was born on Sunday, 19 August 1951, at St Francis Private Hospital, London Road, Leicester, to Arthur Henry and Lilian Molly Deacon (née Perkins). He had an older brother, Robert, who died aged 6 in July 1953, and a younger sister Julie, born in January 1956. His father worked at the Norwich Union insurance company, and in 1960 the family moved to neighbouring Oadby. Deacon was known to friends and his bandmates as "Deacs" or "Deacy".

Deacon took an interest in electronics at an early age, reading magazines on the subject and building small devices, including modifying a reel-to-reel tape deck to record music directly from the radio. He studied at Linden Junior School in Evington, Gartree High School and Beauchamp Grammar School in Oadby, achieving eight GCE O level and three A level passes, all at grade A. He particularly enjoyed soul music.

In 1965, at the age of fourteen, Deacon formed a school band called The Opposition. The band would go through many lineup and name changes, with Deacon eventually leaving the band altogether in 1969 to pursue studies in Electrical Engineering at Chelsea College in London.

== Career ==
Deacon joined his first band, The Opposition, in 1965 at the age of 14. The band played covers of chart hits; Deacon played rhythm guitar using an instrument he bought with money borrowed from the group's founder, Richard Young. He switched to bass the following year after the original bassist was fired for not improving his playing as much as the other members. Deacon also acted as the band's archivist, taking clippings from newspapers of even the advertisements featuring The Opposition. After being in the band for four years, not long after the group cut an acetate of three songs, Deacon played his final concert with the band (then called The Art) in August 1969. He left as he had been accepted to study at Chelsea College in London (now part of King's College London), where he obtained a First Class Honours degree in Electronic Engineering in 1971. Having become a fan of Deep Purple, he saw the group perform the Concerto for Group and Orchestra with the Royal Philharmonic Orchestra at the Royal Albert Hall that September.

Although he left his bass and amplifier at home in Oadby, after less than a year of studying in London, Deacon decided he wanted to join a band. In 1970, Freddie Mercury, Brian May and Roger Taylor formed Queen; Deacon saw them in October that year but was not immediately impressed. Later in the year, he briefly formed a band called Deacon that made one live appearance at Chelsea College.

In early 1971, Deacon was introduced to Taylor and May by a friend at a disco who told him that they were in a band that had just lost its bassist. A couple of days later he auditioned in a lecture room at Imperial College London and became the last member of Queen to join. Deacon was the youngest member of the band. Deacon was selected for his musical talent, his quiet demeanour and his aptitude in electrical systems. A persistent legend claims Deacon was the seventh bassist auditioned, but more recent sources show Queen's bassists were, in order: Mike Grose, Barry Mitchell, Doug Bogie and Deacon. Deacon played his first show with Queen at the College of Estate Management in Kensington in June.

On Queen's first album (1973) he was credited as "Deacon John", to make him "sound more interesting". He asked to be credited under his real name, which was done on all albums from Queen II (1974) onwards.

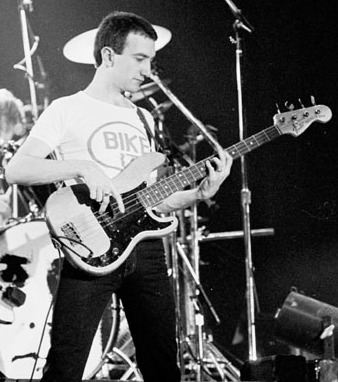
Deacon performing with Queen at the RDS Arena, Dublin on 22 November 1979

Deacon's first writing credit came on Queen's third album, Sheer Heart Attack (1974). He wrote "Misfire", a Caribbean-themed song on which he played almost all guitar parts, and co-wrote "Stone Cold Crazy" with the rest of the band. He also played some guide guitar parts on the album, as May was hospitalised with hepatitis when recording started. His second song, written for his fiancée Veronica, "You're My Best Friend", was featured on the group's fourth album, A Night at the Opera (1975), and went on to be an international hit. Subsequently, Deacon tended to write one or two songs for every Queen album, until The Miracle (1989) and Innuendo (1991), which credited the band as a whole.

He wrote the hit "Another One Bites the Dust" (1980) as a dance song based on his early love of soul. The song saw radio play on both black and white US music stations, quickly becoming one of the band's best-selling singles. Deacon would collaborate with Mercury throughout the early 1980s, helping push the band's musical direction towards a lighter disco sound.

Deacon's collaboration with Mercury culminated in the release of the band's 1982 album Hot Space. He played rhythm guitar on the opening "Staying Power" because of his soul and Motown-influenced style, and insisted on playing guitar on his own composition "Back Chat", not allowing May to play any guitar solos because the style did not fit what Deacon wanted; this led to an acrimonious argument between the two. "Back Chat", and the album as a whole, would prove commercially unsuccessful, leading to the band returning to their rock roots in subsequent albums.

By the mid-1980s Deacon had started to play with other bands as well. He performed on the single "Picking Up Sounds" by Man Friday & Jive Junior, a supergroup also featuring Thin Lizzy's Scott Gorham, Bad Company's Simon Kirke and Mick Ralphs, and The Pretenders' Martin Chambers and played with The Immortals, which released the track "No Turning Back" as part of the soundtrack to the film Biggles: Adventures in Time. Deacon played bass on Mercury's single with Montserrat Caballe "How Can I Go On" and also worked with Elton John and Hot Chocolate's Errol Brown.

Deacon considered his songwriting to be of equal importance to his musical skills in Queen. He later said: "If I'd just been a bass player all my life with the band, I wouldn't be as satisfied ... I only consider that as part of what I do".

== Retirement ==
Deacon was distraught by Mercury's death in November 1991 and this caused a significant reduction in his musical activity. He said, "As far as we are concerned, this is it. There is no point carrying on. It is impossible to replace Freddie." After playing live with Queen three more times: at The Freddie Mercury Tribute Concert for AIDS Awareness on 20 April 1992, in a charity concert with Roger Taylor at Cowdray House in Midhurst on 18 September 1993, and at the opening of the Bejart Ballet in Paris on 17 January 1997, performing only "The Show Must Go On" with Elton John on lead vocals – he decided to retire from music. He reappeared only briefly by joining his former bandmates in October 1997 for the recording of the final Queen song "No-One but You (Only the Good Die Young)", included on the Queen Rocks album released a month later. Deacon described the cover of "We Are the Champions" by May, Taylor and Robbie Williams – recorded for A Knight's Tale – as "rubbish".

Deacon has stayed out of the public eye since retiring. He chose not to be present at Queen's induction into the Rock and Roll Hall of Fame in 2001. He also did not join the collaboration with singer Paul Rodgers (as Queen + Paul Rodgers), where he was replaced on bass by Danny Miranda. On the Queen + Paul Rodgers collaboration album The Cosmos Rocks, the bass duties were split between May and Rodgers, but Deacon was thanked in the notes on the CD. May has since said that Deacon is still involved on the business side of Queen but chooses to stay out of the limelight. May also confirmed that Deacon approved of the making of the band's biopic Bohemian Rhapsody, where he was played by Joseph Mazzello. Deacon also appeared as a character in the parody biopic Weird: The Al Yankovic Story, played by David Dastmalchian.

In 2013, a newly-discovered species of the genus Heteragrion (Odonata: Zygoptera) from Brazil was named Heteragrion johndeaconi after Deacon, in honour of his musical and songwriting skills; one of four Heteragrion flatwing damselflies named after the bandmates, paying tribute to the 40th anniversary of the release of Queen's first album.

In a 2014 interview with Rolling Stone magazine regarding the forthcoming Queen + Adam Lambert North American tour with Adam Lambert, May and Taylor said that they no longer had much contact with Deacon except regarding finances, with Taylor stating that Deacon had "completely retired from any kind of social contact" and describing him as "a little fragile". May added, however, "he still keeps an eye on the finances, though. John Deacon is still John Deacon. We don't undertake anything financial without talking to him." Session bassist Neil Fairclough played on the tour. Apart from financial approvals, Deacon occasionally joins May and Taylor in signing auction items.

In 2022, May told Rock FM Spain that despite many enquiries, Deacon has repeatedly declined to rejoin Queen. May also said that it would not be easy for Deacon to return to performing live because "things have changed a lot, and Roger and I have adapted a certain amount. We're still very old school but we're aware of different ways of behaving these days and different ways in which our art is channelled... It's possible that we could meet in some low-stress situation, I think, but in public, probably not."

== Musical style and equipment ==
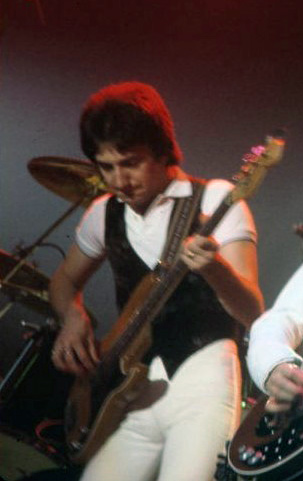
Deacon on stage at the New Haven Coliseum, Connecticut, US, in 1977

In 1973, Rolling Stone wrote that the combination of Taylor and Deacon "is explosive, a colossal sonic volcano whose eruption makes the earth tremble." Deacon played guitar in addition to bass, taking over rhythm parts on many albums, as well as several acoustic performances. Some of Deacon's most prominent guitar work appears on Hot Space (the clean Fender Telecaster single-coil sound), including all of the guitars on "Cool Cat". He would occasionally play synthesizers on his own compositions and often composed at the piano, playing a Wurlitzer electric piano on "You're My Best Friend". He can also be seen playing the grand piano in the music video to "Spread Your Wings", although on the actual recording the piano was played by Mercury. Unlike the other three members of Queen, Deacon did not sing on the group's records, though he did sing backing vocals during live performances and a small number of studio recordings.

Deacon's first bass, used in The Opposition, was an Eko, later switching to a Rickenbacker 4001. For most of Queen's career, he used a Fender Precision Bass, which underwent a number of cosmetic changes. Towards the end of the group's career, he used a custom bass designed by Roger Giffin. He also used an Ernie Ball MusicMan Stingray live on occasion. As a trained electronics engineer, he was able to build equipment for the band. His most famous creation is the "Deacy Amp", built in 1972 from pieces of electronic equipment found in a skip, and used by himself and May throughout Queen's recording career. Many of the so-called "guitar orchestras" on Queen albums use this amplifier.

Deacon usually played the bass with his fingers, only using a plectrum on some songs. He counted his influences as Chic, Michael Jackson and Stevie Wonder. His favourite bass players were Chris Squire of the progressive rock band Yes and The Who's John Entwistle. A trademark of Deacon's playing is his bass runs. A 1975 review of Sheer Heart Attack said, "Only at the end would a new initiate to Queen recognize John Deacon's unmistakable trademark... the least well known musician in Queen is one of his rock generation's most able."

== Personal life ==
Deacon has often been described as the quiet member of the band. Although the rest of the band felt he was the right bassist for them, he barely spoke in rehearsals and avoided arguments. Deacon lives in Putney in south-west London with his wife Veronica Tetzlaff, whom he married on 18 January 1975; he is the father of six children. One of the reasons for Queen splitting from Trident, their original management company, is that it refused to lend Deacon money to put a deposit on a house.

On 23 February 1985, Deacon was banned from driving for a year and fined £150 after being breathalysed for drink-driving in the West End of London.

According to the 2019 Sunday Times Rich List, Deacon was worth £130 million.

== Discography ==
Queen songs Deacon wrote that were released as singles:

- "You're My Best Friend" from A Night at the Opera
- "Spread Your Wings" from News of the World
- "Another One Bites the Dust" and "Need Your Loving Tonight" from The Game
- "Under Pressure" from Hot Space (co-written with Freddie Mercury, Brian May, Roger Taylor and David Bowie)
- "Back Chat" from Hot Space
- "I Want to Break Free" from The Works
- "One Vision" (co-written with Freddie Mercury, Brian May and Roger Taylor)
- "One Year of Love" from A Kind of Magic
- "Friends Will Be Friends", "Pain Is So Close to Pleasure" (both co-written with Freddie Mercury)
- "The Show Must Go On" from Innuendo (written by Queen, but mostly by Brian May)

Selected Queen album tracks:

- "Misfire" from Sheer Heart Attack
- "You and I" from A Day at the Races
- "Who Needs You" from News of the World
- "If You Can't Beat Them" and "In Only Seven Days" from Jazz
- "Cool Cat" from Hot Space (co-written with Freddie Mercury)
- "Rain Must Fall" and "My Baby Does Me" (both co-written with Freddie Mercury and credited to Queen) from The Miracle.
- "My Life Has Been Saved" (credited to Queen) from Made in Heaven.

Selected solo efforts:

- Jive Junior and Man Friday: "Picking Up Sounds" (7" single, 1983)
- The Immortals: "No Turning Back" (single from Biggles: Adventures in Time soundtrack) (1986)
