= Eglevsky =

Eglevsky can refer to:

- André Eglevsky, premier danseur and balletmaster
- Marina Eglevsky, ballerina and daughter to André
