= ArenaPAL =

British multimedia company

ArenaPAL Performing Arts Photo Library
- Company type: Privately held company
- Industry: photo archive, photo library, publishing, photography and the performing arts
- Genre: photography
- Founded: 1997
- Headquarters: London, United Kingdom
- Area served: Worldwide
- Services: Image licensing, picture research, archival services, arts photography commissions
- Divisions: Performing Arts Images
- Website: arenapal.com

ArenaPAL is a UK company, based in London, which specialises in the licensing of performing arts images, both in the UK and throughout the world. Its collection falls under the main categories of opera, theatre, classical and contemporary music, classical and contemporary dance, as well as educational imagery covering all categories.

It manages a library of 10 million images with over 900,000 currently viewable online. The library also holds thousands of unscanned prints, negatives and transparencies. These are digitised as part of its on-site archival scanning project. In 2007, it was declared the best international image library in the world.

== History ==
The ArenaPAL website serves as a portal to the company's primary search facility and distribution outlet

ArenaPAL was founded in 1997 as the first fully digitised performing arts archive. Unlike most specialist photographic agencies, it has worked with a wide range of contributors from its inception. The company continues to expand its extensive archive as well as taking in submissions of contemporary performance, including theatre, ballet, dance and opera productions, classical music, rock, pop and jazz events.

ArenaPAL is a member of the British Association of Picture Libraries and Agencies (BAPLA), which has declared it: "the best international performing arts photographic resource for all images users representing a unique collection from around the world", in 2007.

== Collections ==
In 2013 www.arenapal.com launched its new Imageflows powered search engine.

In addition to the original Performing Arts Library (PAL) (*) founded by Clive Barda, the following archives and collections are represented by ArenaPAL:

- Boosey and Hawkes Collection,
- Collection Christophel French film archive,
- Glyndebourne Collection (*), including:
  - Guy Gravett Archive,
  - Mike Hoban Archive,
- Le Pictorium (France),
- Noel Gay Archive,
- Roger Viollet (France),
- Royal Academy of Dance Collection,
- Royal Ballet School Special Collections,
- Royal College of Music Collections (*),
- Royal Opera House Collections (*), including:
  - Donald Southern Archive,
  - Edwin O. Sachs Archive,
  - Frank Sharman Archive,
  - Lady de Grey Archive,
  - Roger Wood Archive,
- The Stanislavski Centre theatre photo archive (*),
- Ullstein Bild,
- University of Bristol Theatre Collections (*), including:
  - Bertram Park and Yvonne Gregory Glass Plate Collection,
  - Bristol Old Vic Archive,
  - John Vickers Archive,
  - London Old Vic Archive,
  - Mander and Mitchenson Collection,
  - Richard Southern Collection,
  - Stephen Moreton-Prichard Collection,

(*) = Exclusive franchise

== Photographers ==
ArenaPAL represents the archives of many photographers of the performing arts, such as: Sue Adler, Simon Annand, Frazer Ashford, Sophie Baker, Joe Bangay, Clive Barda, Alan Bergman, Conrad Blakemore, John Bunting, Sisi Burn, Sheila Burnett, Laurence Burns, Christina Burton, Henrietta Butler, Sim Cannetty-Clarke, Pamela Chandler, Chris Christodoulou, Bill Cooper, Malcolm Crowthers, Fritz Curzon, Chris Davies, Ian Dickson, Mark Douet, Mark Ellidge, Elliot Franks, Maurice Foxall, Sasha Gusov, Manuel Harlan, Jamie Hodgson, Pete Jones, Jak Kilby, Marilyn Kingwill, Ellie Kurttz, Ivan Kyncl, Michael Le Poer Trench, Geraint Lewis, Mel Longhurst, Joan Marcus, Helen Maybanks, Lynn McAfee, Helen Murray, Morris Newcombe, Nigel Norrington, Elisabeth Novick, Jan Olofsson, The Other Richard, Johan Persson, Robert Piwko, Dan Porges, Linda Rich, Eric Richmond, Keith Saunders, Ron Scherl, Ken Sharp, Herb Snitzer, John Timbers, Allan Titmuss, Rik Walton, Michael Ward, Edward Webb, Max Whitaker, Darryl Williams, Colin Willoughby and Ali Wright.

== See also ==
- Image hosting service
- List of online image archives
- List of photo sharing websites
