= Hand in Hand (Dune song) =

Single by Dune

from the album Expedicion
- Released: April 1996
- Recorded: Plutonic Island Studios, Hamburg
- Genre: Happy hardcore; Eurodance
- Length: 3:31
- Label: Orbit Records
- Songwriters: Bernd Burhoff; Jens Oettrich; Oliver Froning
- Producers: Bernd Burhoff; Jens Oettrich

Dune singles chronology
"Rainbow to the Stars" (1996)	"Hand in Hand" (1996)	"Million Miles from Home" (1996)

Music video
- "Hand in Hand" on YouTube

"Hand in Hand" is a song by German electronic music group Dune, released in April 1996 by Orbit Records as the second single from their second album, Expedicion (1996). The song is produced by Bernd Burhoff and Jens Oettrich, who also co-wrote its lyrics with group member Oliver Froning, and the vocals are performed by Verena von Strenge. "Hand in Hand" was a notable hit in Europe and a top-10 hit in both Germany and the Netherlands. In Switzerland, it became a top-20 hit, while entering the top 40 in Austria. The accompanying music video was directed by Swedish-based director Matt Broadley, and references the Pied Piper of Hamelin.

== Track listing ==
- CD single, Germany (1996)
1. "Hand in Hand" (Video Mix) — 3:45
2. "Rainbow to the Stars" (Jam & Spoon Remix) — 7:32
- CD maxi, Germany (1996)
1. "Hand in Hand" (Video Mix) — 3:45
2. "Hand in Hand" (Head On Head) — 5:29
3. "Hand in Hand" (12" Mix) — 5:09
4. "Hand in Hand" (Jimmy Miller Remix) — 4:52

== Charts ==
=== Weekly charts ===
Chart (1996)	Peak position
Austria (Ö3 Austria Top 40)	39
Europe (Eurochart Hot 100)	40
Europe (European Dance Radio)	23
Germany (GfK)	10
Netherlands (Dutch Top 40)	7
Netherlands (Single Top 100)	9
Scotland (OCC)	86
Switzerland (Schweizer Hitparade)	18
UK Singles (OCC)	77
UK Pop Tip Club Chart (Music Week)	27

=== Year-end charts ===
Chart (1996)	Position
Germany (GfK)	92
Netherlands (Dutch Top 40)	57
Netherlands (Single Top 100)	71
