= Rainbow to the Stars =

Single by Dune

from the album Expedicion
- Released: 29 January 1996
- Recorded: Plutonic Island Studios, Hamburg
- Genre: Happy hardcore; Eurodance
- Length: 3:31
- Label: Orbit Records
- Songwriters: Bernd Burhoff; Jens Oettrich; Oliver Froning
- Producers: Bernd Burhoff; Jens Oettrich

Dune singles chronology
"Can't Stop Raving" (1995)	"Rainbow to the Stars" (1996)	"Hand in Hand" (1996)

Music video
- "Rainbow to the Stars" on YouTube

"Rainbow to the Stars" is a song by German band Dune, released in January 1996 by Orbit Records as the first single from their second album, Expedicion (1996). It is co-written by band member Oliver Froning with its producers, Bernd Burhoff and Jens Oettrich, and sung by Verena von Strenge. The song became a major hit in Europe, peaking in the top-10 in Finland and the Netherlands and the top-20 in the band's native Germany. Additionally, the song became a top-30 hit in Switzerland and a top-60 hit in Sweden. The accompanying music video was directed by Eric Will.

== Track listing ==
- CD single, Netherlands (1996)
1. "Rainbow to the Stars" (Video Mix) – 3:31
2. "Rainbow to the Stars" (12-Inch Mix) – 4:54
- CD maxi, Europe (1996)
1. "Rainbow to the Stars" (Video Mix) – 3:31
2. "Rainbow to the Stars" (Jimmy Miller Live Mix) – 6:28
3. "Rainbow to the Stars" (12-Inch Mix) – 4:54

== Charts ==
=== Weekly charts ===
Chart (1996)	Peak position
Finland (Suomen virallinen lista)	7
Germany (GfK)	12
Netherlands (Dutch Top 40)	10
Netherlands (Single Top 100)	8
Sweden (Sverigetopplistan)	52
Switzerland (Schweizer Hitparade)	23

=== Year-end charts ===
Chart (1996)	Position
Germany (Media Control)	100
Netherlands (Dutch Top 40)	89
