= List of photographs by Clive Barda =

Clive Barda (born 14 January 1945) is a British freelance photographer. His career has spanned nearly fifty years, during which he produced more than a million photographs of classical musicians (including composers and conductors) and artists of the stage (opera, ballet and theatre).

This list is a selection of Barda's better-known photographs from the book Performance!, published in 2000. In her review of the book for The Guardian, Charlotte Higgins stated: "Over the past 30 years, Barda has photographed anyone who is anyone in music, from late, great luminaries such as Lucia Popp, Olivier Messiaen, Benjamin Britten and Charles Groves to today's young stars such as Evgeny Kissin, David Daniels and Cecilia Bartoli. For a new book of his photographs, Performance, an extraordinary 750,000 pictures were whittled down to a final selection of just over 150; some of them are formal portraits, but most of them are shots of musicians in action."

== Selected works ==
The table below provides the following information:

- (title of the table) – including the period during which the photographs were taken
- Year – the year the photograph was taken (this column is sortable)
- Subject – the person(s) photographed (this column is sortable)
- Location – the place where the photograph was taken (this column is sortable)
- Date – the date when the photograph was taken (this column is not sortable)
- Page – the page number where the photograph appears in the book (this column is not sortable).

List of selected photographic works (1968–2000)
Year	Subject	Location	Date	Page
1992	Simon Rattle (Sir)	Barbican Concert Hall, London	20 Nov 1992	Front
1978	Sergiu Celibidache	Royal Festival Hall, London	10 Apr 1978	2-3
1977	Kiri Te Kanawa (Dame)	Royal Opera House, London	14 Jul 1977	5
1977	Vladimir Ashkenazy	All Saints Church, Petersham	26 Mar 1977	6
1984	Reginald Goodall (Sir)	Welsh National Opera, Cardiff	13 Feb 1984	8-9
1983	Klaus Tennstedt	Kingsway Hall, London	4 May 1983	10
1979	Carlos Kleiber	Royal Opera House, London	5 Sep 1979	11
1991	Anne Sofie von Otter	Royal Opera House, London	26 Jun 1991	13
1972	Daniel Barenboim (w. LPO & Edinburgh Festival Chorus)	George Watson College, Edinburgh	29 Aug 1972	14-15
1976	Itzhak Perlman & Pinchas Zukerman	Royal College of Music, London	24 Oct 1976	16-17
1969	Daniel Barenboim	No. 1 Studio, Abbey Road, London	22 May 1969	18
1968	Susan Drake	At home, London	12 Nov 1968	20
1997	Radu Lupu	Winchester College, Winchester	5 Oct 1997	23
1977	Maurice André	No. 1 Studio, Abbey Road, London	24 Jan 1977	26
1997	Valery Gergiev	Philharmonic Hall, Rotterdam	27-28 Nov 1997	29
1982	Vladimir Horowitz	Royal Festival Hall, London	18 May 1982	30
1996	Evgeny Kissin	Barbican Concert Hall, London	6 Jun 1996	31
1996	Evgeny Kissin	Barbican Concert Hall, London	6 Jun 1996	32-33
1981	Rudolf Serkin	Kingsway Hall, London	6 Sep 1981	34
1978	Mstislav Rostropovich	No. 1 Studio, Abbey Road, London	20 Apr 1978	35
1995	Daniil Shafran	Wigmore Hall, London	24 Apr 1995	36
1970	Jacqueline du Pré	The Fairfield Halls, Croydon	30 Jan 1970	37
1988	Anne-Sophie Mutter	Royal Festival Hall, London	18 Feb 1988	38
1988	Mirella Freni	Chalk Farm Studios, London	12 Feb 1988	39
1986	Agnes Baltsa	Royal Opera House, London	15 May 1986	40-41
1985	Lucia Popp	St John's, Smith Square, London	23 Aug 1985	42
1996	Roberto Alagna & Angela Gheorghiu	Royal Opera House, London	7 Jul 1996	43
1979	Teresa Stratas	Royal Opera House, London	17 Jul 1979	44
1994	Amanda Roocroft	Glyndebourne	14 Jul 1994	45
1997	Oliver Knussen & Peter Serkin	Henry Wood Hall, London	14 Dec 1997	46-47
1997	Alfred Brendel	Usher Hall, Edinburgh	24 Aug 1997	48 & 49
1973	Artur Rubinstein	Bishopsgate Hall, London	2-6 Oct 1973	50
1975	Artur Rubinstein	Kingsway Hall, London	10 Mar 1975	51
1997	Ravi Shankar	Barbican Concert Hall, London	18 Mar 1997	52
1974	John Williams	CBS Studios, Whitfield St, London	28 Feb 1974	53
1990	Julian Bream	At home, Wiltshire	9 Mar 1990	54-55
1978	Geraint Evans (Sir)	London Opera Centre, London	6 Jun 1978	56
2000	Thomas Allen (Sir)	Royal Opera House, London	13 May 2000	57
2000	Bernard Haitink	Royal Opera House, London	11 Oct 2000	58-59
1997	Antonio Pappano (Sir)	Usher Hall, Edinburgh	28 Aug 1997	60
1989	Pierre Boulez	Barbican Concert Hall, London	14 Jan 1989	61
1971	Aaron Copland	No. 1 Studio, Abbey Road, London	c. 1971	62
2000	Harrison Birtwistle (Sir)	Berlin	23 Mar 2000	63
2000	Pierre Boulez	Barbican Concert Hall, London	1 Feb 2000	63
1996	Hans Werner Henze	Henry Wood Hall, London	13 Jun 1996	64
1977	Aram Khachaturian	No. 1 Studio, Abbey Road, London	2 Feb 1977	65
1999	György Kurtág	Queen's Hall, Edinburgh	25 Aug 1999	66
1973	Karlheinz Stockhausen	No. 1 Studio, Abbey Road, London	20 Mar 1973	67
1986	Malcolm Arnold (Sir)	Walthamstow Town Hall, London	28 Oct 1986	68
1986	Olivier Messiaen	Bath Festival	27 May 1986	69
1985	Philip Glass	At home, New York	26 Feb 1985	70
1982	György Ligeti	Westbury Hotel, New York	21 May 1982	71
1993	Toru Takemitsu	Aldeburgh Festival	13 Jun 1993	72
1988	Mark-Anthony Turnage	At home, London	8 Jun 1988	73
1986	Richard Rodney Bennett (Sir)	Queen Elizabeth Hall, London	28 May 1986	74
1974	Luciano Berio	BBC Maida Vale Studio, London	17 Aug 1974	75
2000	Arvo Pärt	St Marylebone Church, London	27 Mar 2000	76-77
1976	Stephen Sondheim	CBS Studios, Whitfield St, London	15 May 1976	78
1974	Peter Maxwell Davies (Sir)	Clive Barda's Studio, London	12 Aug 1974	79
1985	Witold Lutosławski	Queen Elizabeth Hall, London	5 Dec 1985	80-81
1972	John Ogdon	Fairfield Halls, Croydon	c. 1972	82
1973	Murray Perahia	CBS Studios, Whitfield St, London	30 May 1973	84-85
1976	Claudio Arrau	Royal Albert Hall, London	6 Jun 1976	86
1986	Stephen Kovacevich	Barbican Concert Hall, London	16 Feb 1986	87
2000	András Schiff	Queen's Hall, Edinburgh	25 Aug 2000	88
1997	Maurizio Pollini	Royal Festival Hall, London	28 Apr 1997	89
1991	Mitsuko Uchida	Royal Festival Hall, London	12 Dec 1991	90-91
1975	Clifford Curzon (Sir)	Palais des Congrès, Paris	21-22 Oct 1975	92
1972	Emil Gilels	No. 1 Studio, Abbey Road, London	c. 1972	93
1969	Yehudi Menuhin (Lord)	No. 1 Studio, Abbey Road, London	1969	94
1978	Carlo Bergonzi	Clive Barda's Studio, London	21 Mar 1978	95
1979	Nathan Milstein	Royal Festival Hall, London	25 Mar 1979	96
1980	Gidon Kremer	St John's, Smith Square, London	2 Feb 1980	97
1991	Igor Oistrakh	Henry Wood Hall, London	4 Mar 1991	98-99
1969	Kyung Wha Chung	BBC Studio, Broadcasting House, London	1969	100
1976	Ida Haendel	Royal Albert Hall, London	30 Jun 1976	101
1994	Viktoria Mullova	Barbican Concert Hall, London	21 Apr 1994	102-103
1979	Isaac Stern	Royal Festival Hall, London	11 Feb 1979	104
1998	Thomas Zehetmair	Usher Hall, Edinburgh	17 Aug 1998	105
1995	Daniele Gatti	Barbican Concert Hall, London	25 May 1995	106
1994	Riccardo Chailly	Barbican Concert Hall, London	24 Apr 1994	107
1991	Maxim Shostakovich	Barbican Concert Hall, London	7 Mar 1991	108-109
1980	Rafael Kubelík	Royal Festival Hall, London	1 Jul 1980	110
1991	Yuri Temirkanov	Royal Festival Hall, London	13 Feb 1991	111
1976	Leopold Stokowski	West Ham, London	24 May 1976	112
1975	Eugene Ormandy	Royal Festival Hall, London	7 May 1975	113
1986	Carlo Maria Giulini	Henry Wood Hall, London	6 Mar 1986	114
1997	Zubin Mehta	Barbican Concert Hall, London	18 Mar 1997	115
1976	Adrian Boult (Sir)	Royal Albert Hall, London	16 Oct 1976	116-117
1995	Steven Isserlis	Bath Festival	30 May-1 Jun 95	118
1995	Joshua Bell	Bath Festival	30 May-1 Jun 95	119
1995	Pamela Frank	Bath Festival	30 May-1 Jun 95	119
1995	Jon Kimura Parker	Bath Festival	30 May-1 Jun 95	119
1995	Tabea Zimmermann	Bath Festival	30 May-1 Jun 95	119
1995	P. Frank, J. Bell, J. Kimura Parker, T. Zimmermann, St. Isserlis	Bath Festival	30 May-1 Jun 95	120-121
1993	Yo-Yo Ma	Teatro Communale, Florence	21 Jun 1993	122-123
1984	Yan Pascal Tortelier	Henry Wood Hall, London	23 Sep 1984	124
1984	Paul Tortelier	No. 1 Studio, Abbey Road, London	16 Nov 1984	125
1973	Lionel Tertis	At home, London	30 Nov 1973	126
1996	Yuri Bashmet	Royal Albert Hall, London	9 Aug 1996	127
1996	Evelyn Glennie (Dame)	Windsor Festival, Windsor	22 Sep 1996	128
1991	Evelyn Glennie (Dame)	Eton College, Eton	28 Apr 1991	129
1976	Daniel Barenboim, Jacqueline du Pré	Outside St Paul's Cathedral, London	4 Jul 1976	130
1992	Cecilia Bartoli	Teatro Communale, Bologna	16 Jun 1992	132
1999	José Cura	Walthamstow Town Hall, London	8 Jul 1999	133
1996	Josephine Barstow (Dame)	Opera North, Leeds	17 Apr 1996	134
1981	Janet Baker (Dame)	Royal Opera House, London	24 Nov 1981	135
1995	Felicity Lott (Dame)	Royal Opera House, London	1 Feb 1995	135
1980	Ileana Cotrubaș	Royal Opera House, London	12 Dec 1980	136
1985	Joan Sutherland (Dame)	Royal Opera House, London	10 Apr 1985	137
1977	Claudio Abbado & Teresa Berganza	St John's, Smith Square, London	15 Sep 1977	138
1996	David Daniels	Glyndebourne Festival Opera	11 May 1996	139
1977	James Levine	No. 1 Studio, Abbey Road, London	12 Aug 1977	140
1977	James Levine & Renata Scotto	No. 1 Studio, Abbey Road, London	12 Aug 1977	141
1973	Charles Groves (Sir) & grandson	At home, London	1 Jun 1973	142-143
1973	Andrew Davis (Sir)	Glyndebourne, The Organ Room	6 Aug 1973	144
1996	Andrew Davis (Sir)	No. 1 Studio, Abbey Road, London	7 Sep 1996	145
1987	Jeffrey Tate	Philharmonie, Berlin	14-17 Aug 1987	146
1977	Charles Mackerras (Sir)	No. 1 Studio, Abbey Road, London	24 Jan 1977	147
1999	Mark Elder (Sir)	Royal Albert Hall, London	23 Jul 1999	148
1996	Paul Daniel	Barbican Concert Hall, London	29 Apr 1996	149
1996	Daniel Harding	Barbican Concert Hall, London	2 May 1996	150
1986	John Eliot Gardiner (Sir)	All Saints Church, Tooting, London	18 Mar 1986	151
1999	Roger Norrington (Sir)	Royal Festival Hall, London	24 Nov 1999	152
1974	Neville Marriner (Sir)	CBS Studios, Whitfield St, London	23 Aug 1974	153
1995	Georg Solti (Sir)	Royal Festival Hall, London	1 May 1995	155
1978	Eugen Jochum	No. 1 Studio, Abbey Road, London	30 Jun 1978	156-157
1990	Luciano Pavarotti	Royal Opera House, London	10 Mar 1990	158-159
1997	Plácido Domingo	Kirov Opera, St Petersburg	25 Oct 1997	160-161
1984	José Carreras & Teresa Berganza	Royal Opera House, London	16 Oct 1984	162-163
1979	Tatiana Troyanos & Renata Scotto	Henry Wood Hall, London	19 Jul 1979	164
1977	Ileana Cotrubaș & Teresa Berganza	King's Theatre, Edinburgh	27 Aug 1977	165
1987	Christa Ludwig	Staatsoper, Hamburg	9-11 Mar 1987	166
1977	Grace Bumbry	Royal Opera House, London	31 Oct 1977	167
1993	John Tomlinson (Sir)	Royal Opera House, London	2 Oct 1993	168
1982	John Tomlinson (Sir)	St John's, Smith Square, London	12 Aug 1982	169
1979	Leontyne Price	Walthamstow Town Hall, London	31 Jul 1979	170
1978	Victoria de los Ángeles	BBC Studio, Egton House, London	29 Apr 1978	171
1985	Jessye Norman	Berkeley Square, London	8 Aug 1985	172-173
1984	Radu Lupu & Murray Perahia	The Maltings, Snape, Suffolk	26 Jun 1984	174-175
1993	Sviatoslav Richter	Air Studios, London	22 Nov 1993	176, 177
1973	Peter Pears (Sir)	Royal Opera House, London	1 Jun 1973	178
1976	Benjamin Britten (Lord)	The Maltings, Snape, Suffolk	11 Jun 1976	179
1978	Barry Tuckwell	At home, London	17 Oct 1978	180-181
1980	Jean-Pierre Rampal	Olympic Studios, London	22 Dec 1980	182
1969	David Munrow	No. 1 Studio, Abbey Road, London	c. 1969	183
1985	Martha Argerich	Walthamstow Town Hall, London	29 May 1985	184-185
1999	Günter Wand	Usher Hall, Edinburgh	31 Aug 1999	186
1981	Kurt Sanderling	Kingsway Hall, London	15 Jan 1981	187
1999	Vladimir Ashkenazy	Royal Festival Hall, London	30 Nov 1999	188, 189
1998	Esa-Pekka Salonen	Théâtre de Châtelet, Paris	3 Feb 1998	190-191
1994	Evgeny Svetlanov	Lambeth Mission, London	22 Sep 1994	192
1994	Seiji Ozawa	Barbican Concert Hall, London	8 Nov 1994	193
1994	Kurt Masur	Barbican Concert Hall, London	21 Apr 1994	194
1990	Christoph von Dohnányi	Royal Opera House, London	7 Nov 1990	195
1998	Christian Thielemann	Festspielhaus Baden-Baden	5 Jun 1998	196-197
2000	Leonard Slatkin	Royal Festival Hall, London	16 Mar 2000	198
1995	Colin Davis (Sir)	Barbican Concert Hall, London	16 Feb 1995	199
1990	Michael Tilson Thomas	Barbican Concert Hall, London	30 Sep 1990	200
1990	Giuseppe Sinopoli	Royal Festival Hall, London	15 Mar 1990	201
1993	Lorin Maazel	Royal Festival Hall, London	15 Dec 1993	202-203
1971	André Previn	Morley College, London	c. 1971	204
1970	Leonard Bernstein	Royal Albert Hall, London	Feb 1970	205
1990	Joan Sutherland & Luciano Pavarotti	Royal Opera House, London	31 Dec 1990	206-207
1976	Dietrich Fischer-Dieskau	Royal Festival Hall, London	14 Dec 1976	208
1980	Pierre Fournier & Mstislav Rostropovich	Royal Festival Hall, London	11 May 1980	209
1973	Yehudi Menuhin & Stéphane Grappelli	No. 1 Studio, Abbey Road, London	7 Mar 1973	Back
