= Dune 2 =

Dune 2 most often refers to:

- Dune: Part Two, a 2024 film directed by Denis Villeneuve, the sequel to the first film
- Dune Messiah, a 1969 novel by Frank Herbert, the sequel to the first novel

Dune 2 or Dune II may also refer to:

- Dune II, a 1992 real-time strategy video game
- Dune II (MUSH), a 1990s multi-user online game
- The Second Dune, a 1973 novel by Shelby Hearon
- Frank Herbert's Children of Dune, a 2003 miniseries, the sequel to Frank Herbert's Dune

== See also ==
- Dune (disambiguation)
