= There for Me =

There for Me may refer to:

- "There for Me" (La Bionda song), also recorded by Sarah Brightman
- "There for Me", a song by Mariah Carey, B-side to "Never Too Far/Hero Medley"
- "There for Me" (Bonnie Piesse song)
