= Can't Stop Raving =

Single by Dune

from the album Dune
- Released: 23 October 1995
- Recorded: Plutonic Island Studios, Hamburg
- Length: 3:33
- Label: Urban; Impulse; Max Music
- Songwriters: Bernd Burhoff; Jens Oettrich; Oliver Froning

Dune singles chronology
"Are You Ready to Fly" (1995)	"Can't Stop Raving" (1995)	"Rainbow to the Stars" (1996)

Music video
- "Can't Stop Raving" on YouTube

"Can't Stop Raving" is a song by German electronic group Dune, released in 1995, by labels Urban, Impulse and Max Music, as the third and last single from the group's debut album, Dune (1995). It was co-written by band member Oliver Froning and features female vocals performed by Tina Lagao and Janine Kelly-Fiddes. The song achieved moderate success in Europe, becoming a top-10 hit in Germany, the Netherlands and Spain. Additionally, it was a top-20 hit in Switzerland. The accompanying music video was directed by Delano Sookha and was A-listed on German music television channel VIVA in December 1995. The album version of "Can't Stop Raving" was used as theme music on Joel Veitch's Tales of the Blode.

== Track listing ==
- CD single, Germany (1995)
1. "Can't Stop Raving" (video mix) — 3:33
2. "Can't Stop Raving" (12" mix) — 5:07
- CD maxi, Europe (1995)
1. "Can't Stop Raving" (video mix) — 3:33
2. "Can't Stop Raving" (club mix) — 4:53
3. "Can't Stop Raving" (12 inch mix) — 5:10
4. "Can't Stop Raving" (vocoder mix) — 3:52

== Charts ==
Chart (1995–96)	Peak positions
Germany (GfK)	7
Netherlands (Dutch Top 40)	9
Netherlands (Single Top 100)	10
Spain (AFYVE)	4
Switzerland (Schweizer Hitparade)	16
