= Timeless (Sarah Brightman album) =

1997 studio album by Sarah Brightman

Studio album by Sarah Brightman
- Released: 2 June 1997 (UK); 23 September 1997 (US)
- Recorded: November 1996 – March 1997
- Studios: Abbey Road Studios (London, England); Angel Recording Studios (London, England); Nemo Studios (Hamburg, Germany); Nemo Studios (London, England); Alexander Digital Suite (Miami, FL)
- Genre: Classical Crossover
- Length: 52:36
- Label: East West
- Producer: Frank Peterson

Sarah Brightman chronology
Fly (1995)	Timeless (1997)	The Andrew Lloyd Webber Collection (1997)

Professional ratings
Review scores
Source	Rating
AllMusic	4/5 stars

Timeless, known as Time to Say Goodbye in the United States and Canada and on Super Audio CD, is the fifth studio album by English classical crossover soprano Sarah Brightman, together with the London Symphony Orchestra. It sold over 1.4 million copies in the United States and topped its Billboard Classical Albums chart for 35 weeks. It went gold or platinum in 21 countries. The album's cover photograph is by Simon Fowler.

== Track listing ==
No.	Title	Writer(s)	Length
1.	"No One Like You"	Jerry Goldsmith; David Zippel	4:45
2.	"Just Show Me How to Love You" (feat. José Cura)	Frank Peterson; Dario Baldan Bembo; Paolo Amerigo Cassella; Rita Flügge-Timm	4:00
3.	"Tú Quieres Volver"	Nicolas Reyes; Paul Reyes; Francois Reyes; Patchai Reyes; Andre Reyes; Diego Baliardo; Paco Baliardo; Tonino Baliardo; Chico Bouchikhi	3:49
4.	"In Pace"	Patrick Doyle	3:07
5.	"There for Me" (feat. José Cura)	Charly Ricanek; Angelo La Bionda; Carmelo La Bionda; Chiara Ferraú; Richard Palmer-James	3:45
6.	"Bilitis-Générique"	Francis Lai	3:25
7.	"Who Wants to Live Forever"	Brian May	3:55
8.	"La Wally"	Alfredo Catalani	4:04
9.	"Naturaleza Muerta"	José María Cano	5:26
10.	"En Aranjuez con tu Amor"	Joaquín Rodrigo; Alfredo García Segura	3:51
11.	"In trutina"	Carl Orff	2:31
12.	"Time to Say Goodbye (Con te partirò)" (feat. Andrea Bocelli)	Francesco Sartori; Lucio Quarantotto; Frank Peterson	4:06
13.	"O mio babbino caro" (Live)	Giacomo Puccini	2:41
14.	"Alleluja" (Live)	Wolfgang Amadeus Mozart	3:11
Total length:			52:36

The Time to Say Goodbye release opens with the title song and is otherwise identical.

== Singles ==
- "Time to Say Goodbye" (feat. Andrea Bocelli) (1996)
- "Just Show Me How to Love You" (1997)
- "Tú Quieres Volver" (1997)
- "There for Me" (1997)
- "Who Wants to Live Forever" (1997)

== Charts ==
The album peaked at No. 71 on the Billboard Top 200 and at No. 1 on its Top Classical Albums, where it stayed for 35 consecutive weeks.

=== Weekly ===
Chart (1997)	Peak position
Australian Albums (ARIA Charts)	63
Austrian Albums (Ö3 Austria)	31
Belgian Albums (Ultratop Flanders)	36
Belgian Albums (Ultratop Wallonia)	31
Canada Top Albums/CDs (RPM); Time to Say Goodbye	43
Dutch Albums (Album Top 100)	38
Finnish Albums (Suomen virallinen lista)	12
French Albums (SNEP)	72
German Albums (Offizielle Top 100)	17
Norwegian Albums (VG-lista)	3
Scottish Albums (Official Charts)	8
Swedish Albums (Sverigetopplistan)	2
Taiwanese International Albums (IFPI); Time to Say Goodbye	5
UK Albums (Official Charts)	2
US Billboard 200; Time to Say Goodbye	71
US Top Classical Albums (Billboard); Time to Say Goodbye	1
US Heatseekers Albums (Billboard); Time to Say Goodbye	5

=== Year-end ===
Chart (1997)	Position
German Albums (Offizielle Top 100)	54
UK Albums (OCC)	73

== Certifications ==
Region	Certification	Certified units/sales
Brazil (Pro-Música Brasil)	Gold	100,000^{*}
Canada (Music Canada)	3× Platinum	300,000^{^}
Denmark (IFPI Danmark)	Platinum	50,000^{^}
Finland (Musiikkituottajat)	Gold	30,393
Germany (BVMI)	Gold	250,000^{^}
Netherlands (NVPI)	Gold	50,000^{^}
New Zealand (RMNZ)	3× Platinum	45,000^{^}
Sweden (GLF)	2× Platinum	160,000^{^}
United Kingdom (BPI)	Gold	100,000^{^}
United States (RIAA)	Platinum	1,400,000
Summaries
Europe (IFPI)	Platinum	1,000,000^{*}
^{*} Sales figures based on certification alone.^{^} Shipments figures based on certification alone.
