= Dune (disambiguation) =

A dune is a hill of sand.

Dune or dunes may also refer to:

== Places and buildings ==
- Düne, Heligoland, Germany
- Dunes, Tarn-et-Garonne, France
- Dune (crater), on the Moon
- Dunes (hotel and casino), Paradise, Nevada, US
- Dunes Hotel and Casino (Atlantic City), US, unbuilt

== Science fiction ==
Dune (franchise) of novels, films, and games:

- Dune (novel), a 1965 novel by Frank Herbert
- Arrakis or Dune, a fictional planet
- Dune (1984 film), a 1984 film directed by David Lynch
- Frank Herbert's Dune, a 2000 television miniseries
- Dune (2021 film), also titled onscreen as Dune: Part One, a film directed by Denis Villeneuve
- Dune (board game) (1979)
- Dune (1984 board game), see List of games based on Dune
- Dune (Virgin Interactive / Westwood Studios) video game series, see List of games based on Dune
  - Dune (video game) (1992)
  - Frank Herbert's Dune (video game) (2001)
- Dune (card game) (1997)

=== Soundtracks ===
- Dune (1984 soundtrack), the soundtrack to the 1984 film
- Music of Dune (2021 film), the various soundtracks to the 2021 film

== Music ==
=== Bands and musicians ===
- Dune (band), a German progressive trance/hardcore group
- Dúné, a Danish rock band
- Brothomstates or Dune, Finnish IDM musician
- Jade MacRae, Australian soul singer also known as Dune
- Dune (Charles May), vocalist on Quincy Jones's version of "Ai No Corrida"

=== Albums ===
- Dune (Dune album) (1995)
- Dune (Klaus Schulze album) (1979)
- Dune (L'Arc-en-Ciel album) (1993)
- Dunes (album), an album by Garden & Villa
- Dune by David Matthews (1977)

=== Songs ===
- "Dune" (song), by Hachi, 2017
- "Dune", a song by Susumu Hirasawa from Water in Time and Space
- "Dune", a song by Zion I from Deep Water Slang V2.0
- "Dunes", a 1975 tune by Keith Jarrett from Arbour Zena
- "Dunes", a song by Scale the Summit from Carving Desert Canyons
- "Dunes", a song by the Alabama Shakes
- "Dune", a 2023 song by Ateez from their EP The World EP.2: Outlaw

== People ==
- Chris "Dune" Pastras (b. 1972), American skateboarder, artist, and company owner

== Other uses ==
- Deep Underground Neutrino Experiment (DUNE), at Fermilab, United States
- Dune (mathematics software), for solving partial differential equations using grid-based methods
- Dunes (stamps), a series of (now worthless) collector's editions of stamps from the Trucial States (now the United Arab Emirates)
- Dune London, a British shoe manufacturer and retailer
- "The Dune", a short story by Stephen King
- The Dune (film) a 2013 French-Israeli film directed by Yossi Aviram

== See also ==
- Dune shearwater, an extinct seabird species from the Canary Islands
- Dyuny railway station, a railway station near Sestroretsk, St. Petersburg, Russia
