= Million Miles from Home =

Single by Dune

from the album Expedicion
- Released: August 1996
- Length: 5:56 (12" mix); 4:22 (album version); 3:58 (video edit)
- Label: Orbit Records
- Songwriters: Bernd Burhoff; Jens Oettrich; Oliver Froning
- Producers: Bernd Burhoff; Jens Oettrich

Dune singles chronology
"Hand in Hand" (1996)	"Million Miles from Home" (1996)	"Who Wants to Live Forever" (1997)

Music video
- "Million Miles from Home" on YouTube

"Million Miles from Home" is a song by German band Dune, released in August 1996 by Orbit Records as the third single from the group's second album, Expedicion (1996). It is written by band member Oliver Froning with producers Bernd Burhoff and Jens Oettrich, and sung by Verena von Strenge. The song became a top-10 hit in the Netherlands and a top-20 hit in the band's native Germany. Additionally, it was a top-40 hit in both Sweden and Switzerland. On the Eurochart Hot 100, "Million Miles from Home" peaked at number 61 in October 1996. The accompanying music video depicts von Strenge alone on a planet in the outer space.

== In popular culture ==
Drum and bass band Pendulum sampled "Million Miles from Home" in their song "Propane Nightmares". It was also released on a CD celebrating the 30 year anniversary of Star Trek, Star Trek - 30 Years A Tribute.

== Track listing ==
- 12", Germany (1996)
1. "Million Miles from Home" (12" Mix) – 5:56
2. "Million Miles from Home" (B-Side Mix) – 5:36
3. "Million Miles from Home" (Vocoder Mix) – 4:36
- CD single, Germany (1996)
1. "Million Miles from Home" (Video Mix) – 3:58
2. "Million Miles from Home" (B-Side Mix) – 5:36
- CD maxi, Europe (1996)
1. "Million Miles from Home" (Video Mix) – 3:58
2. "Million Miles from Home" (12" Mix) – 5:56
3. "Million Miles from Home" (B-Side Mix) – 5:36
4. "Million Miles from Home" (Vocoder Mix) – 4:36

== Charts ==
=== Weekly charts ===
Chart (1996)	Peak position
Europe (Eurochart Hot 100)	61
Germany (GfK)	17
Netherlands (Dutch Top 40)	12
Netherlands (Single Top 100)	10
Sweden (Sverigetopplistan)	40
Switzerland (Schweizer Hitparade)	39

=== Year-end charts ===
Chart (1996)	Position
Netherlands (Dutch Top 40)	92
