= Froning =

Froning is a surname. Notable people with the surname include:

- Mary Froning (1934–2014), American baseball player
- Oliver Froning (born 1963), German musician
- Rich Froning Jr. (born 1987), American CrossFit athlete
