= Who Wants to Live Forever =

1986 song by Queen

- UK single picture sleeve

Single by Queen

from the album A Kind of Magic
- B-side: "Killer Queen"
- Released: 15 September 1986
- Studio: Abbey Road (London, England)
- Length: 5:15 (album version); 4:55 (Greatest Hits II version); 4:01 (single version)
- Label: EMI
- Songwriter: Brian May
- Producers: Queen; David Richards

Queen singles chronology
"Pain Is So Close to Pleasure" (1986)	"Who Wants to Live Forever" (1986)	"I Want It All" (1989)

Music video
- "Who Wants to Live Forever" on YouTube

"Who Wants to Live Forever" is a song by the British rock band Queen. A power ballad, it is the sixth track on their twelfth studio album, A Kind of Magic, which was released in June 1986, and was written by lead guitarist Brian May for the soundtrack to the film Highlander. The band were backed by an orchestra conducted by film score composer Michael Kamen. The song was produced by Queen with David Richards and peaked at No. 24 in the UK charts. The accompanying music video was directed by David Mallet and filmed in London. In 1991, "Who Wants to Live Forever" was included in the band's second compilation album, Greatest Hits II.

Since its release, the song has been covered by many artists, such as German band Dune in 1996, whose version peaked at number two in Germany. Five months after Mercury's death in November 1991, Seal performed a live version of the song at The Freddie Mercury Tribute Concert in 1992. In 2014, Rolling Stone readers voted it their fifth favourite song by Queen, and in 2018 it was listed at number 15 in "The top 20 Queen songs of all time" by Smooth Radio.

== Recording ==
In the 1986 film Highlander, starring Christopher Lambert, the song is used to frame the scenes in the film where Connor MacLeod must endure his beloved wife Heather MacLeod growing old and dying while he, an Immortal, remains forever young. Brian May wrote the song in the backseat of his car after seeing a 20-minute first cut of the scene of Heather's death. It was later used in the Highlander television series episodes "The Gathering", "Revenge is Sweet", "The Hunters", "Line of Fire", and "Leader of the Pack".

In the film version, Freddie Mercury provides all the main vocals. On the album version, May sings lead vocals on the first verse before Mercury takes over, with May also singing "But touch my tears with your lips" during Mercury's verse and the closing line "Who waits forever anyway?". An instrumental version of the song, entitled "Forever", was included as a bonus track on the CD version of the album. This instrumental featured only a piano, with keyboard accompaniment during the chorus sections. The piano track was recorded solely by May. Queen were backed up by an orchestra arranged by Michael Kamen.

== Critical reception ==
Upon its release, Robin Smith of Record Mirror praised "Who Wants to Live Forever" as "rather wonderful" and a "passionate epic, full to the brim with some glorious effects" and Mercury "bawl[ing] his little heart out". William Shaw, writing for Smash Hits, stated, "What we have here is an enormous orchestra sawing away while Freddie croons with exceptional sensitivity, finally building up to a stupendous climax where they unleash Brian May to do one of his legendary but now sadly rare searing axe solos".

== Music video ==
The music video for "Who Wants to Live Forever" was directed by British director David Mallet and filmed in a (now demolished) warehouse at Tobacco Wharf at London's East End on 16 September 1986. It featured the National Philharmonic Orchestra with forty choirboys and several hundreds of candles which remain lit throughout filming as well as Mercury wearing a tuxedo suit.

An alternate version with clips from the film Highlander (which the song appears in) appears on the video single with "A Kind of Magic" in October 1986 and later as a hidden music video on the Queen Greatest Video Hits II DVD in November 2003.

== Live performances ==
The song was performed by Queen during the 1986 Magic Tour in a D minor key. Live, May would begin playing synthesizer (a Yamaha DX7) before moving to guitar halfway through the song. Also, the live versions feature Freddie Mercury singing the entirety of lead vocals, and John Deacon playing bass guitar (starting at the second verse)—with the song ending after the final lyrics (“Who waits forever anyway?”) without the orchestra-and-guitar flourish of the studio version.

== Track listing ==
- 7-inch single

A1. "Who Wants to Live Forever" (Single Version) – 4:01
B1. "Killer Queen" – 2:59

- 12-inch single

A1. "Who Wants to Live Forever" (Single Version) – 4:01
A2. "Killer Queen" – 2:59
B1. "Who Wants to Live Forever" (Album Version) – 5:15
B2. "Forever" – 3:20

== Personnel ==
Queen

- Freddie Mercury – lead and backing vocals
- Brian May – lead and backing vocals, synthesiser, guitars, orchestral arrangements
- Roger Taylor – drums, drum machine, backing vocals

Additional musicians

- Michael Kamen – orchestral arrangements, conductor
- National Philharmonic Orchestra – strings, brass and percussion

== Charts ==
=== Weekly charts ===
Chart (1986–1992)	Peak position
Australia (ARIA)	165
Belgium (Ultratop 50 Flanders)	44
Netherlands (Dutch Top 40)	7
Netherlands (Single Top 100)	6
UK Singles (Official Charts)	24
West Germany (GfK)	52

=== Year-end charts ===
Chart (1992)	Position
Netherlands (Dutch Top 40)	63
Netherlands (Single Top 100)	59

== Certifications ==
Region	Certification	Certified units/sales
Italy (FIMI) sales since 2009	Gold	35,000^{‡}
New Zealand (RMNZ)	Gold	15,000^{‡}
United Kingdom (BPI) sales since 2011	Platinum	600,000^{‡}
^{‡} Sales+streaming figures based on certification alone.

== Legacy ==
=== Tributes ===
- Seal performed a live version of this song at The Freddie Mercury Tribute Concert held at Wembley Stadium in April 1992 five months after Mercury's death. He said the song made him cry when he first heard it. Thomas Curtis-Horsfall of Smooth Radio stated Seal's performance of the song was "one of the standout moments" from the concert, adding "his spine-tingling rendition of the Queen classic had everyone in the arena close to tears."
- The song serves as the opening track for Diana, Princess of Wales: Tribute, a double CD released on 2 December 1997 in memory of Princess Diana three months after her death.
- Closing the Isle of Wight Festival in England on 12 June 2016, Queen + Adam Lambert performed the song as a tribute to the victims of the mass shooting at a gay nightclub in Orlando, Florida earlier that day.

=== Funeral music ===
In a 2005 poll conducted by digital television station Music Choice on what song Britons would most like played at their funeral, the song was voted the fifth most popular.

=== In other media ===
The song serves as the closing track of Episode 3 of Russell T Davies' AIDS drama It's a Sin (set in 1986), and was used for the post-credits scene for the Rick and Morty season 5 episode "Mortyplicity". Most recently, the song was used in the final trailer for season 5 of the TV show Stranger Things. A remix version was also released on November 7, 2025.

== Dune version ==
"Who Wants to Live Forever"

Single by Dune

from the album Forever
- Released: October 1996
- Genre: Classical
- Length: 3:54
- Label: Orbit; Virgin
- Songwriter: Brian May
- Producers: Bernd Burhoff; Jens Oettrich

Dune singles chronology
"Million Miles from Home" (1996)	"Who Wants to Live Forever" (1996)	"Nothing Compares 2 U" (1997)

Music video
- "Who Wants to Live Forever" on YouTube

German band Dune released their cover of "Who Wants to Live Forever" in October 1996, by Orbit and Virgin Records, as the first single from their third album, Forever (1997). It is produced by Bernd Burhoff and Jens Oettrich, recorded in Abbey Road Studios in London, and features German singer Verena von Strenge and the London Session Orchestra. The single peaked at number two in Germany for two weeks, receiving a platinum certification after selling more than 500,000 copies in Germany alone. It was also a top-10 hit in Austria, Hungary and Switzerland and a top-20 hit in the Netherlands. On the Eurochart Hot 100, it reached number 13 in January 1997. "Who Wants to Live Forever" was nominated to the 1997 Echo Awards for the most successful national dance single.

=== Music video ===
The accompanying music video for "Who Wants to Live Forever" was directed by Swedish-based director Matt Broadley and was shot in the Scottish Highlands. The video begins in an old churchyard, where Oliver Froning of Dune plays a man standing by a grave. He then sees Verena von Strenge appearing in ghost-like form, dressed in a white dress, singing to him. When Froning leaves the graveyard, he walks into the highlands. By a river, he stops for drinking some water, and again sees von Strenge standing in front of a waterfall, singing to him. In the end, he reaches the top of the mountains, where he is united with von Strenge.

=== Track listing ===
1. "Who Wants to Live Forever" (Sixtysix radio mix) (3:54)
2. "Who Wants to Live Forever" (South Bound mix) (3:58)
3. Highland Trilogy: One Day in Glencoe (4:49)
4. Highland Trilogy: Valley of Tears (4:58)
5. Highland Trilogy: In the Air, Part 2 (10:29)

=== Charts ===
==== Weekly charts ====
Chart (1996–1997)	Peak position
Austria (Ö3 Austria Top 40)	3
Europe (Eurochart Hot 100)	13
Europe (European Dance Radio)	13
Germany (GfK)	2
Hungary (Mahasz)	8
Netherlands (Dutch Top 40)	9
Netherlands (Single Top 100)	12
Scotland (OCC)	65
Sweden (Sverigetopplistan)	59
Switzerland (Schweizer Hitparade)	9
UK Singles (OCC)	77

==== Year-end charts ====
Chart (1996)	Position
Germany (Media Control)	44

Chart (1997)	Position
Austria (Ö3 Austria Top 40)	31
Europe (Eurochart Hot 100)	89
Germany (Media Control)	49

=== Certifications ===
Region	Certification	Certified units/sales
Germany (BVMI)	Platinum	500,000^{^}
^{^} Shipments figures based on certification alone.

== Sarah Brightman version ==
"Who Wants to Live Forever"

Single by Sarah Brightman

from the album Timeless
- Released: 1997
- Genre: Operatic pop
- Label: East West
- Songwriter: Brian May
- Producer: Frank Peterson

Sarah Brightman singles chronology
"Just Show Me How to Love You" (1997)	"Who Wants to Live Forever" (1997)	"Tu Quieres Volver" (1997)

British soprano Sarah Brightman released her cover of "Who Wants to Live Forever" as a single by East West Records in 1997 from her fifth album, Timeless/Time to Say Goodbye (1997). It was produced by Frank Peterson and peaked at No. 45 in the UK Singles Chart.

=== Track listing ===
- CD single
1. "Who Wants to Live Forever" (Album version)
2. "Who Wants to Live Forever" (Xenomania club mix)
- Maxi CD single
1. "Who Wants to Live Forever"
2. "A Question of Honour"
3. "Heaven Is Here"
4. "I Loved You"
- 12" vinyl
1. "Who Wants to Live Forever (Trouser Enthusiasts 'Cybernetic Odalisque' Mix)"
2. "Who Wants to Live Forever (Xenomania Club Mix)"
3. "Who Wants to Live Forever (Xenomania Dub Mix)"
4. "Who Wants to Live Forever (X-Citing Mix)

=== Charts ===
Chart (1997)	Peak position
Scotland (OCC)	43
UK Singles (OCC)	45

== Other notable covers ==
- In 2002, Dutch symphonic metal band After Forever recorded a cover of the song as the B-side of their second single "Emphasis". The track can be found as a bonus track on the band's second studio album Decipher.
- In 2009, Welsh singer Katherine Jenkins recorded her cover version for her studio album Believe.
- In 2025, Italian soprano Giorgia Fumanti released a single version of the song, and it appeared on her album Cinema II.
