= There for Me (La Bionda song) =

1978 song by La Bionda

Song by La Bionda

from the album La Bionda
- Released: 1978
- Label: Baby
- Songwriters: Carmelo La Bionda; Michelangelo La Bionda; Richard Palmer-James; Charly Ricanek
- Producer: Baby Records

La Bionda singles chronology
"Baby Make Love" (1978)	"One for You, One for Me" / "There for Me" (1978)	"Sandstorm" (1978)

Audio
- "There for Me" on YouTube

"There for Me" is a song composed by Angelo La Bionda, Carmelo La Bionda and Charly Ricanek. It originally appeared on the eponymous album of Italian disco duo La Bionda, which was released in 1978. It was notably covered several times by artist Sarah Brightman. There is also a French cover from 1981, by the singer Dalida, called "Fini, La Comédie".

== Sarah Brightman version ==
"There for Me"

Single by Sarah Brightman

from the album Timeless
- Released: 1998
- Studio: Abbey Road Studios (London, England); Nemo Studios (Hamburg, Germany)
- Label: East West
- Songwriters: Angelo La Bionda, Carmelo La Bionda and Charly Ricanek
- Producer: Frank Peterson

Sarah Brightman singles chronology
"Tu Quieres Volver" (1997)	"There for Me" (1998)	"Eden" (1998)

Sarah Brightman & José Cura singles chronology
"Just Show Me How to Love You" (1997)	"There For Me" (1998)

Sarah Brightman's cover of this song first appeared on her Timeless album, featuring José Cura, and was released in 1997. It was also released as a single, with "O mio babbino caro" as the B-side track. Often on her 2000/2001 La Luna tour, Brightman would perform this duet with Josh Groban, and this was included in the La Luna: Live in Concert DVD.

Brightman and Cantonese entertainer Jacky Cheung sang "There For Me" in the city of Hong Kong on stage, at the Hong Kong Millennium Extravaganza.

While the duet with José Cura version of this song is bilingual, the other two versions are completely in English.

== Hayley Westenra and Paul Potts version ==
Hayley Westenra and Britain's Got Talent winner Paul Potts recorded "There For Me" in Italian, as "Sei Con Me", for Potts' second album, Passione, released in 2009.
