= Dune 3 =

Dune 3, Dune III, or Dune: Part Three may refer to:

- Dune: Part Three, a 2026 film project by director Denis Villeneuve based on the 1969 novel Dune Messiah.
- Children of Dune, a 1976 novel by Frank Herbert, the third novel in the Dune series
- Dune III, a 1909 painting by Piet Mondrian that features divisionism

== See also ==
- Dune 2000, a 1998 video game, the third entry in the Virgin Interactive "Dune" video game series
- Emperor: Battle for Dune, a 2001 video game, narratively the third game in the Virgin Interactive "Dune" video game series
- Dune (disambiguation)
