= Expedicion =

Studio album by Dune
- Released: April 1996
- Length: 56:49
- Label: Orbit Records

Dune chronology
Dune (1995)	Expedicion (1996)	Live! (1996)

Expedicion is the second album by German band Dune. It was released in 1996 on the label Orbit Records. There is a sample of Leonard Nimoy's voice as Spock from the 1979 film Star Trek: The Motion Picture saying "No doubt a sensor-transceiver combination, recording everything we say and do" on the song "In The Air Part 2".

The singer, although not credited, is Verena von Strenge, Dune's lead singer at the time.

== Track listing ==
1. "Rising" – 0:25
2. "Million Miles from Home" – 4:22
3. "Expedicion" – 5:26
4. "Lost in Space" – 4:44
5. "So Beautiful" – 6:37
6. "Around the World" – 4:52
7. "In the Air Part 1" – 5:13
8. "Rainbow to the Stars" – 4:54
9. "In My Dreams" – 5:10
10. "Hand in Hand" – 4:32
11. "In the Air Part 2" – 10:29

== Charts ==
=== Weekly charts ===
Chart (1996)	Peak position
Austrian Albums (Ö3 Austria)	43
Dutch Albums (Album Top 100)	34
Finnish Albums (Suomen virallinen lista)	38
German Albums (Offizielle Top 100)	15
Hungarian Albums (MAHASZ)	4
Swiss Albums (Schweizer Hitparade)	28

=== Year-end charts ===
Chart (1996)	Position
German Albums (Offizielle Top 100)	99
