= Clive Barda =

British photographer

Clive Barda OBE
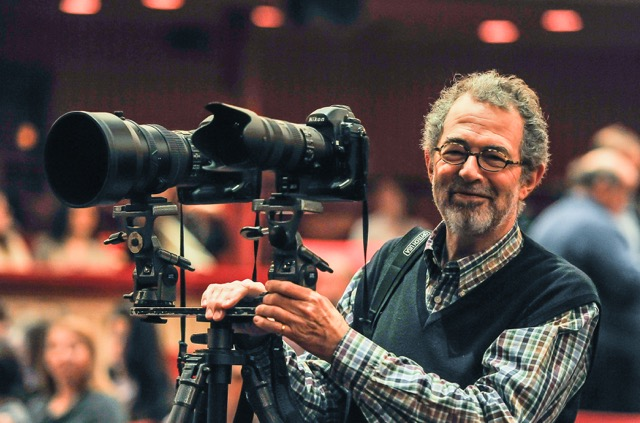
- Barda in 2014
- Born: 14 January 1945 (age 81)
- Occupation: Photographer
- Years active: 1968–present
- Spouse: Rosalind Mary Whiteley (m. 1970)
- Children: 3 sons
- Awards: OBE
- Website: www.clivebarda.com

Clive Blackmore Barda (born 14 January 1945) is a London-based, British freelance photographer best known for capturing the performances of classical musicians and artists of the stage (opera, ballet and theatre). During his career spanning over five decades, Barda has created a collection of over a million photographs of performers, composers, and conductors.

== Early life ==
Barda was born in 1945 and spent his early childhood in Alexandria, Egypt, where his father was a lawyer and his mother a painter. The family returned to England in 1956. Barda attended Bryanston School and graduated from Birkbeck College, University of London (BA Hons Modern Langs), aspiring to apply his knowledge of modern languages as a commodities broker in the City. His early interest in photography was mostly documentary; while studying for his degree, he travelled to Romania to photograph the painted monasteries of Moldavia. When he was twenty, following a friend's suggestion, he attended his first concert of classical music: an evening of Viennese music conducted by John Barbirolli. Soon after, he started attending concerts several times per week, and listening regularly to BBC Radio 3.

== Career ==
Barda decided to combine his interests in photography and classical music, and a chance encounter with a journalist for South Wales Magazine led to his first commission: photographing the harpist Susan Drake at home, on 12 November 1968. At the time, Drake's husband, John Wilbraham, was recording the Haydn and Hummel trumpet concertos and the producer asked Barda to shoot the album's sleeve. Drake then showed Barda's work to her agent, who recommended him to other artists, thus opening up opportunities for further engagements. Within a few months, Barda had his big break:

In 1969, I went to a concert at London's South Bank, where pianist Daniel Barenboim and the cellist Jacqueline du Pré were playing Beethoven sonatas. (...) Barenboim was the most famous musician I had come close to and I decided to ask if I could photograph him conducting. To my amazement, Barenboim said "OK".

— Clive Barda, Performance! Musicians in Photographs, "An Interview with Clive Barda" by Graeme Kay

The rehearsal took place at the Queen Elizabeth Hall the following Tuesday, and Barda showed the resulting contact sheets to Barenboim a few days later, in the Royal Festival Hall's green room. There, he also met Peter Andry, a senior executive at EMI, who suggested that Barda show his pictures to the art department at EMI. This immediately led to Barda's first major commission: to photograph Yehudi Menuhin, at EMI's No. 1 Studio, Abbey Road.

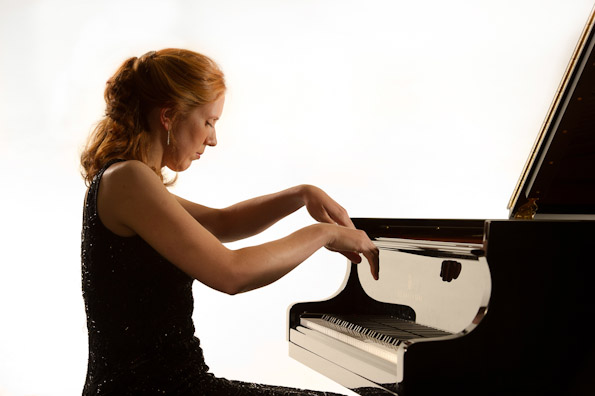
Sarah Beth Briggs (29 September 2010) by Barda

During the following decades, Barda has portrayed the world's leading classical musicians, as well as performers in opera, dance, theatre and musicals, as a freelance photographer. In her review of Barda's book Performance! (2000) for The Guardian, Charlotte Higgins stated:

Over the past 30 years, Barda has photographed anyone who is anyone in music, from late, great luminaries such as Lucia Popp, Olivier Messiaen, Benjamin Britten and Charles Groves to today's young stars such as Evgeny Kissin, David Daniels and Cecilia Bartoli.

— Charlotte Higgins, The classical picture show

Barda has been closely associated with major British locations, such as the Barbican Hall, Edinburgh International Festival, English National Opera, Glyndebourne Festival Opera, Her Majesty's Theatre, National Theatre, Opera North, Queen Elizabeth Hall, Queen's Hall, Royal Albert Hall, Royal Festival Hall, Royal Lyceum Theatre, Royal Opera House, Royal Shakespeare Company at Stratford-upon-Avon, St John's, Smith Square, Usher Hall, and Welsh National Opera.

He has also worked abroad: in Austria, France, Germany, Italy, Japan, the Netherlands, Russia, the U.S., and China. He has taken photographs during rehearsals and recordings in the studios of AIR Studios, the BBC, CBS, EMI's Abbey Road Studios, Olympic Studios, among others, as well as at the home venues of major orchestras such as the LSO.

By 2012, Barda had already produced more than a million photographs, and has been referred to as the doyen of British music photography.

== Method ==
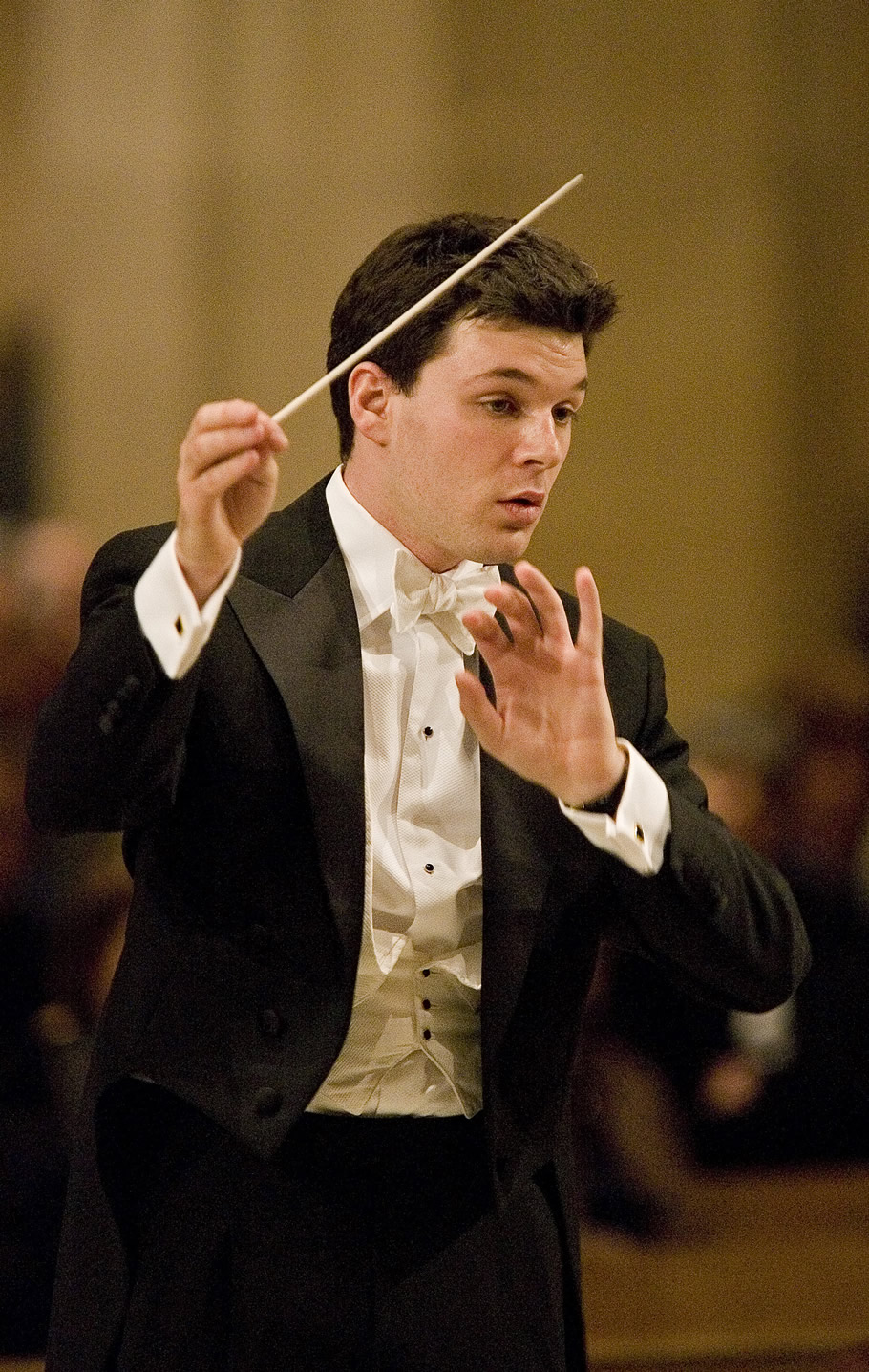
Scott Ellaway conducting the Philharmonia Orchestra in Guildford (18 March 2006) by Barda

When commissioned for a project, Barda asks what music will be played, since it is his understanding of the piece that will enable him to anticipate the decisive split second at which a good picture might be taken. As he explained: "Music is constantly punctuated. (...) There are narrative passages, there are peaks and troughs. The pictures occur at the peaks, the climaxes. Even if you don't know the music—though it helps if you do—you develop a sixth sense for these highs."

Vladimir Ashkenazy has stated that one of the secrets of Barda's success "is his rare gift of being unnoticed, discreet and unobtrusive while doing his work."

The fact that I often spent hours with the artists and was perceived as a member of the recording team fed into my work in a number of ways (...) bolstering my sense of affinity with the musicians and their work.

— Clive Barda, Performance! Musicians in Photographs, "An Interview with Clive Barda" by Graeme Kay

== Personal life ==
In 1970, Barda married Rosalind Mary Whiteley; they have three sons.

== Exhibitions ==
After a decade as a professional photographer, Barda began to exhibit his work, in the UK and abroad:

- 1979 – An Eye for an Ear. Royal Festival Hall, London (1 March – 8 April 1979)
- 1980 – An Eye for an Ear. Manchester, England
- 1981 – An Eye for an Ear. Perth, Australia (7 February – 2 March 1981)
- 1981 – An Eye for an Ear. Adelaide, Australia
- 1985 – Science Museum, London (with Lord Snowdon and Patrick Lichfield)
- 1985 – Royal Photographic Society, Bath, England (with Lord Snowdon and Patrick Lichfield)
- 1988 – Solo exhibition at the National Museum of Photography, Film and Television, Bradford, England
- 1996 – Bravura! Wigmore Hall, London (9 March – 10 April 1996)
- 1996 – Music to the Eye. Inaugural exhibition at Nagaoka Lyric Hall, Japan (3 November – 23 December 1996)
- 2001 – Edinburgh International Festival, Scotland
- 2001 – Cheltenham Literary Festival, England
- 2001 – Baroco Gallery, Paris, France
- 2003 – Black & White Photography. The Van Ludwig Art Gallery, Dorking, England (17 May – 22 June 2003)
- 2005 – Permanent exhibition Wigmore Hall, London
- 2012 – Exposure!:
  - Guangzhou Opera House (31 March-1 July 2012), China
  - National Centre for the Performing Arts in Beijing (5-19 April 2012), China
  - Hangzhou Grand Theatre (10 April-10 May 2012), China
  - Cambridge Summer Music Festival (17-22 July 2012), England
  - Royal Opera House at Thurrock (14-20 October 2012), England
  - Tap Seac Gallery (1 November-9 December 2012), Macao
- 2013 – Music in Focus. Ealing Music and Film Valentine Festival (14-17 February 2013)

== Collections ==
In 1990, Barda founded the Performing Arts Library (PAL), to showcase his own collection and the work of other photographers specializing in the arts. This project evolved into ArenaPAL in 1997.

Barda's work is also held in the following public collections:

- National Media Museum in Bradford, England
- Wigmore Hall, in London
- National Portrait Gallery in London

== Publications ==
=== Books by Barda ===
- Barda, Clive (1996). Celebration! Edinburgh International Festival. 50 Years In Photos. Edinburgh: Edinburgh Festival Society. ASIN B00164U1LW.
- — (2000). Performance! Musicians in Photographs. London: Peter Biddulph. ISBN 978-09520109-4-4.

=== Books with contributions by Barda ===
- Hughes, Graham (1974). Sculpture of David Wynne, 1968-74. Photographs by Clive Barda. London: Phaidon Press. ISBN 978-0-7148-1653-1.
- Perry, George (1987). The Complete Phantom of the Opera. Photographs by Clive Barda. (first ed.). London: Pavilion Books. ISBN 978-1-85145-226-2.
- Ganzl, Kurt (1990). The Complete Aspects of Love. Photographs by Clive Barda. (first ed.). London: Penguin Books. ISBN 978-0-670-83192-0.
- Hart, Charles (1990). The Phantom of the Opera Theatre Programme - Her Majesty's Theatre. Photographs by Clive Barda. London: Cameron Mackintosh. ASIN B005QB1C0K.
- Leech, Caroline (2006). Welsh National Opera: Celebrating the First 60 Years. Photographs by Clive Barda. Cardiff: Graffeg. ISBN 978-1-905582-00-6.
- Kahn, Gary (2012). The Power of The Ring - Der Ring des Nibelungen at the Royal Opera House. Photographs by Clive Barda. London: Royal Opera House. ISBN 978-0-946338-04-7.

=== Selected exhibition catalogues ===
- Barda, Clive (2012). Exposure! Retrospective Photographic Exhibition. London: Orange Advertising.
- — (14 February 2013). Music in Focus — The Ealing Valentine Festival of Music & Film. London.

== Filmography ==
- Trailer for Philippe Monnet's Clive Barda - Photographer (2012)

== Honours ==
- Fellow of the Royal Society of Arts.
- OBE in the 2016 New Year Honours list, for services to photography.
- Honorary fellowship of the Musicians' Company, July 2016.

== See also ==
- List of photographs by Clive Barda
