= La Bionda (album) =

1978 studio album by La Bionda

Studio album by La Bionda
- Released: 1978
- Studio: Country Lane (Munich)
- Genre: Disco
- Length: 28:21
- Label: Baby Records
- Producer: Carmelo La Bionda

La Bionda chronology
Tutto va bene (1977)	La Bionda (1978)	Bandido (1979)

Singles from La Bionda
- 1. "One for You, One for Me" Released: 1978

La Bionda is the fourth studio album by Italian disco duo La Bionda, released in 1978, by Baby Records. It includes the single "One for You, One for Me".

== Track listing ==
All tracks are written by La Bionda and Richard Palmer-James.

La Bionda – Side one
No.	Title	Writer(s)	Length
1.	"There for Me"	Michelangelo La Bionda; Carmelo La Bionda; Richard Palmer-James; Charly Ricanek	3:22
2.	"One for You, One for Me"	M. La Bionda; C. La Bionda; Palmer-James	5:56
3.	"Hey Woman"	M. La Bionda; C. La Bionda; Palmer-James	5:02
Total length:			14:20

La Bionda – Side two
No.	Title	Writer(s)	Length
1.	"Sandstorm"	M. La Bionda; C. La Bionda; Palmer-James; Ricanek	10:06
2.	"Song for Smokey and the Bandit"	M. La Bionda; C. La Bionda; Palmer-James	3:55
Total length:			14:01

== Personnel ==
- Claudia Schwarz, Jerry Rix, Maria Neuhaus, Peter Bishop, Renate Maurer: Choir and Vocals
- Freddy Protz, Richard W. Palmer-James: Electric and Acoustic Guitars
- Charly Ricanek: Keyboards, Acoustic and Electric Piano, ARP synthesizer
- Gary Unwin: Bass
- Martin Harrison: Drums, Percussion
- Benny Gebauer, Giuseppe Solera: Saxophone
- George Delagay, Robert Meisner: Trombone
- Ettiene Kut, George Rotzer, Walther Raab: Trumpet
- Fritz Sonuleitner and his "Bavarian Strings": String arrangements and conducting

== Charts ==
=== Weekly charts ===
Chart (1978)	Peak position
Australian Albums (Kent Music Report)	75
Austrian Albums (Ö3 Austria)	19
Dutch Albums (Album Top 100)	30
German Albums (Offizielle Top 100)	10
Italian Albums (Musica e dischi)	5
Swedish Albums (Sverigetopplistan)	33
