= Alan Bergman (dancer) =

American ballet dancer and photographer (1943–2010)

Alan Bergman (1943 – September 24, 2010) was an American ballet dancer, photographer and businessman.

He was the product of two generations of Russian/Polish Yiddish actors: Glicka and Morris Balavsky, co-founders of Nordska Films, the Actors Studio and his mother, Miriam, a child star in the Yiddish theater.

== Dance career ==
At age 8 years Alan Bergman was spotted by Andre Eglevsky, who took Bergman on as his protégé and taught him privately for two years. When Bergman was 10 years old Eglevsky took him to George Balanchine’s School of American Ballet where he was offered a full scholarship. Bergman’s teacher’s were Anatole Oboukoff, Pierre Vladimirov, (the partner of Anna Pavlova and contemporary of Vaslav Nijinsky), and Felia Doubrovska. He was also coached by Olga Preobrajenska and studied with Alexandra Danilova. By age 15, Bergman was dancing soloist roles and soon became a principal dancer with a number of major companies such as the San Francisco Ballet and a Guest Artist with companies such as The National Ballet of Venezuela.

Bergman also danced as a principal in revivals of Broadway shows including Annie Get Your Gun, where he partnered Ginger Rogers. A severe injury brought Alan Bergman’s dancing career to an abrupt halt.

== Photography ==
After his injury, Bergman went on to become a successful dance and theatre photographer. His work has been widely exhibited nationally and internationally in solo and traveling exhibitions. His images are currently displayed in six museums including the National Portrait Gallery, Washington, DC, the National Portrait Gallery, London, where a number were on show as of 2006 as part of the Royal Ballet's 75th Anniversary, and the Theatre Museum, London.

Bergman also has a collection with ArenaPAL, the Performing Arts Image Library.

== Dans-ez International ==
Bergman is CEO of Dans-ez, a company that makes bras.

== Personal life ==
In 1998 Bergman married his wife Samantha, who gave birth to their daughter Alexia in the year 2000. On September 24, 2010, Bergman died suddenly of a heart attack.
