= Forever (Dune album) =

Studio album by Dune
- Released: January 1997
- Length: 58:37
- Label: Orbit Records

Dune chronology
| Live! (1996) | Forever (1997) | Forever and Ever (1998) |

Forever is the fourth album by German band Dune. It was released in 1997 on the label Orbit Records. The album is very different from the other albums released, because the style is classical. It contains covers of famous pop songs and was recorded with the London Session Orchestra at the famous Abbey Road Studios in London.

The singer, although not credited, is Verena von Strenge, Dune's lead singer at the time.

AllMusic remarked, "Take away the orchestra and Forever wouldn't sound too different from a night of karaoke."

== Track listing ==
Forever track listing
| No. | Title | Length |
|---|---|---|
| 1. | "Who Wants to Live Forever" (original by Queen) | 3:54 |
| 2. | "9pm Abbey Road" | 2:06 |
| 3. | "Somebody" (original by Depeche Mode) | 3:57 |
| 4. | "One Moment" | 2:01 |
| 5. | "Against All Odds" (original by Phil Collins) | 3:52 |
| 6. | "The Promise" | 2:05 |
| 7. | "Sea Song" (original by Robert Wyatt) | 3:47 |
| 8. | "Little Princess" | 2:37 |
| 9. | "The Power of Love" (original by Frankie Goes to Hollywood) | 5:20 |
| 10. | "Works" | 2:07 |
| 11. | "Nothing Compares 2 U" (original by Prince) | 4:52 |
| 12. | "Variations" | 2:58 |
| 13. | "Hide and Seek" (original by Howard Jones) | 5:10 |
| 14. | "Forever" | 3:50 |
| 15. | "Winter Kills" (original by Yazoo) | 4:56 |
| 16. | "Reprise" | 5:00 |
| Total length: | | 62:32 |

== Charts ==
=== Weekly charts ===
| Chart (1997) | Peak position |
|---|---|
| Hungarian Albums (MAHASZ) | 19 |
