= One for You, One for Me =

1978 single by La Bionda

- German vinyl single picture sleeve

Single by La Bionda

from the album La Bionda
- B-side: "There for Me"
- Released: 1978
- Genre: Disco
- Length: 3:04
- Label: Baby
- Songwriters: Carmelo La Bionda; Michelangelo La Bionda; Richard Palmer-James
- Producer: Baby Records

La Bionda singles chronology
"Baby Make Love" (1978)	"One for You, One for Me" (1978)	"Sandstorm" (1978)

Music video
- "One for You, One for Me" on YouTube

"One for You, One for Me" is a song by the Italian disco duo La Bionda from their 1978 album La Bionda. It was written by Carmelo La Bionda, Michelangelo La Bionda and Richard Palmer-James.

== Track listing and formats ==
- German 7-inch single

A. "One for You, One for Me" – 3:04
B. "There for Me" – 3:22

== Credits and personnel ==
- Carmelo La Bionda – songwriter, vocals
- Michelangelo La Bionda – songwriter, vocals
- Richard Palmer-James – songwriter
- Harry Thumann – engineering
- Matthias Härtl – engineering
- Charly Ricanek – arranger

Credits and personnel adapted from the La Bionda album and 7-inch single liner notes.

== Cover version ==
In 1985 Mark Spiro covered this song with different lyrics and some Synthesizer-sounds.

== Charts ==
=== Weekly charts ===
Weekly chart performance for "One for You, One for Me"
Chart (1978)	Peak position
Austria (Ö3 Austria Top 40)	5
Belgium (Ultratop 50 Wallonia)	1
Italy (Musica e dischi)	9
Netherlands (Single Top 100)	7
Sweden (Sverigetopplistan)	11
Switzerland (Schweizer Hitparade)	3
UK Singles (OCC)	54
West Germany (GfK)	2

=== Year-end charts ===
Year-end chart performance for "One for You, One for Me"
Chart (1978)	Position
Belgium (Ultratop 50 Flanders)	28
Netherlands (Dutch Top 40)	56
West Germany (Official German Charts)	15

== In popular culture ==
The song was featured in the end credits for The Brutalist (2024).
