= Simon Annand =

British photographer

- Born: London
- Occupation: Author

Simon Annand is a British, London-based photographer and the author of 'The Half – Photographs of actors preparing for the stage'.

The book features images of recognized actors in their dressing rooms over 25 years of British Theatre. and was published by Faber and Faber. It has been exhibited at The National Theatre, the V&A Museum, Arles, South Africa and Scarborough.

Annand is also a theatre production photographer. He began his career working at London's Old Vic Theatre under Jonathan Miller (1987–1989). He has since provided images for London's productions of War Horse and Jerusalem. He has worked for London's Almeida, Royal Court, Hampstead, Bush and Gate Theatres as well as the RSC.
