= Dune (band) =

German electronic music group

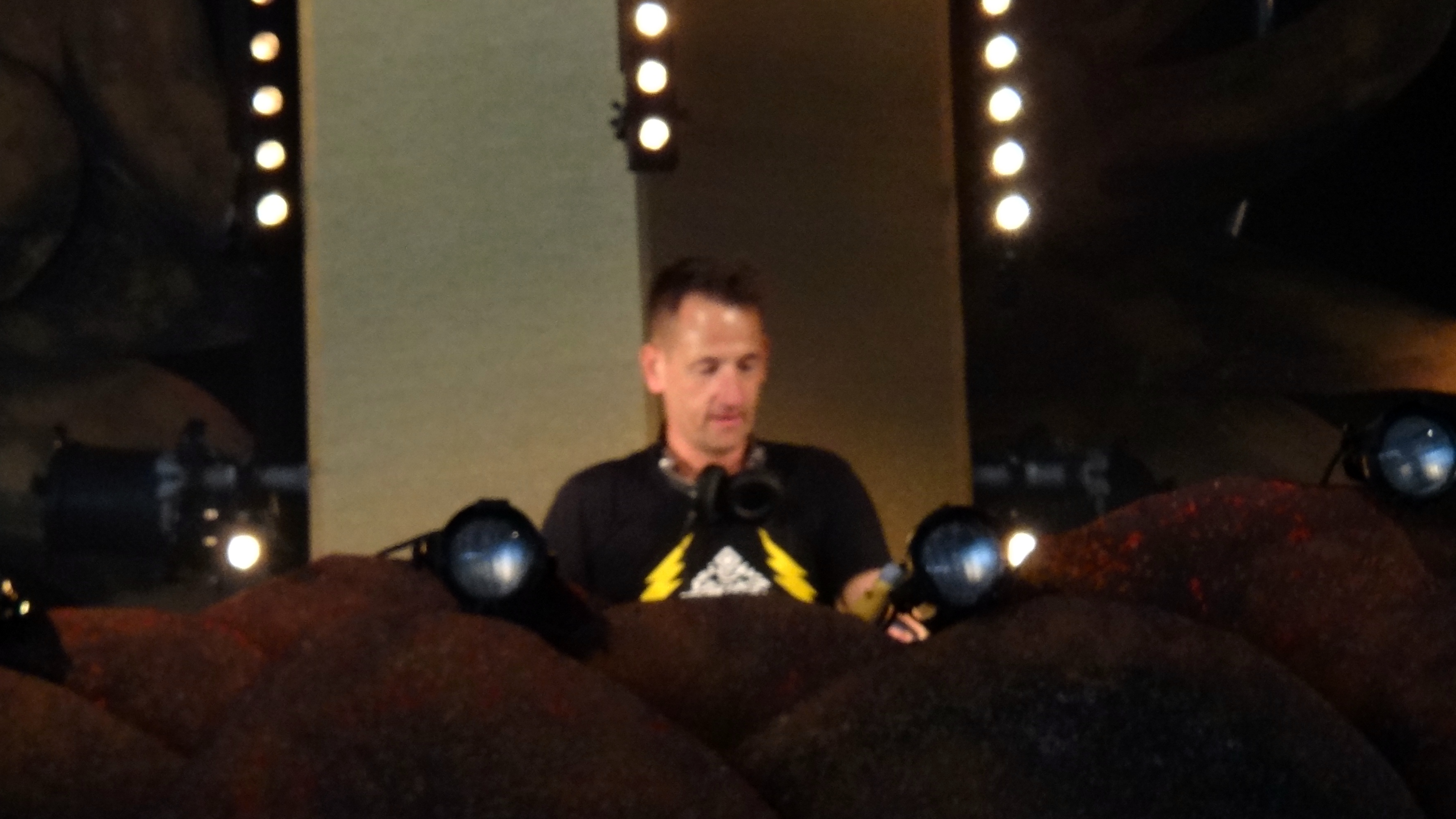
- Oliver Froning performing as Dune at Defqon.1 in 2015

Background information
- Origin: Münster, Germany
- Genres: EDM, Techno, Happy hardcore
- Years active: 1995–present
- Members: Oliver Froning
- Past members: Jens Oettrich; Bernd Burhoff; Tina Lacebal; Verena von Strenge; Vanessa Hörster
- Website: dune.dance

Dune is a German electronic music group known for songs such as "Hardcore Vibes", "Can't Stop Raving", "Are You Ready to Fly", and "Rainbow to the Stars".

== History ==
The group was founded in 1995 by DJ Oliver Froning and producers Jens Oettrich and Bernd Burhoff (alias Plutone). The band's name was inspired by the science fiction film Dune, based on Frank Herbert's novel of the same name. They released "Hardcore Vibes", a largely instrumental track featuring spoken words by Froning's niece, and a cover version of Rozalla's song "Are You Ready to Fly" as their first two singles. These were followed in mid-1995 by the group's eponymous debut album, released through Urban Records. An instrumental track from the album, "Can't Stop Raving", became the third single, enhanced with heavily pitched-up vocals by singer Tina Lagao. All three singles reached the Swiss, German, and Dutch charts.

In early 1996, dancer Verena von Strenge became the group's main singer. The second album, Expedicion, released that same year, produced the singles "Rainbow to the Stars", "Hand in Hand", and "Million Miles from Home". The latter was selected as Germany's anthem for the 30th anniversary of Star Trek.

In early 1997, Dune made a significant shift in their musical style. Accompanied by the London Session Orchestra, the band produced a cover of Queen's "Who Wants to Live Forever", which reached second place on the German charts. They followed this with the release of a new album, Forever, which included covers of popular hits such as Phil Collins' "Against All Odds", Sinéad O'Connor's "Nothing Compares 2 U", and Frankie Goes to Hollywood's "The Power of Love". However, internal disagreements led to the departure of Verena von Strenge.

The single "Keep the Secret", released on 20 April 1998, marked the debut of a new vocalist, Vanessa Hörster. The music video for the track "Electric Heaven" was directed by Eric Will and filmed on the Côte d'Azur in France. Both singles did not achieve commercial success, resulting in the cancellation of the album 5, which had been planned for release in August 1998. Another classical album, Forever and Ever, recorded in collaboration with the London Session Orchestra and featuring former vocalist Tina Lagao (performing here under the stage name 'Tina Lacebal'), was released on 23 November 1998, but also flopped commercially.

At the end of 1999, the group reunited with Verena von Strenge and released the single "Dark Side of the Moon", which reached 49 on the German charts. The group began recording songs for an album titled Reunion.

Dune recorded "Heaven", a cover version of A7's 1999 hit "Piece of Heaven", under the (false) impression that they had obtained permission from the original artist. However, prior to the single's release, A7 lodged a court order alleging plagiarism. Dune was forced to cancel the release of "Heaven", and they could not release their album Reunion due to the court order. Songs that had already been recorded for the Reunion album, except for "Heaven", were later released on the album History. After remakes of "Hardcore Vibes" (2000) and "Rainbow to the Stars" (2003), the group quietly disbanded.

Oliver Froning later continued his career as a solo artist under the Dune moniker and, since 2014, frequently appeared as a DJ. In 2016, he released "Magic Carpet Ride", featuring vocals by Kate Wild. Froning's use of the Dune name is currently the subject of a legal dispute between him and Burhoff.

In 2017, the single "Starchild (First Contact – Chapter One)" was released, followed by "Utopia", "We're Alive", and "Turn the Tide" in 2018.

== Members ==
- Oliver Froning (1995–present)
- Jens Oettrich (1995–2003)
- Bernd Burhoff (1995–2003)
- Verena von Strenge (1996–1997, 1999–2000)
- Vanessa Hörster (1998)
- Tina Lacebal (1995–1996, 1998)

== Discography ==
=== Albums ===
Year	Title	Chart positions					
Year	Title	GER	AUT	NED	FIN	HU	SWI
1995	Dune	21	–	59	–	36	20
1996	Expedicion	15	43	34	38	4	28
1996	Live!	89	–	45	–	–	–
1997	Forever	2	4	63	–	19	11
1998	Forever and Ever	–	–	–	–	–	–
2000	History	69	–	–	–	–	–
"–" denotes releases that did not chart.

=== Singles ===
"Rainbow to the Stars" (1996)
As the ending track for Dancemania 2

Year	Title	Chart positions							Album
Year	Title	GER	AUT	SWI	NED	SWE	FIN	UK	Album
1995	"Hardcore Vibes"	5	–	36	10	–	–	–	Dune
1995	"Are You Ready to Fly"	12	–	23	17	–	–	–	Dune
1995	"Can't Stop Raving"	7	–	16	10	–	–	–	Dune
1996	"Rainbow to the Stars"	12	–	23	8	52	7	–	Expedicion
1996	"Hand in Hand"	10	39	18	9	–	–	77	Expedicion
1996	"Million Miles from Home"	17	–	39	10	40	–	–	Expedicion
1996	"Who Wants to Live Forever"	2	3	9	12	59	–	77	Forever
1997	"Nothing Compares 2 U"	–	36	–	–	–	–	–	Forever
1997	"Somebody" (promo only)	–	–	–	–	–	–	–	Forever
1998	"Keep the Secret"	38	–	–	–	–	–	–	Singles only
1998	"Electric Heaven"	56	–	50	–	–	–	–	Singles only
1998	"One of Us"	78	–	–	–	–	–	–	Forever & Ever
1999	"Dark Side of the Moon"	49	–	–	–	–	–	–	History
2000	"Heaven" (promo only)	–	–	–	–	–	–	–	Promo only
2000	"Hardcore Vibes 2000"	70	–	–	–	–	–	–	History
2003	"Rainbow to the Stars 2003"	74	–	–	–	–	–	–	Singles only
2016	"Magic Carpet Ride"	–	–	–	–	–	–	–	Singles only
2017	"Starchild"	–	–	–	–	–	–	–	Singles only
2018	"Utopia"	–	–	–	–	–	–	–	Singles only
2018	"We're Alive"	–	–	–	–	–	–	–	Singles only
2018	"Turn the Tide"	–	–	–	–	–	–	–	Singles only
2022	"Running Up That Hill"	–	–	–	–	–	–	–	Singles only
"–" denotes releases that did not chart.
