= Dune (Dune album) =

Studio album by Dune
- Released: 31 July 1995
- Recorded: Plutonic Island Studios, Hamburg
- Genre: Happy hardcore
- Length: 60:17
- Label: Motor Music
- Producer: Jens Oettrich, Oliver Froning, Bernd Burhoff

Dune chronology
Dune (1995)	Expedicion (1996)

Dune is the debut album by German band Dune. It was released in 1995 under the label Motor Music. The album achieved a peak position of number 21 in Germany, number 59 in the Netherlands, and number 20 in Switzerland.

== Track listing ==
Dune track listing
No.	Title	Writer(s)	Length
1.	"In the Beginning..."	Bernd Burhoff; Oliver Froning; Jens Oettrich	0:49
2.	"Hardcore Vibes"	Burhoff; Oettrich	3:33
3.	"Just Another Dream"	Burhoff; Froning; Oettrich	4:09
4.	"Future Is Now"	Burhoff; Froning; Oettrich	4:57
5.	"Final Dream"	Burhoff; Froning; Oettrich	4:25
6.	"The Spice"	Burhoff; Froning; Oettrich	4:35
7.	"Are You Ready to Fly"	Nigel Swansston; Tim Cox	3:33
8.	"Can't Stop Raving"	Burhoff; Froning; Oettrich	4:34
9.	"Up!"	Burhoff; Froning; Oettrich	4:29
10.	"Generation Love"	Burhoff; Froning; Oettrich	4:57
11.	"Positiv Energy"	Burhoff; Froning; Oettrich	4:18
12.	"Make Sense"	Burhoff; Froning; Oettrich	5:08
13.	"...In the End"	Burhoff; Froning; Oettrich	10:58
Total length:			60:17

The track "...In the End" is credited with a length of 8:05, but its actual runtime is 10:58. A distorted recording of Tchaikovsky's Piano Concerto No. 1, 2nd Movement can be heard in the final 55 seconds, long after the actual track has faded out into silence.

== Charts ==
=== Weekly charts ===
Chart (1996)	Peak position
Hungarian Albums (MAHASZ)	36
