= Baby Make Love =

1978 single by La Bionda

- Artwork for the German vinyl single release

Single by La Bionda

from the album Bandido
- B-side: "There's No Other Way"
- Released: 1978
- Genre: Disco
- Length: 4:14
- Label: Baby
- Songwriter(s): Carmelo La Bionda; Michelangelo La Bionda; Richard Palmer-James
- Producer(s): Baby Records

La Bionda singles chronology
"Prisoner" (1977)	"Baby Make Love" (1978)	"One for You, One for Me" (1978)

Audio
- "Baby Make Love" on YouTube

"Baby Make Love" is a song by the Italian disco duo La Bionda from their 1979 album Bandido. It was written by Carmelo La Bionda, Michelangelo La Bionda and Richard Palmer-James.

== Track listing and formats ==
- Italian 7-inch single

A. "Baby Make Love" – 4:14
B. "There's No Other Way" – 2:43

== Credits and personnel ==
- Carmelo La Bionda – songwriter, vocals
- Michelangelo La Bionda – songwriter, vocals
- Richard Palmer-James – songwriter
- Harry Thumann – engineering
- Chris Bellman – mastering
- Jürgen Koppers – mixing
- Charly Ricanek – arranger

Credits and personnel adapted from the Bandido album and 7-inch single liner notes.

== Charts ==
=== Weekly charts ===
Weekly chart performance for "Baby Make Love"
Chart (1979)	Peak position
Austria (Ö3 Austria Top 40)	15
Italy (Musica e dischi)	15
Switzerland (Schweizer Hitparade)	7
West Germany (GfK)	18
