= Marina Eglevsky =

American ballet dancer

Marina Eglevsky is an American ballet dancer.

== Early life and career ==
Marina Eglevsky was born in New York City and raised in Massapequa, New York. She is the daughter of ballet star Andre Eglevsky and ballerina Leda Anchutina Eglevsky. Marina studied at the School of American Ballet and the American Ballet Theatre School. Marina performed professionally in New York City Ballet's production of The Nutcracker, with the Eglevsky Ballet Company, and as a guest in various companies and engagements.

At the age of fifteen, Marina Eglevsky joined the Harkness Ballet Company and launched her own successful dance career. She later was principal dancer with the Royal Winnipeg Ballet and the Hamburg Ballet. She danced with dancers such as Mikhail Baryshnikov, Lawrence Rhodes, Helgi Tomasson and skater John Curry. Eglevsky was a featured artist in the Broadway revival production of Brigadoon under the direction of Vivian Matalon and Agnes de Mille.

Marina was taught classical ballet by her parents and legendary dancers such as George Balanchine and choreographer Michel Fokine.
