= Edwin Sachs =

British architect & engineer (1870-1919)

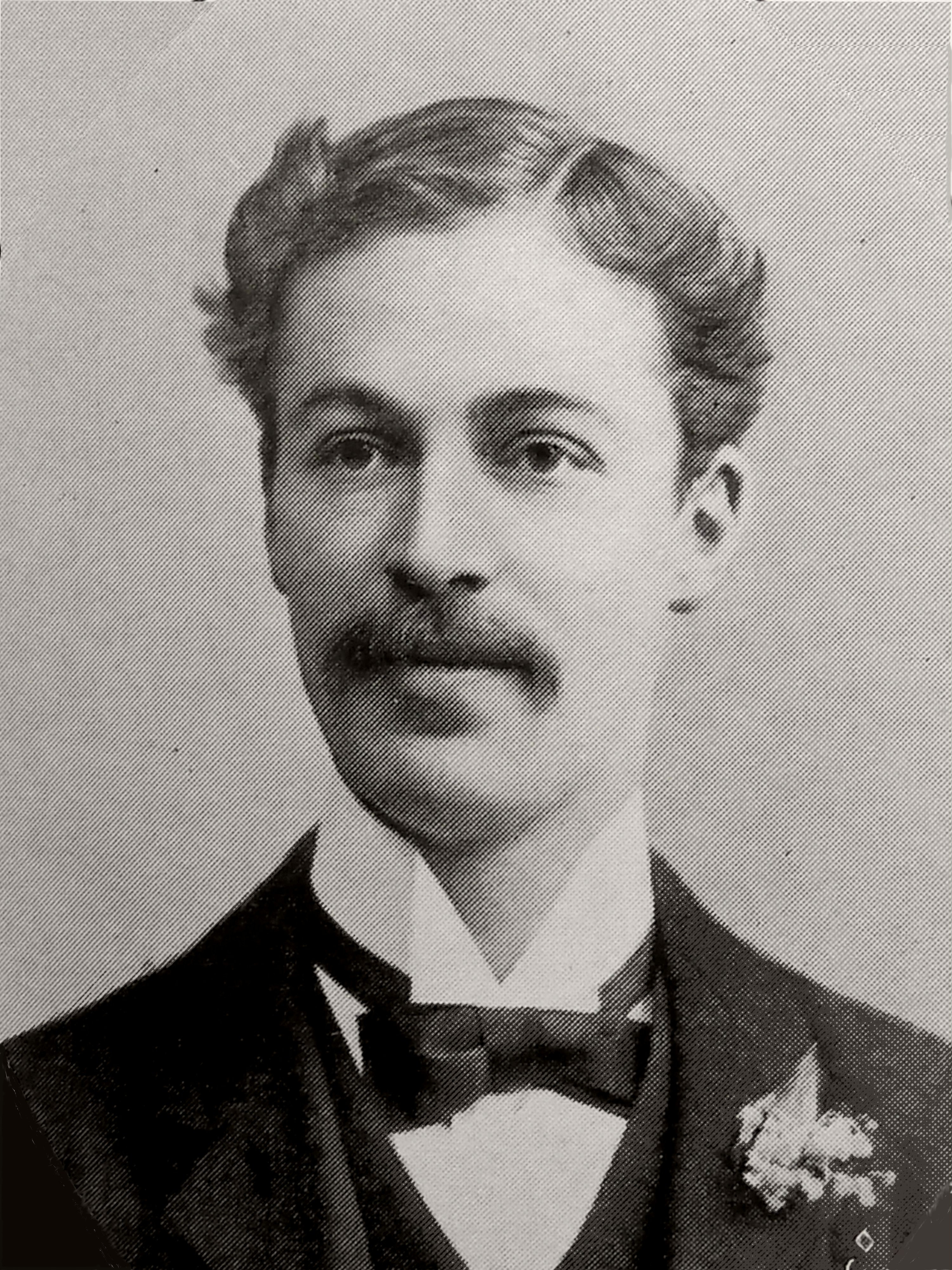
- Born: Edwin Otho Sachs; 5 April 1870; Marylebone, London, United Kingdom of Great Britain and Ireland
- Died: 9 September 1919 (aged 49); Marylebone, London, United Kingdom of Great Britain and Ireland
- Occupations: Architect, engineer, stagehand, fireman, author
- Children: 1: Eric L O Sachs

Edwin Otho Sachs FRSE FRGS (5 April 1870 – 9 September 1919) (English: Edwin Otto Sachs) was a British architect and engineer of German descent, who, by his interest in theatre and working as a stagehand and fireman, specialized in the prevention of theatre fires. Furthermore, he was the technical advisor to the London Royal Opera House from 1898 until his death in 1919. Today he is probably most known as co-author of the three-volume book set Modern Opera Houses and Theatres.

== Life ==
He was born in London the son of G. Sachs, a German. He studied mechanical engineering at University College, London. He then went to Germany to study architecture, qualifying in 1892. During his time in Berlin he worked with the Berlin Royal Fire Brigade and developed a life-long interest in fire prevention. He did further work with both the Vienna fire service and Paris fire service.

On his return to Britain he served as vice president of the National Fire Brigades Union and founded the British Fire Prevention Committee.

In 1898 he installed electric lifts in the Theatre Royal, Drury Lane.

In 1900 and 1901 he famously oversaw the reconstruction of the Royal Opera House in London.

In 1904 he was elected a fellow of the Royal Society of Edinburgh. His proposers were Thomas Ernest Gatehouse, Boverton Redwood, Sir William Thomson, Lord Kelvin and Andrew Gray.

He died in London on 9 September 1919.

== Publications ==
Edwin Sachs (co-)authored the following works:

- Modern Opera Houses and Theatres, published by B.T. Batsford, London UK, reissued by Benjamin Blom, New York in 1968.
  - Volume I (1896), co-author: Ernest A. E. Woodrow.
  - Volume II (1897).
  - Volume III (1898).
  - Supplement: Stage Construction: Examples of Modern Stages Selected from Playhouses Recently Erected in Europe With Descriptive and Critical Text (1898).
- Fires and Public Entertainments: A Study of Some 1100 Notable Fires at Theatres, Music Halls, Circus Buildings and Temporary Structures During the Last 100 Years, published by Charles and Edwin Layton, London UK (1897).

Contributions to publications of the British Fire Prevention Committee:

- The Paris Charity Bazaar Fire, published by the British Fire Prevention Committee, London UK (1898).
- Facts On Fire Prevention; the Results of Fire Tests Conducted by the British Fire Prevention Committee, published by B.T. Batsford, London UK (1902).
- A Record of the International Fire Exhibition, Earl's Court, London, 1903, Organised Under the Auspices of the British Fire Prevention Committee ... : Together With a Report On Some of the Exhibition Events, published for London Exhibitions Ltd. by the British Fire Prevention Committee, London UK (1903?).
- The Brussels Exhibition Fire: With Some Suggestions As to Safeguards at Future Temporary Exhibitions Set Out in the Form of Model Regulations, published by the British Fire Prevention Committee, London UK (1911).

Sachs also contributed to the 1911 edition of the Encyclopædia Britannica, notably the section "Modern Stage Mechanism" in the article "Theatre". In this section, much information from his works Modern Opera Houses and Theatres was used. The section is signed with his initials (E. O. S.).
