= Dune London =

British footwear retailer

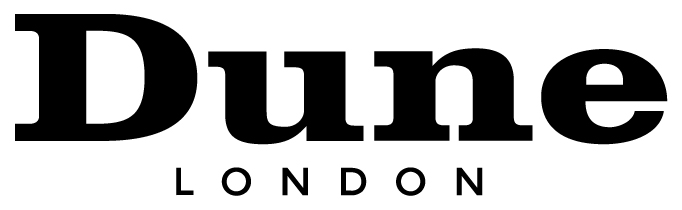
- Industry: Footwear and Accessories retailer
- Founded: 1992; 33 years ago
- Founder: Daniel Rubin
- Headquarters: 11 Evesham Street, London W11, UK
- Products: Shoes, bags, accessories
- Revenue: 184,200,000 pound sterling (2018)
- Net income: 5,300,000 pound sterling (2018)
- Website: www.dunelondon.com

Dune London is a British shoe manufacturer and retailer. Its product line include shoes for women, men, and children as well as fashion accessories.

Dune was founded by Daniel Rubin in 1992. His grandfather was a shoemaker who migrated to the UK from Russia in 1895. Together with his three sons, they started a workshop in London's Whitechapel. It was established as a small concession store situated at London's Oxford Street.

As of 2022, Dune has "over 350 store locations worldwide". The company claims that a pair of shoes undergoes more than 120 processes.
