= Just Show Me How to Love You =

"Tu Cosa Fai Stasera" is a song by Dario Baldan Bembo, Amerigo Cassella which came third in the 1981 the competition at the Sanremo Music Festival and later made famous by Sarah Brightman, under the title Just Show Me How to Love You, when translated into English.

== Sarah Brightman version ==
"Just Show Me How To Love You"

Single by Sarah Brightman

from the album Time to Say Goodbye
- Released: 1997
- Studio: Abbey Road Studios (London, England); Nemo Studios (London, England); Nemo Studios (Hamburg, Germany)
- Genre: Classical Crossover
- Songwriter(s): Dario Baldan Bembo, Amerigo Cassella. English translation/words by Frank Peterson and Laisa
- Producer(s): Frank Peterson

Sarah Brightman singles chronology
"Time to Say Goodbye" (1996)	"Just Show Me How To Love You" (1997)	"Who Wants To Live Forever" (1997)

"Just Show Me How to Love You" is a single by Soprano Sarah Brightman and José Cura, from her album Time to Say Goodbye released in 1997. Written by Dario Baldan Bembo and Amerigo Cassella. English translation/words is by Frank Peterson and Laisa. A music video was released to promote the single.

Brightman's version of "Regnava nel silenzio" from Lucia di Lammermoor by Gaetano Donizetti is only available on this single.

=== Track listing ===
1. "Just Show Me How To Love You"
2. "O Mio Babinno Caro"
3. "Regnava nel silenzio"
