= André Eglevsky =

Russian-born ballet dancer and teacher (1917–1977)

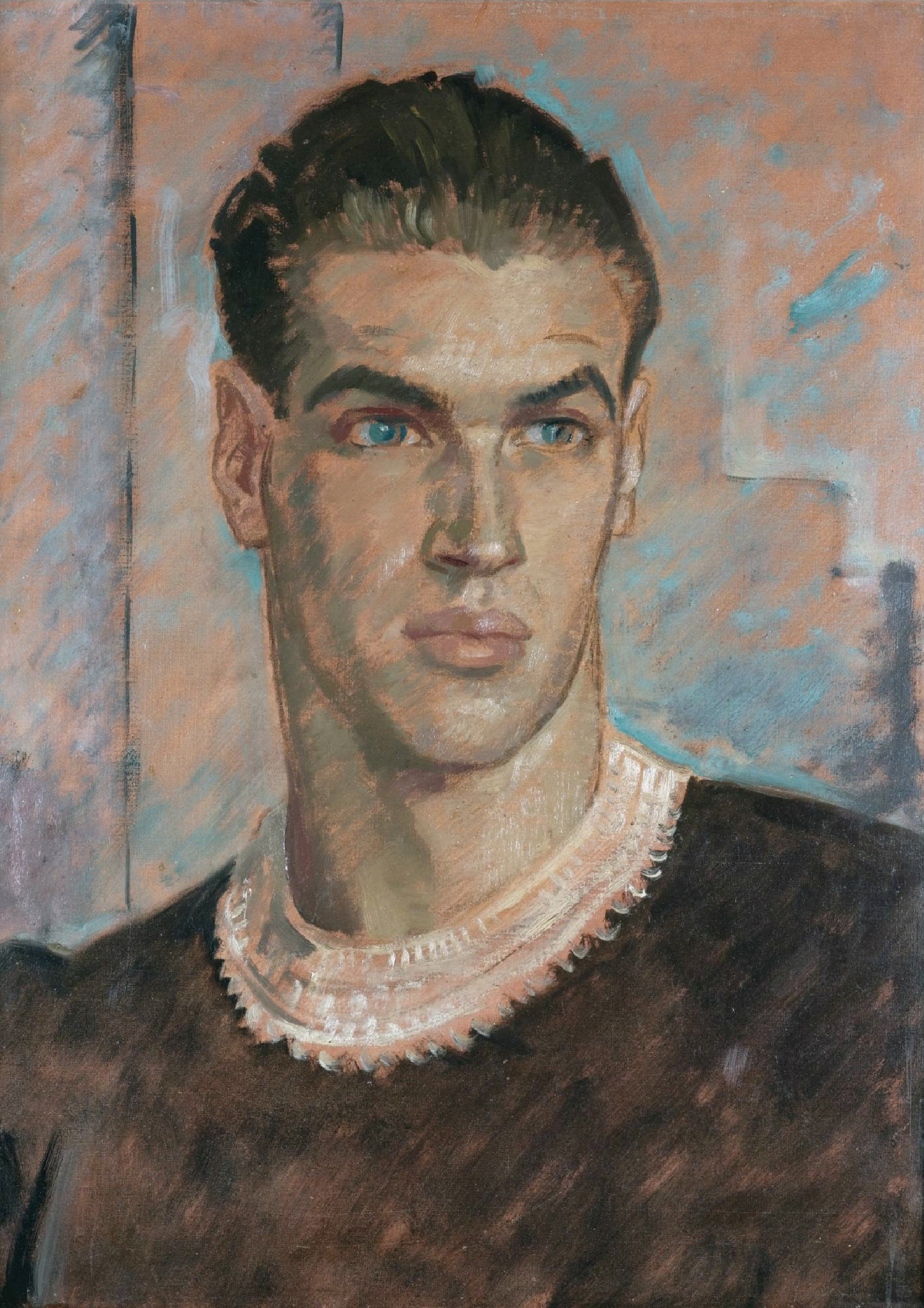
- Portrait by Glyn Philpot, 1937
- Born: December 21, 1917; Moscow, Russia
- Died: December 4, 1977 (aged 59); Elmira, New York, U.S.
- Citizenship: United States
- Occupations: Ballet dancer; ballet teacher
- Years active: 1932–1958 (dancer); 1958–1977 (teacher)
- Spouse: Leda Anchutina
- Children: Marina Eglevsky
- Career
- Former groups: Original Ballet Russe; Ballet Russe de Monte Carlo; American Ballet Theatre; Grand Ballet du Marquis de Cuevas; New York City Ballet

André Eglevsky (Russian: Андрей Эглевский, romanized: Andrey Eglevsky; 21 December 1917 – 4 December 1977) was a Russian-born ballet dancer and teacher who studied in France and, from 1932, danced with Colonel W. de Basil's Ballet Russe de Monte Carlo for several years, as well as other companies in Europe and New York City. He became an American citizen in the late 1930s and danced with the American Ballet Theatre and New York City Ballet. After retiring from performance in 1958, he set up his own ballet school and the Eglevsky Ballet Company in New York.

== Early life and education ==
Eglevsky was born in Moscow. After the Revolution, he and his mother emigrated to France when he was eight, his mother having decided that his talent as a dancer demanded that he be properly trained. Many classically trained dancers and teachers had emigrated to France and London in this period. Eglevsky studied ballet in Nice with Maria Nevelskaya (also known as Maria Nevelska formerly of the Bolshoi Ballet), Lubov Egorova, Mathilde Kschessinska, Alexandre Volinine, Olga Preobrajenska, and Leon Woizikowski in Paris, and Nicholas Legat in London.

== Career ==
At the age of fourteen, Eglevsky joined Colonel W. de Basil's Ballet Russe de Monte Carlo, and after six months was dancing leading roles in such ballets as Swan Lake, Les Sylphides, and Les Présages. In 1935 he joined Igor Youskevitch as the company's Premier Danseur, and a year later joined René Blum's Ballet Russe de Monte Carlo.

Eglevsky travelled to the United States in 1937, and was premier danseur in George Balanchine's American Ballet (later New York City Ballet) until 1938. He also danced at the Radio City Music Hall and in the Broadway musical Great Lady.

In the late 1930s, Eglevsky married the ballerina Leda Anchutina. Their daughter Marina Eglevsky is also a ballerina, while their son André Eglevsky, Jr. became an orthopedic surgeon who currently resides in Fredericksburg, Virginia.

After becoming a United States citizen, in 1939 Eglevsky rejoined the Ballet Russe de Monte Carlo, touring with them until 1942. For the following four years he danced with the Ballet Theatre (now the American Ballet Theatre) in New York City. He also danced as a guest star with Léonide Massine's Ballet Russe Highlights in 1944 and 1945.

In 1946, Eglevsky rejoined Col. de Basil, now director of the Original Ballet Russe, and a year later became premier danseur of the Grand Ballet du Marquis de Cuevas. From 1951 to 1958 he was a principal with the New York City Ballet. In 1952, he appeared in Charlie Chaplin's film Limelight.

He trained as his protégé the dancer Alan Bergman. After having a short career on stage, Bergman developed the Dans-EZ dancewear range.

Upon his retirement in 1958, Eglevsky and his wife started a ballet school in Massapequa, New York. They also founded the Eglevsky Ballet Company. Both continue under the artistic direction of Peter LeBreton Merz. Eglevsky died in 1977 in Elmira, New York, of a heart attack at the age of fifty-nine.

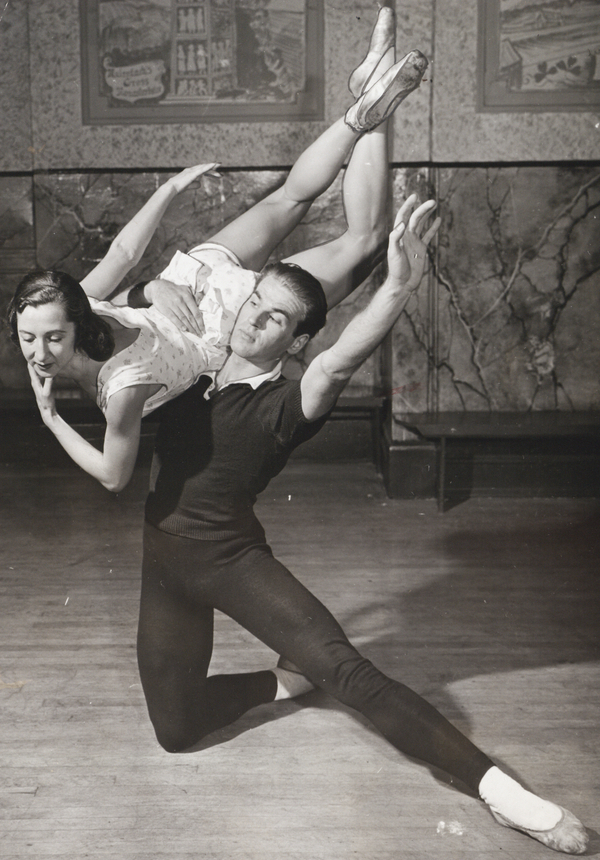
Andre Eglevsky, 1917-1977

== Filmography ==
Year	Title	Role	Notes
1941	The Gay Parisian	Tortoni - The Dancing Master	Short
1942	Spanish Fiesta	Dancer	Short
1952	Limelight	Dancer	(final film role)
