= José Cura =

Argentine-Spanish operatic tenor (born 1962)

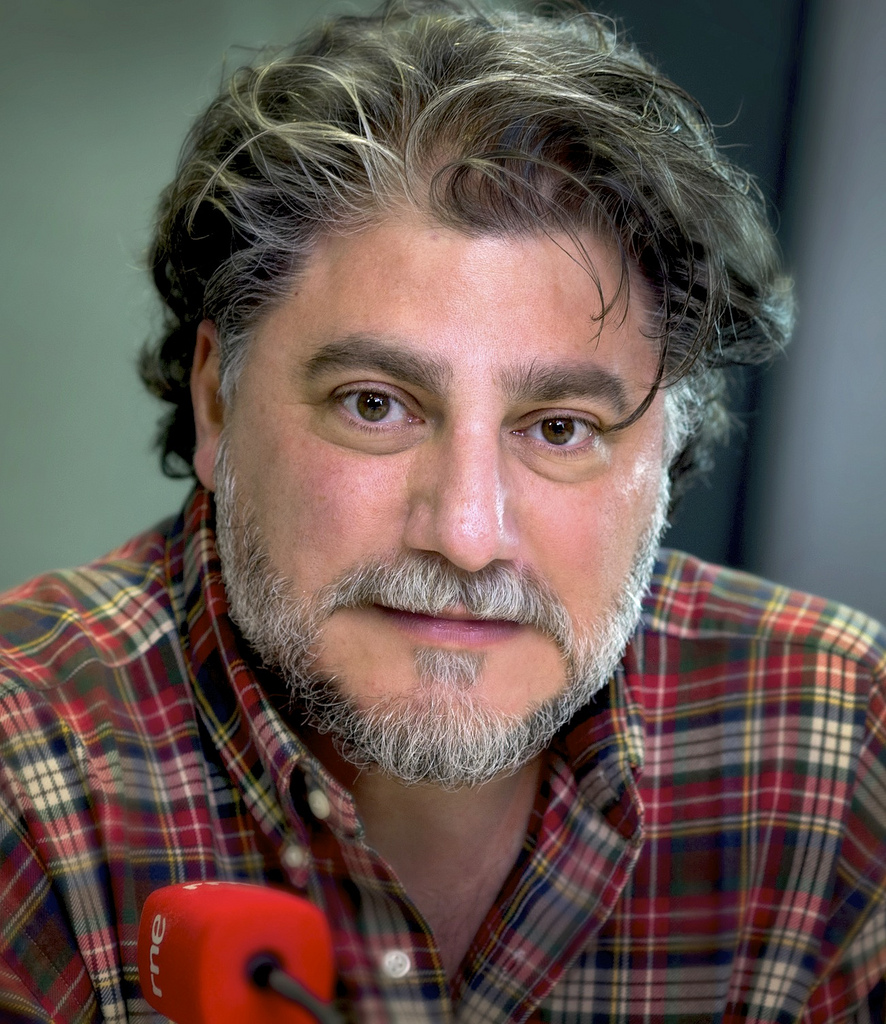
- José Cura in 2013
- Born: José Luis Victor Cura Gómez; 5 December 1962 (age 63); Rosario, Argentina
- Education: Escuela Superior de Música at the Universidad Nacional de Rosario; Instituto Superior de Arte at the Teatro Colón
- Occupations: Singer, conductor, director, scenographer, photographer
- Years active: 1992–present
- Spouse: Silvia Ibarra (m. 1985)
- Children: 3, including Ben

José Luis Victor Cura Gómez (born 5 December 1962) is an Argentine operatic tenor, conductor, director, scenographer and photographer known for intense and original interpretations of opera characters, notably Otello in Verdi’s Otello, Samson in Saint-Saëns’ Samson et Dalila, Canio in Ruggero Leoncavallo's Pagliacci, and Stiffelio in Giuseppe Verdi's Stiffelio.

2007 saw the premiere of La Commedia è finita. The show, designed and directed by Cura – in which he also sang the lead role of Canio – marked the beginning of his career as a director and scenographer. He followed this with his productions of Samson et Dalila at the Badisches Staatstheater in 2010 (in which he also sang the title role) as well as La Rondine at the Opéra national de Lorraine (in which he also conducted) and Cavalleria Rusticana and Pagliacci at the Opéra Royal de Wallonie, both in 2012 – singing the roles of Turiddu and Canio.

== Early life ==
José Cura was born in Rosario, Argentina. At the age of 12 he was playing guitar under Juan di Lorenzo's guidance; at 15 he made his debut as a choral director; and at 16 he began studies in composition with Carlos Castro and piano with Zulma Cabrera.

In 1982, he entered the Music School at the Universidad Nacional de Rosario to continue his musical education; the following year he became assistant conductor of the university choir. At 21, he won a grant to study at the Teatro Colón in Buenos Aires, where he remained for six months.

Cura continued to sing in the opera chorus while focusing on composition and conducting until 1988, when he began working with Horacio Amauri to develop his singing technique.

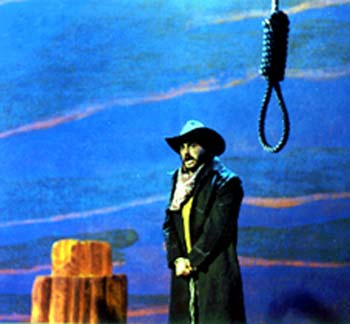
José Cura during 1994's Operalia competition

Determined to make a career in opera, José Cura moved to Italy in 1991 and began voice training with Vittorio Terranova. In February 1992 he made his debut in Verona as the father in Henze's Pollicino. In Genoa he played Le Remendado in Bizet's Carmen and the Capitano de ballestrieri in Verdi's Simon Boccanegra.

== Career as opera singer ==
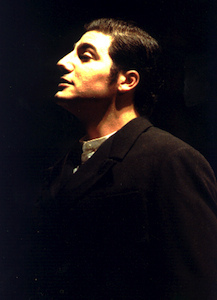
José Cura as Jan in Signorina Julia, 1993

Cura's first starring role came in 1993 in Signorina Julia by Bibalo at the Teatro Lirico Giuseppe Verdi in Trieste, Italy.

He began 1994 with a series of highly successful debuts: Ismaele in Verdi's Nabucco in Genoa and Don Alvaro in Verdi's La Forza del Destino in Turin were followed with Ruggero in the world premiere of the third version of Puccini's La Rondine (Turin) and Roberto in the same composer's rarely performed first opera, Le Villi (Martina Franca); the latter performance is particularly noteworthy for providing Cura's first complete opera recording.

In the same year Cura won the first prize of Plácido Domingo's Operalia competition.

In November, he made his US debut in Chicago as Loris Ipanov in Giordano's Fedora, opposite Mirella Freni; he subsequently reprised the role in Trieste in 1995, in London in 1996, in Vienna in 1997 and 1998, and in Tokyo, Zurich and Lecce, Italy, in 1998.

=== 1995–2000 ===
He continued adding roles to his expanding repertoire in 1995. In February, he returned to Italy to star as Paolo il Bello in the Palermo production of Zandonai's Francesca da Rimini. In June Cura debuted in London's Royal Opera House, Covent Garden, in the title role of Stiffelio on the opening night of the Verdi Festival.

In 1996, Cura built upon his burgeoning reputation and solidified his position as one of the most promising tenors of his generation. Following his portrayal of Osaka in Mascagni's allegorical opera Iris at the Rome Opera in January, he returned to London to star in Saint-Saëns' Samson et Dalila, a role for which he has received international acclaim. For his debuts in Los Angeles and San Francisco, Cura added two roles to his repertoire, Pollione in Bellini's Norma and Don José in Carmen.

Other key roles included Le Villi, Leoncavallo's Pagliacci and Giordano's Andrea Chénier at Opernhaus Zurich, Mascagni's Cavalleria Rusticana at the Ravenna Festival (conducted by Riccardo Muti and broadcast on Italian television), and Pagliacci at Amsterdam's Concertgebouw (conducted by Riccardo Chailly and televised live). In December, he starred in the Puccini segment of the BBC "Great Composers" documentary, telecast in December 1997.

Cura's debut at Milan's La Scala came in January 1997, when he starred as Enzo in Ponchielli's La Gioconda. Cura returned to La Scala in June 1998 as Des Grieux in Puccini's Manon Lescaut and again in February 1999 for La Forza del Destino, both conducted by Riccardo Muti.

In 1997, José Cura sang duets with the famous classical crossover soprano Sarah Brightman, singing Just Show Me How to Love You, and There For Me, songs released in her album Time to Say Goodbye.

With a growing international reputation and increased critical interest, José Cura made a pivotal career decision in 1997: at Turin's Teatro Regio, at age 34, Cura debuted in Verdi's Otello, telecast live on Italian television. Under the baton of Claudio Abbado La Nazione ran the headline "José Cura: a new Otello is born!" Opera houses around the world agreed, offering Cura the opportunity to take his Moor to London, Washington, Madrid, Trieste, Munich, Buenos Aires, Nice, Paris, Vienna, Zurich, Warsaw, Tokyo, and Florence – making him one of the most eagerly sought-after Otellos of his generation.

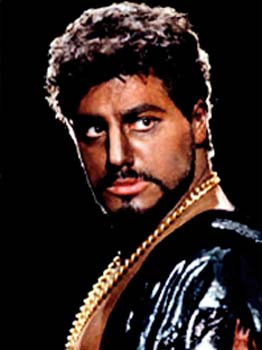
José Cura as Otello at the Teatro Colón in 1999

Following his Otello debut, Cura starred in Cavalleria Rusticana in Bologna, Tosca in Torre del Lago, Fedora in Vienna, and in an acclaimed Samson et Dalila in Turin. He made his first appearance as leading man at the Arena di Verona in summer of 1997 in Carmen. He headlined in a Night of the Stars Gala in London and concluded the year with a series of sensational concerts in Germany.

It was followed in 1998 when he first appeared in Aida at the inaugural season of the New National Theatre Tokyo.

Said to be one of the great modern voices, in 1999 José Cura returned to Paris for Carmen Milan for La Forza del Destino and Verona for Aida (televised – the first opera ever to be broadcast live over the internet). The year ended with his debuts at New York's Metropolitan Opera in Cavalleria Rusticana as only the second tenor in the Met's history to make his debut on opening night (the other having been Caruso in 1903) and at Madrid's Teatro Real in Otello conducted by his long-time friend and mentor, Maestro Luis Antonio García Navarro.

=== 2000–2005 ===
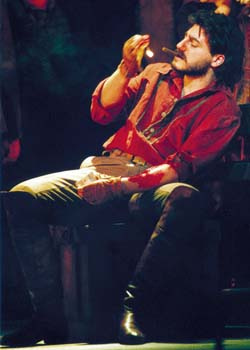
José Cura as Manrico in Il Trovatore at the Teatro Real of Madrid in 2000

In 2000, José Cura sang Otello in Washington and starred as Alfredo in La Traviata a Paris a groundbreaking production staged in authentic Paris settings while being telecast live around the world.

In 2001 José Cura appeared in numerous special performances and opera productions honoring the Centenary of Verdi's death, including Otello at the Wiener Staatsoper on 27 January (the date of Verdi's death), Paris' Theatre du Chatelet, London's Covent Garden, Trieste's Teatro Verdi and the Zurich Opera House. He sang in performances of Aida in Greece and Japan and created a memorable Don Carlo in Zurich. He gave two concerts with soprano Daniela Dessi celebrating Verdi's art at the Barbican Centre in London and shared the concert stage with Renato Bruson in Parma for an evening of Verdi arias and duets.

Cura continued his stellar run of Verdi productions into 2002, when he starred as Manrico in the ROH (ROH) production of Il Trovatore, reprised Otello in Zurich, and brought his Moor to Warsaw for a special, one-time-only performance. He also appeared in Tokyo in Tosca, Vienna in Pagliacci, and London in Samson et Dalila in a concert version at the Barbican Centre under the baton of Sir Colin Davis. Other important concerts in 2002 included four outdoor venues: Dalhalla, Sweden; Lodz, Poland; Herod Atticus, Athens, Greece; and Hyde Park, London, where Cura entertained an audience estimated at 40,000. Other notable venues included the National Concert Hall in Taipei, the Pavilhao Atlantico in Lisbon, and the Kremlin in Moscow.

Operas performed in early 2003 included Otello (Tokyo), Don Carlo (Zurich) and Tosca (Vienna). In June, Cura debuted as Calaf in the Arena di Verona production of Puccini's fantasy opera, Turandot.

Cura began the 2003/2004 with his debut at the Wiener Staatsoper as the prophet Jean in Massenet's rarely performed Hérodiade. In November 2003, Cura returned to the Verdi repertoire to reprise his role of Don Carlo and Alfredo in La Traviata, both in Zurich.

In December and January (2004) he made his return to the US, starring in the Lyric Opera of Chicago's production of Samson et Dalila; in March he reprised the role at the Royal Opera House in London. In Vienna, he introduced an intensely personal Andrea Chénier. In Zurich, Cura triumphed as Dick Johnson in Puccini's La fanciulla del west. In April, Cura conducted Madame Butterfly in Warsaw.

José Cura has been a strong advocate for making classical music accessible to the masses, as demonstrated in his participation in two spectacular events in early 2004. In February, Maestro Cura took up the baton to conduct Verdi's Un ballo in maschera in Piacenza, Italy, in a unique, modern production held in a vast public exhibition hall, designed to open the performance to the widest possible audience. In May, he traveled to Seoul for several performances of Carmen, an extravagant experiment in bringing opera to the people of Asia. Held in an outdoor arena seating 37,000 spectators and performed on a 120-meter long stage outfitted with a video screen the size of a football field. Cura finished the 2003/2004 opera season with Otello in Hamburg and Carmen in Warsaw.

In September 2004, José Cura returned to Zurich for a revival of Otello, followed by the house premiere of Stiffelio in the title role. Cura returned to Lisbon at the end of October to headline an evening of music for the Associacao Portuguesa Contra a Leucemia. He sang a program of American Spirituals, operatic favorites, and Argentine songs, and conducted selections by Orff, Rachmaninov, and Borodin.

On 2 November he hosted the night of ten tenors at the Royal Festival Hall in London. Cura did double-duty as tenor and maestro: he delivered some of opera's most well-known arias, then he stepped onto the podium to display not only his conducting skills but also his innate sensitivity to the needs of his nine young soloists.

=== 2005–2010 ===
Cura opened the calendar year of 2005 with a concert-version of Il Corsaro in Barcelona followed with Samson et Dalila at the Metropolitan Opera in New York City. In spring 2005, Cura focused his considerable talents on portraying Canio in Berlin and Piacenza in two very different productions. In June, Cura returned to Verona as Radames for two performances of Aida in a Franco Zeffirelli production. In July, he traveled to Munich for two performances of Otello. José Cura ended his 2005 opera season with a run of Turandot at the Arena di Verona.

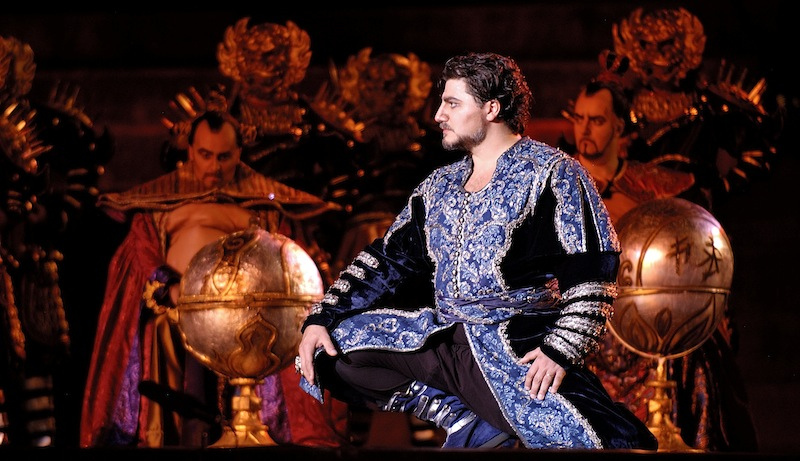
José Cura as Calaf in Turandot at the Arena di Verona in 2005

Cura's first concert of 2005 featured the star soprano Anna Netrebko; both performed before a crowd of 8,000 at the Cologne arena (Lanxess Arena). In July, Cura took part in the opening ceremonies of the World Games in Duisburg, Germany.

Cura started the 2005/2006 season in London starring as Puccini's outlaw hero Dick Johnson in the much-anticipated ROH production of La fanciulla del west (September). Cura then reprised the role of Roberto in Puccini's rarely staged first opera, Le Villi in Vienna (October). In January 2006, Cura returned to the stage in the title role in Andrea Chénier at Teatro Comunale di Bologna. In February, José Cura re-introduced the audience at the Liceu of Barcelona to Verdi's masterpiece, Otello, after an eighteen-year absence.

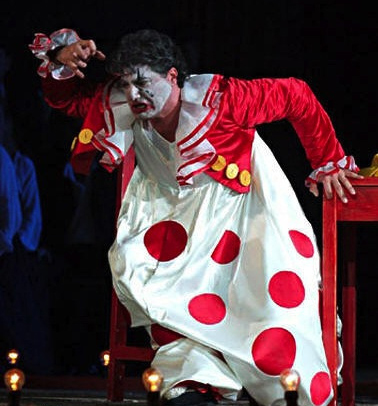
José Cura as Canio in Pagliacci, 2006, Arena di Verona

After reprising his Alfredo in La Traviata and Stiffelio in the much-neglected Verdi opera of the same name, Cura became the first tenor to bring Calaf to life in the Zurich Opera's avant garde production of Puccini's Turandot. Cura reprises the role in Zurich in the 2006/2007 season and will again in 2007/2008. From Zurich, Cura traveled to Vienna to star in Le Villi, and conduct Madame Butterfly at the Vienna State Opera. In June, Cura returned to Japan to reprise the lead role in Andrea Chénier with the Teatro Comunale di Bologna. His performance was greeted with enthusiastic applause led by the Japanese Prime Minister, Junichiro Koizumi, a noted opera lover. Cura's summer took an unexpected turn when he arrived in Verona for the first of several performances as Canio in Pagliacci: the tenor scheduled for the role of Turiddu in the double-header Cavalleria Rusticana was forced to withdraw at the last minute, leaving the Arena di Verona without a world-class tenor to sing the role. Cura responded immediately. Stepping onto the ancient Roman stones in brutal summer heat, still suffering the effects from jet-lag and trying to recall the role he had not sung in over six years, he repaid a debt of honor to the theater that first opened its arms to him in 1992. It was not an offer made lightly Cura became only the third tenor in 84 years of Arena history to undertake this daunting challenge. In mid-July, Cura traveled to Rijeka, Croatia, for a summer night of music making. Following an early September 2006 engagement in Vienna as Roberto in Le Villi, Cura traveled to Berlin to end the month in the Deutsche Oper's revival of La fanciulla del west. In October, Cura made a return to Turin to star as Calaf in an innovative staging of Turandot.

Cura returned to the United States at the end of October for a series of performances at the Metropolitan Opera and two very different concerts. He first starred as Mario Cavaradossi in the lavish Franco Zeffirelli production of Tosca. Then, Cura found time during his brief stay in New York to fly to Miami as special guest of the Orquestra de São Paulo for a night of Latin-accented music. Cura also took part in the Richard Tucker Music Foundation Gala, a prestigious annual event that features outstanding opera singers performing arias and scenes. In a rare treat for fans of Verdi's Don Carlo, Cura reprised his acclaimed portrayal of the tortured, insecure Infant in Zurich at the end of November and then brought an entirely different Don Carlo to Vienna, where he shared the stage with some of today's most distinguished performers.

Cura emerged from a brief holiday for three opera galas and a reprise of his Pagliacci in Berlin. In Zurich, he closed out the year with his Turandot; in Palermo, he presented his heroic Mario Cavaradossi in a controversial Tosca; and in Karlsruhe, he graciously filled in at the last minute for a colleague in a production of the same opera before returning to Berlin to perform his Canio. Following a fund-raising gala in Lisbon for the Associacao Portuguesa contra a Leucemia, Cura offered a one-night-only presentation of his acclaimed Otello in Mannheim before traveling to Shanghai with the Zurich Opera for Turandot and a special Valentine's Day orchestral concert. Cura also took time out to hold an extensive master class for a select group of international singers and a follow-up concert in Devon in his role of Patron to the New Devon Opera. In June, Cura pulled off an exciting tour de force when he returned to Rijeka, Croatia, wearing a coat of many fabrics—director, set designer and playwright in his production of La Commedia è finita.

What had been planned as a summer sabbatical with his family turned into a triumphant professional return to Argentina in June. He began with his participation in the rededication of the Monument to the Flag in his hometown (where he was introduced as one of the 50 extraordinary lights Rosario had sent into the world), then offering a series of semi-staged, rapturously received performances of Samson et Dalila, an unforgettable, intimate concert where he unveiled new compositions based on the poetry of Pablo Neruda, and ended with a master class held for aspiring local singers.

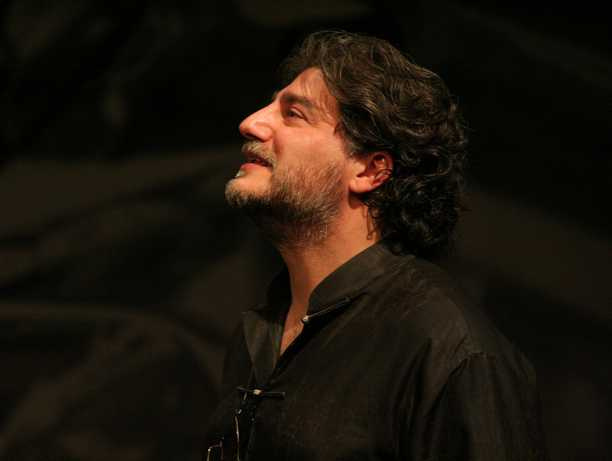
José Cura during a concert performance

José Cura ended the hot summer months in Cortona, Italy, with two concerts at the prestigious Tuscan Sun Festival; Cura led the Russian National Orchestra in an evening full of gems from the Russian orchestral repertoire and followed up with a vocal concert featuring some of the most popular pieces from Leoncavallo, Puccini, Verdi, and Bizet. He followed with a concert performance in Halle, sharing the stage once more with soprano Anna Netrebko in an evening of arias and duets in front of a sold-out audience of over 8,000.

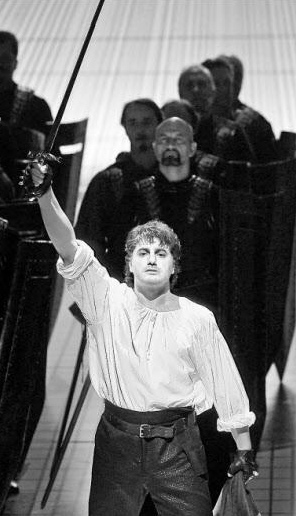
José Cura on stage as Le Cid in 2008, the day his father died

Cura then returned to Barcelona for a month-long run of Andrea Chénier at the Liceu. Following a gala concert in Lisbon once more in support of Associacao Portuguesa Contra a Leucemia, Cura traveled to Cologne to headline in the famous verismo double-bill of Cav/Pag. Between performances in Cologne, Cura presented two concerts in Eindhoven (the second added by popular demand).

In January 2008, José Cura performed the title role in Massenets rarely staged opera Le Cid at the Zurich Opera. On the morning of the premiere, his father, Oscar Cura, died in Argentina. Despite the personal tragedy, Cura proceeded with the performance that evening. The audience responded with a standing ovation accompanied by tears of sympathy. He dedicated the performance to his father and flew to his hometown of Rosario, Argentina, the following day.

In early February, Cura took time out from his run of Le Cid in Zurich to conduct Verdi's Requiem for the Hungarian charity Salva Vita, an organization dedicated to helping handicapped citizens gain increased independence through vocational education. After conducting at the Deutsche Oper in Berlin in March, Cura made his much anticipated return the United States in Pagliacci at the San Diego Opera – the first time he had performed Canio in North America. Returning to Europe, Cura sang Otello at the Staatsoper in Hannover for a single gala performance. He followed that performance with a gala concert in Düsseldorf and offered his Cavaradossi in Tosca in Karlsruhe. The month of June found that Cura was firmly entrenched in Italian theater, returning to Bologna for one of his signature roles, Samson, and then on to Turin for Puccini's rarely performed Edgar in an early celebration of the 150th anniversary of Puccini's birth.

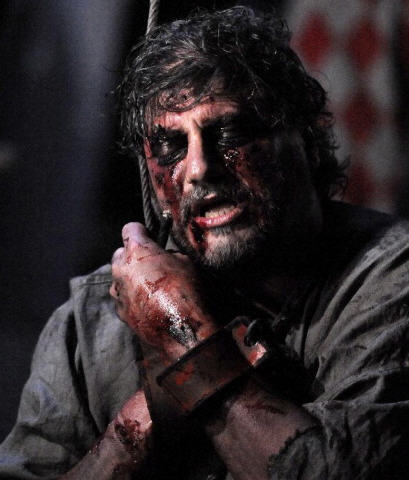
José Cura as Samson in Karlsruhe in 2010

Cura rounded up the summer months with a brief return to Zurich for two performances of Turandot and performed in concert at the Festival of Toledo and at the Tuscan Sun Festival in Cortona – where he also presented an exhibition of his photography in advance of the release of his first collection, Espontáneas: Photography by José Cura. Cura finished the summer season with Samson et Dalila in Santander, Spain.

The start of the 2008/2009 season saw Cura engaged in a labor of love: presenting a master class for the New Devon Opera, a charity for which he is Patron. In mid-September, he returned to the Royal Opera House to reprise Dick Johnson in La Fanciulla del West. Cura followed his run of Fanciulla performances with two notable concerts, one in Zagreb and the second in Nancy. The latter performance came a year after his celebrated master class for Nancy Opera Passion and in advance of his 2010 masterclass in the same city.

The Auditorio de Tenerife hosted Cura in November when he brought his Otello to the Atlantic Island for the fall festival. He then closed the month of November in Mannheim starring in the verismo twins. Cura sang his first Calaf in Verona in 2003; nearly six years later, he brought his dangerous and controversial prince to Covent Garden.

Cura continued the 2008/2009 season with symphonic concerts in Bologna, and Budapest, Stiffelio, Carmen, and Tosca in Vienna, Cavalleria Rusticana and Pagliacci at the Met in New York, and Turandot, Cavalleria rusticana and Pagliacci in Zurich.

=== 2010–present ===
Cura continues to tour concert halls and opera houses around the world, performing his signature roles of Otello, Samson, Canio, Turiddu, Don José, Stiffelio, Cavaradossi, Dick Johnson, Calaf, Edgar etc. – debuting in La Bohème as Rodolfo at the Zurich Opera House in 2010.

He took his Otello to the Met in 2013, not before saving the last performance of Carmen at the same opera house, a favour which he had been asked to do the very moment he landed in New York, jet-lagged, from Europe. Without rehearsals and very little sleep, Cura performed the role of Don José.

His performance of Otello at the Salzburg Easter festival in 2016 was in the opinion Giacomo Parini of the Milano Gazzetto to be "one of the most vulgar performances of Otello in memory. Verdi and all proponents of beautiful singing are rolling in their graves."

In 2025, Cura's links to theaters and productions in Russia came under scrutiny, as a result of which the Estonian National Opera terminated cooperation with him, thereby postponing a performance of Benjamin Britten's opera Peter Grimes. The opera's general manager, Ott Maaten, stated that the issue had been discussed with Cura, in response to which Cura had not condemned the Russian aggression against Ukraine.

=== Career as conductor ===
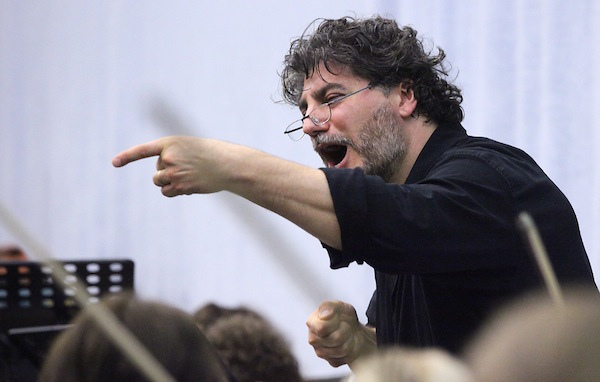
José Cura conducting Bach's Mass in B minor in 2009

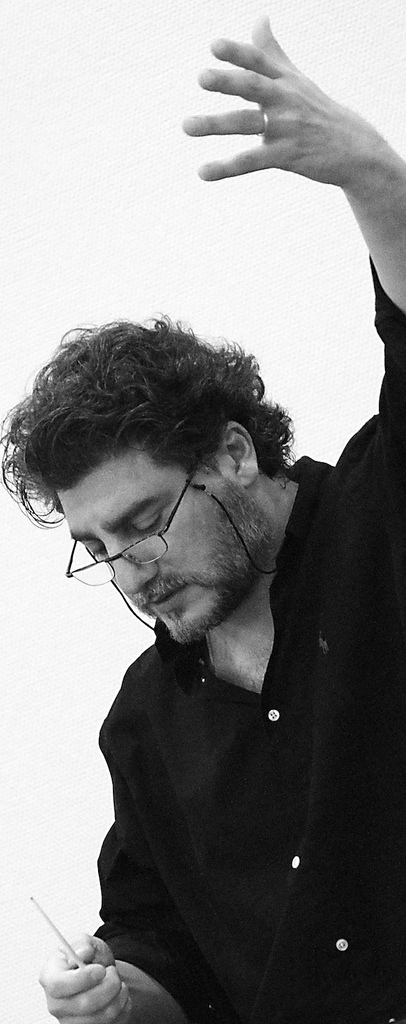
José Cura conducting Bach's Mass in B Minor in 2009

Originally trained as an orchestral conductor, his vocal talents were unrecognised until 1988.

He became the first artist to sing and conduct simultaneously (both in concert and on recordings) and the first to combine singing with symphonic works in a ‘half and half’ concert format.

Cura made operatic history when he first conducted Cavalleria Rusticana and then stepped on stage after intermission to sing Canio in Pagliacci at the Hamburg State Opera in February 2003.

He accepted a three-year assignment as principal guest conductor of Sinfonia Varsovia, a position previously held by the late Lord Yehudi Menuhin, in early 2001. Cura inaugurated his partnership with a concert in Warsaw in November.

Cura subsequently led his orchestra in a series of highly acclaimed performances of such symphonic works as Respighi's Pines of Rome, Rachmaninov's Second Symphony and Beethoven's Choral Symphony No. 9. His recordings of Rachmaninov's Symphony No. 2 and Aurora, a collection of opera arias, feature Cura conducting the Polish ensemble. A favorite guest conductor of orchestras across Europe, he conducted a New Year's concert in Budapest to bring the year to a close.

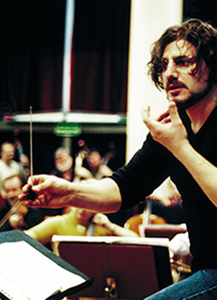
José Cura conducting the Sinfonia Varsovia in 2002

As a concert performer, José Cura has successfully integrated the roles of singer and conductor as demonstrated in his performance in the Vienna Konzerthaus in November 2002, seamlessly moving from singing arias from his new album, Aurora, to conducting the Rachmaninov Symphony No. 2.

On 18 September he conducted Sinfonia Varsovia in Beethoven's monumental 5th Symphony as part of the VI European Festival in Jelenia Góra. Cura next traveled to Sofia to conduct the Bulgaria Philharmonic Orchestra on 28 September in an evening of music that included Respighi's Pini di Roma, Borodin's Polovtsian Dances and Tchaikovsky's 5th Symphony.

In October 2003, he returned to Prague for a standing-room-only concert featuring an inspired selection of Puccini arias coupled with the 9th Symphony from the Czech Republic's most famous composer, Antonín Dvořák. Cura's final public concert of the year was in Budapest, during which the maestro led the Matàv Hungarian Symphony Orchestra in a rendition of Dvořák's 9th-recorded live and released by Cura's Cuibar label.

In April 2004, Cura conducted Madama Butterfly in Warsaw.

Maestro Cura also proved his versatility on the podium throughout the year 2006. In June, Cura returned to his roots to conduct two sacred works at the Miskolci Opera Fesztival in Hungary. The program, which opened with the somber beauty of Rossini's Stabat Mater, was highlighted by the conductor's interpretation of Zoltán Kodály's Te Deum. In September, Cura traveled to Plymouth, England, to conduct the Ten Tors orchestra in a Gala Opera Concert. The Maestro led his ensemble in numbers from Rossini (William Tell Overture), Tchaikovsky (Eugene Onegin), Gershwin (selections from Porgy and Bess), Verdi (I vespri Siciliani overture), and Dvořák (Hymn to the Moon from Rusalka and the final movement from Symphony No. 9).

Cura traveled to Italy in December for a month-long immersion in conducting, interrupted only when he raised his voice in support of charity during the annual Muscular Dystrophy Telethon. Concerts with the L'orchestra della Fondazione Arturo Toscanini in Busseto and Piacenza featured Rachmaninov's Piano Concerto No. 2 in C minor and Symphony No. 2 in E minor and Kodály's Dances of Galanta. The Maestro ended the month in Mantova conducting Verdi's I vespri Siciliani.

=== Directing and scenography ===
José Cura directed and designed the sets of La Commedia è finita in 2007.

In May 2008, he produced Un ballo in maschera for the Köln Staatstheater.

He later followed suit in his production of Samson et Dalila at the Badisches Staatstheater in 2010 (in which he also designed the costumes) as well as La Rondine at the Opéra national de Lorraine and Cavalleria Rusticana and Pagliacci at the Opéra Royal de Wallonie, both in 2012.

In 2012, he was the first artist to have designed the scenography and costumes as well as directing and conducting an opera. This was La Rondine, at the Opéra de Lorraine, in Nancy, France.

=== Photography ===
In 2008, he published his first photography book Espontáneas (ISBN 3-85881-193-9) followed by an exhibition at the Tuscan Sun Festival in Cortona, Italy.

== Principal recordings ==
Cura's discography and filmography includes opera, concert performances and conducting.

In 2002 he created Cuibar Phono Video (CPV). The same year, CPV released Rachmaninoff’s Symphony No. 2 by Sinfonia Varsovia with Cura conducting. Since then, his recordings have been on CPV.

=== Discography ===
Year	Recording	Company
1994	Le Villi	Nuova era
1996	Iris	BMG – Ricordi
1997	Anhelo	Erato
1997	Puccini Arias	Erato
1998	Fedora	ECA
1998	Samson et Dalila	Erato
1999	Verismo	Erato
2000	Pagliacci	Decca
2000	Verismo	Erato
2000	La Traviata à Paris	Teldec
2000	Manon Lescaut	Deutsche Grammophon
2001	Bravo Cura Tour Collection	Erato
2002	Artist Portrait	Warner Classics
2002	Boleros	Warner Classics
2002	Aurora	CPV
2002	Rachmaninov Symphony N.2 in E minor	CPV
2003	Dvořák Love Songs / Symphony N.9	CPV

=== Filmography ===
Year	Recording	Company
1999	Great Composers	BBC
1999	In Passione Domini	RAI
2000	Puccini: Il Trittico	BMG – Ricordi
2001	A Passion for Verdi	RM Associates
2001	Tosca	Kultur
2001	Verdi Gala	Euro Arts
2002	Il Trovatore	BBC – Opus Arte
2004	Verdi Gala	Dynamic
2005	Manon Lescaut	TDK
2006	Andrea Chénier	Rai Trade
2007	La Traviata à Paris	Rai Cinema
2007	Otello	Opus Arte
2008	José Cura in Concert Budapest 2000	Cuibar – Bravissimo
2009	Edgar	Arthaus – RAI Trade
2010	Cavalleria/Pagliacci	SWR – Arte
2012	Samson et Dalila	Cuibar – Arthaus

== Prizes and awards ==
Year	Prize/Award	Authority
1994	1st Prize	Plácido Domingo's Operalia International Opera Competition
1996	Abbiati Award	Premio Franco Abbiati della Critica Musicale Italiana, Italy
1998	Orphée D'Or	Académie du Disque Lyrique, France
1999	Professor Honoris Causae	Universidad C.A.E.C.E, Argentina
1999	Citizen of Honour	City of Rosario, Argentina
1999	ECHO Singer of the Year	Deutsche Phono-Akademie, Germany
2000	Chevalier de l'Ordre du Cèdre	Lebanese Government
2001	Artist of the Year	Grup de Liceistes – Barcelona, Spain
2002	The Ewa Czeszejko	Sochacki Foundation Award, Poland
2003	Artist of the Year	Catullus Prize, Italy
2004	Citizen of Honour	City of Veszprem, Hungary
2005	Citizen of Honour	City of Piacenza, Italy
2005	Città di Baveno	Festival Umberto Giordano, Italy
2006	Giovanni Zanatello Artist of the 2005 Season	Arena di Verona, Italy
2006	Enric Granados Award	Enric Granados, Spain
2006	Insigna d'or	Amics de l'Opera de Lerida, Spain
2007	Career Achievement Award	Lebanese Society of Rosario, Argentina
2008	Best Argentinean Opera Singer of 2007	Fundación Teatro Colón, Argentina
2009	Best Argentinean Male Singers of the Decade (1999–2008)	Fundación Konex, Argentina
2009	Career Medal	Fondazione Ugo Becattini, Italy
2010	Österreichischer Kammersänger	Wiener Staatsoper, Austria
2011	Theater prize, for "Deleting borders between East and West"	National Theatre, Slovakia
2015	Mención de Honor "Senador Domingo Faustino Sarmiento" por su obra destinada a mejorar la calidad de vida de sus semejantes, de las instituciones y de sus comunidades	Senado, Argentina
2015	Presidente Onorario	Academia Musicale di Verona, Italy
2016	Máximo galardón de la Federació Catalana de Basquetbol	Barcelona, Spain
2016	Reconocimiento del Ministerio de Educación de la Ciudad Autónoma de Buenos Aires	Buenos Aires, Argentina
2017	Professor Honoris Causa de la Universidad Nacional de Rosario.	Rosario, Argentina

== Teaching and patronage ==
He is the Patron of the New Devon Opera and the Vice-President of the British Youth Opera (or BYO).

In 2007 José Cura was appointed visiting professor of the Royal Academy of Music in London.

He has given many masterclasses and taught at different institutions throughout the years. Most notably, for Nancy Opéra Passion, which focuses on launching new young talents onto the international stage.

== Charity work ==
Cura hosted the annual Muscular Dystrophy Telethon in Italy in 2005.

In August 2007, he was awarded the Socio Fundador Honorario by the Associacao Portuguesa contra a Leucemia (APCL) for his on-going support of the association in its efforts to find a cure for Leukemia.

Since 2008, he has been collaborating the Salva Vita Foundation in Hungary.
