= Oliver Froning =

German musician

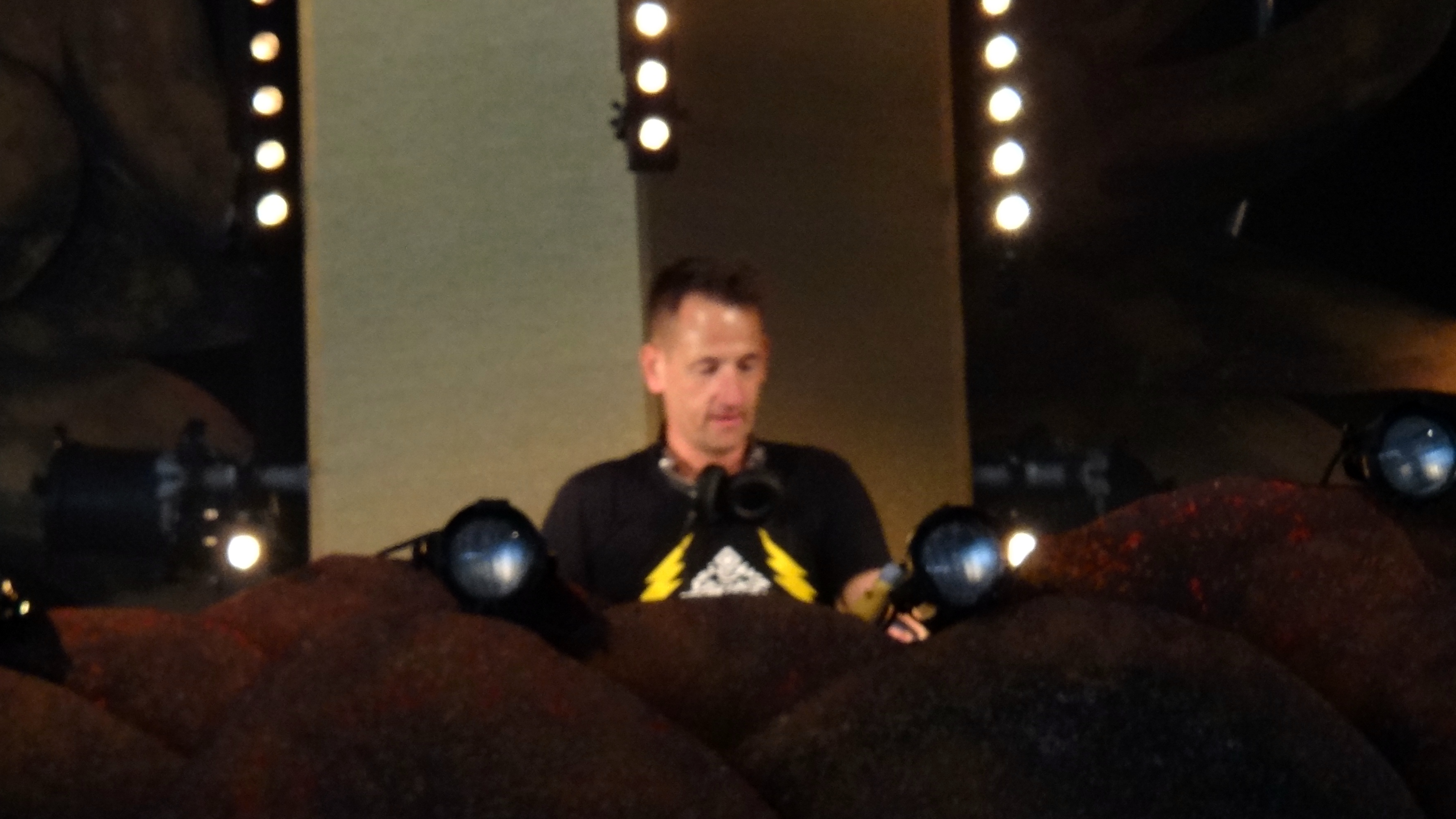
Oliver Froning playing at Defqon.1 2015.

Oliver Froning (born 25 July 1963 in Münster, West Germany) is a German musician. He began his music career in 1981 under the name djraw. Together with Jens Oettrich, he started the group Dune in 1992. The group performed from 1992 to 2000. Since 2003, Oliver Froning has been concentrating on his project Dune in which he performs solo as a disc jockey. In 2016, Oliver Froning released a single "Magic Carpet Ride" on his record label Raw Productions.
