= Queen discography =

Recordings by British rock band

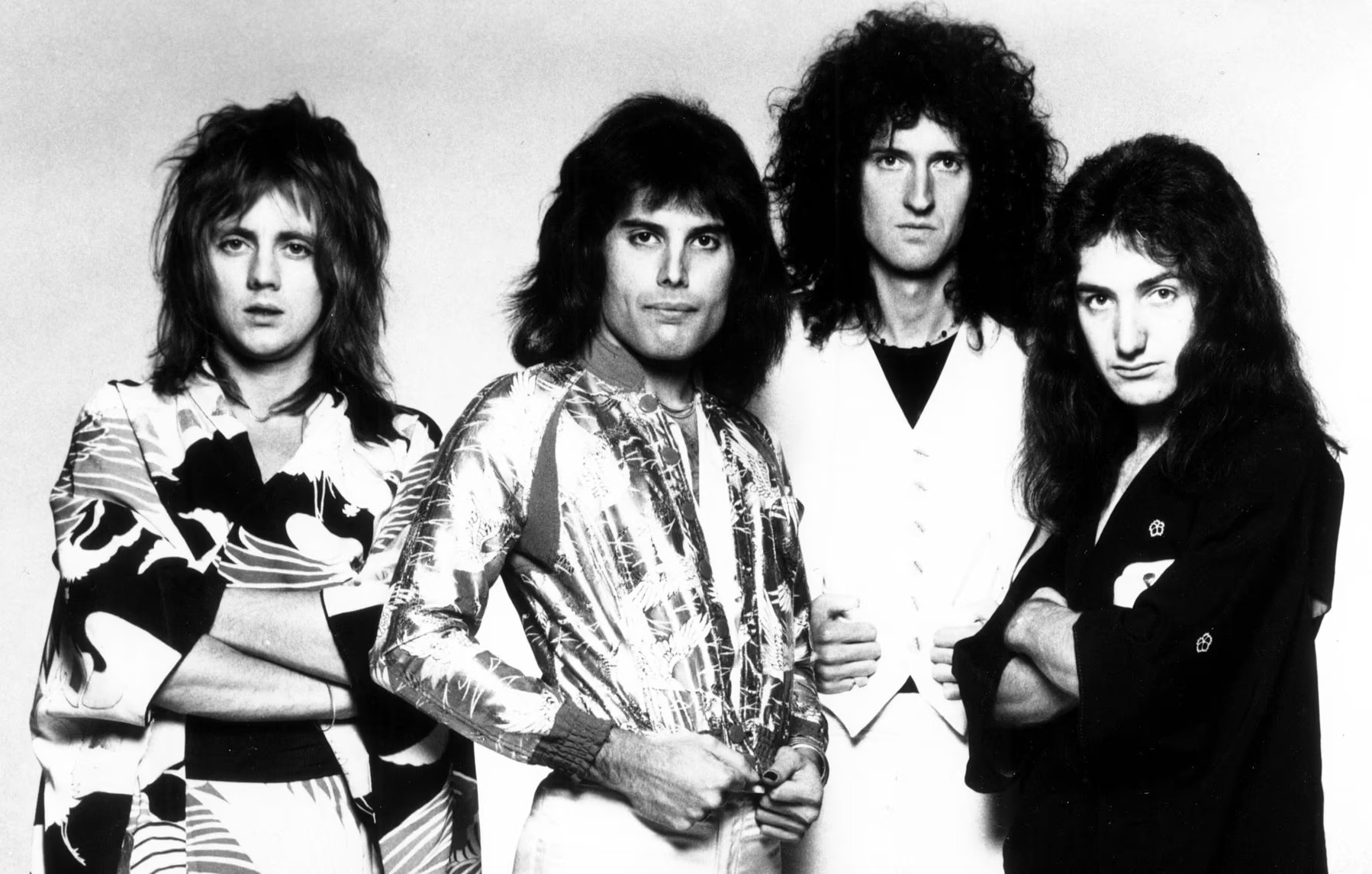
- Queen in 1975
- Studio albums: 15
- Extended plays: 2
- Soundtrack albums: 2
- Live albums: 10
- Compilation albums: 17
- Singles: 74
- Box sets: 11
- Other releases: 1

British rock band Queen have released 15 studio albums, 10 live albums, 16 compilation albums, 2 soundtrack albums, 2 extended plays, 73 singles, and 7 promotional singles. Queen were formed in London by Freddie Mercury (vocals and keyboards), Brian May (guitar), and Roger Taylor (drums), and in 1971, John Deacon (bassist) became a member.

Since the 1970s, Queen have sold 300 million records worldwide, making them one of the best-selling artists in history. Billboard ranked them as the 87th Greatest Artist of All Time. According to RIAA, Queen have sold 108.7 million certified records in the US.

Founded in 1970, Queen released their self-titled debut album in 1973. Despite not being an immediate success, they quickly gained popularity in Britain with their second album Queen II in 1974. Their 1975 single, "Bohemian Rhapsody", was No. 1 in the UK charts for nine weeks (and a further five weeks in 1991 after Mercury's death) and is the third-biggest-selling single of all time in the UK. In the US, "Bohemian Rhapsody" hit the Billboard Top 40 charts in three different decades, reaching No. 9 on its original release in 1975, No. 2 in 1992 after being featured in the film Wayne's World, and hitting the Top 40 once more in 2018 upon the release of the Queen biopic Bohemian Rhapsody. The 1981 compilation Greatest Hits is the biggest-selling album in UK history, with 6 million copies sold by 2014. The 1991 compilation Greatest Hits II is also one of the UK's top ten biggest-sellers of all time, with 3.8 million copies sold by 2012.

In 1972, Queen signed a production deal with Trident Studios. Later in their career, Queen signed a record contract with EMI, and Elektra in the United States. The band would remain with EMI for the rest of their career, although in 1983 they terminated their American contract with Elektra and signed with Capitol Records. However, in 1990, they terminated their US contract with Capitol and signed with Disney's Hollywood Records, which has remained the current recorded-music rights owner and distributor of Queen's entire music catalogue in the US and Canada.

In 1991, Hollywood Records paid tribute to Queen's 20th anniversary and remastered their entire catalogue and released all albums up to The Miracle on compact disc in the US. Each album contains at least one bonus track.

Subsequently, 14 albums (all studio albums up to The Miracle, as well as Live Killers and Greatest Hits) were remastered at Abbey Road Studios and released on CD and cassette in the United Kingdom between July 1993 and March 1994. Queen's entire album back catalog was remastered and re-released in the UK and the rest of the world (excluding the US) through 2011 to commemorate their 40th anniversary (as well as being the 20th anniversary of Mercury's death). The 2011 remasters were released by Universal's Island Records label, as the band's contract with EMI ended in 2010, and then on SACD by Universal Music Japan, between November 2011 and April 2012. In an interview with BBC Wales, Brian May announced a new compilation album titled Queen Forever, which was later released by Hollywood Records in November 2014.

In 2012, Queen were ranked as the seventh-biggest-selling singles artist in United Kingdom, with 12.6 million singles sold. In a time period stretching from 1991 up to October 1995, Queen sold five million copies in Italy alone.

== Albums ==
=== Studio albums ===
List of studio albums, with selected chart positions
Title	Album details	Peak chart positions										Certifications
Title	Album details	UK	AUS	AUT	FRA	GER	JPN	NLD	NOR	SWE	US	Certifications
Queen	Released: 13 July 1973; Label: EMI (#EMC 3006)	24	77	14	—	6	34	14	—	—	83	BPI: Gold; RIAA: Gold
Queen II	Released: 8 March 1974; Label: EMI (#EMA 767)	5	79	—	—	—	26	—	19	—	49	BPI: Gold
Sheer Heart Attack	Released: 8 November 1974; Label: EMI (#EMC 3061)	2	19	—	6	—	23	7	9	—	12	BPI: Platinum; RIAA: Gold
A Night at the Opera	Released: 28 November 1975; Label: EMI (#EMTC 103)	1	1	9	16	5	9	1	4	10	4	BPI: Platinum; BVMI: Platinum; IFPI AUT: Gold; RIAA: 3× Platinum
A Day at the Races	Released: 10 December 1976; Label: EMI (#EMTC 104)	1	8	8	—	10	1	1	3	8	5	BPI: Gold; BVMI: Gold; RIAA: Platinum
News of the World	Released: 28 October 1977; Label: EMI (#EMA 784)	4	8	9	1	7	3	1	4	9	3	BPI: Gold; BVMI: Platinum; NVPI: Platinum; RIAA: 4× Platinum; SNEP: Gold
Jazz	Released: 10 November 1978; Label: EMI (#EMA 788)	2	15	8	7	5	5	3	6	6	6	BPI: Gold; BVMI: Gold; IFPI AUT: Gold; NVPI: Platinum; RIAA: Platinum; SNEP: Gold
The Game	Released: 30 June 1980; Label: EMI (#EMA 795)	1	11	5	17	2	5	1	2	7	1	BPI: Gold; BVMI: Gold; IFPI AUT: Gold; NVPI: Gold; RIAA: 4× Platinum
Flash Gordon	Released: 8 December 1980; Label: EMI (#EMC 3351)	10	29	1	—	2	12	7	25	29	23	BPI: Gold
Hot Space	Released: 4 May 1982; Label: EMI (#EMA 797)	4	15	1	7	5	6	1	3	4	22	BPI: Gold; IFPI AUT: Gold; RIAA: Gold
The Works	Released: 27 February 1984; Label: EMI (#EMC 240014)	2	16	2	14	3	7	1	2	3	23	BPI: Platinum; BVMI: Platinum; IFPI AUT: Platinum; NVPI: Gold; RIAA: Gold
A Kind of Magic	Released: 2 June 1986; Label: EMI (#EU 3509)	1	12	3	6	4	25	2	5	9	46	BPI: 2× Platinum; BVMI: 3× Gold; IFPI AUT: Platinum; RIAA: Gold; SNEP: Gold
The Miracle	Released: 22 May 1989; Label: Parlophone (#PCSD 107)	1	4	1	11	1	23	1	2	6	24	BPI: Platinum; BVMI: Platinum; IFPI AUT: Gold; NVPI: Platinum; SNEP: Gold
Innuendo	Released: 4 February 1991; Label: Parlophone, Hollywood (#PCSD 115)	1	6	2	9	1	17	1	8	9	30	BPI: Platinum; BVMI: Platinum; IFPI AUT: Platinum; NVPI: Platinum; RIAA: Gold; SNEP: Platinum
Made in Heaven	Released: 6 November 1995; Label: Parlophone, Hollywood (#PCSD 167)	1	3	1	2	1	10	1	2	1	58	BPI: 4× Platinum; ARIA: Platinum; BVMI: 3× Platinum; IFPI AUT: 2× Platinum; IFPI NOR: Platinum; NVPI: 2× Platinum; RIAA: Gold; RIAJ: Platinum; SNEP: 2× Platinum
"—" denotes a recording that did not chart or was not released in that territory.

=== Live albums ===
List of live albums, with selected chart positions
Title	Album details	Peak chart positions										Certifications
Title	Album details	UK	AUS	AUT	FRA	GER	JPN	NLD	SWE	SWI	US	Certifications
Live Killers	Recorded: January–March 1979; Released: 22 June 1979; Label: EMI (#EMSP 330)	3	25	3	—	4	9	9	15	34	16	BPI: Gold; BVMI: Gold; IFPI AUT: Gold; IFPI SWI: Gold; NVPI: Gold; RIAA: 2× Platinum
Live Magic	Recorded: July–August 1986; Released: 1 December 1986; Label: EMI (#CDP 7464132)	3	51	13	—	15	49	24	50	26	—	BPI: Platinum; BVMI: Gold; IFPI AUT: Gold; IFPI SWI: Platinum
At the Beeb	Recorded: 5 February & 3 December 1973; Released: 4 December 1989; Label: Band of Joy (#BOJLP 001)	67	—	—	—	—	—	—	—	—	—	
Live at Wembley '86	Recorded: 12 July 1986; Released: 26 May 1992; Label: Parlophone, Hollywood (#CDPCSP 725)	2	96	6	2	20	81	12	29	6	53	BPI: Platinum; BVMI: Gold; IFPI AUT: Gold; IFPI SWI: Gold; NVPI: Gold; RIAA: Platinum; SNEP: Platinum
Queen on Fire – Live at the Bowl	Recorded: 5 June 1982; Released: 25 October 2004; Label: Parlophone, Hollywood (#8632112)	20	—	23	75	10	85	74	—	52	—	BPI: Gold; BVMI: Platinum; IFPI AUT: Gold; IFPI SWI: Gold
Queen Rock Montreal	Recorded: 24 & 25 November 1981; Released: 29 October 2007; Label: Parlophone, Hollywood (#5040472)	20	—	25	111	6	—	54	—	13	—	
Hungarian Rhapsody: Queen Live in Budapest	Recorded: 27 July 1986; Released: 20 September 2012; Label: Island, Hollywood	—	—	—	102	23	—	44	—	—	—	
Live at the Rainbow '74	Recorded: 31 March, 19 & 20 November 1974; Released: 8 September 2014; Label: Virgin EMI, Hollywood	11	99	12	55	9	28	7	—	19	66	
A Night at the Odeon – Hammersmith 1975	Recorded: 24 December 1975; Released: 20 November 2015; Label: Virgin EMI, Hollywood	40	175	57	118	34	—	28	—	31	—	
On Air	Recorded: February 1973 – October 1977; Released: 4 November 2016; Label: Virgin EMI, Hollywood	25	—	60	123	28	—	48	—	84	—	
"—" denotes a recording that did not chart or was not released in that territory.

=== Compilation albums ===
List of compilation albums, with selected chart positions
Title	Album details	Peak chart positions										Certifications
Title	Album details	UK	AUS	AUT	FRA^{[!]}	GER	JPN	NLD	SWE	SWI	US	Certifications
Greatest Hits	Released: 26 October 1981; Label: EMI, Elektra (#EMYV 30)	1	2	1	5^{[A]}	1	9	1	21	5	8	BPI: 26× Platinum; ARIA: 15× Platinum; BVMI: 7× Gold; IFPI AUT: 4× Platinum; IFPI SWE: Gold; IFPI SWI: 5× Platinum; NVPI: Platinum; RIAA: 9× Platinum; SNEP: 2× Platinum
Greatest Hits II	Released: 28 October 1991; Label: EMI/Parlophone, Hollywood Records (#PMTV 2)	1	4	1	1^{[B]}	2	34	1	2	1	16^{[C]}	BPI: 14× Platinum; ARIA: 8× Platinum; BVMI: 9× Gold; IFPI AUT: 4× Platinum; IFPI SWI: 5× Platinum; NVPI: 5× Platinum; SNEP: Diamond
Classic Queen	Released: 3 March 1992; Label: Hollywood	—	—	—	—	—	—	—	—	—	4	RIAA: 3× Platinum
The 12" Collection	Released: May 1992; Label: Parlophone/EMI	—	—	—	—	—	—	—	—	—	—	
Queen Rocks	Released: 3 November 1997; Label: Parlophone, Hollywood (#8230912)	7	—	16	—	12	22	14	51	16	—	BPI: Platinum; ARIA: Gold; SNEP: Gold
Greatest Hits III	Released: 8 November 1999; Label: Parlophone, Hollywood (#5238942)	5	77	2	9	5	25	8	19	4	—	BPI: 2× Platinum; BVMI: Gold; IFPI AUT: Gold; IFPI SWI: Gold; NVPI: Platinum
Jewels	Released: 28 January 2004; Label: Parlophone	—	—	—	—	—	1	—	—	—	—	
Stone Cold Classics	Released: 11 April 2006; Label: Hollywood	—	—	—	—	—	—	—	—	—	—	
The A–Z of Queen, Volume 1	Released: 10 July 2007; Label: Hollywood	—	—	—	—	—	—	—	—	—	—	
Absolute Greatest	Released: 11 November 2009; Label: Parlophone, Hollywood (#3091952)	3	18	10	11	23	23	36	5	15	195	BPI: 2× Platinum; ARIA: Gold; SNEP: Gold
Deep Cuts, Volume 1 (1973–1976)	Released: 14 March 2011; Label: Island	92	—	—	—	—	—	—	—	—	—	
Deep Cuts, Volume 2 (1977–1982)	Released: 27 June 2011; Label: Island	175	—	—	—	—	—	—	—	—	—	
Deep Cuts, Volume 3 (1984–1995)	Released: 5 September 2011; Label: Island	155	—	—	—	—	—	—	—	—	—	
Icon	Released: 11 June 2013; Label: Hollywood	—	—	—	—	—	—	—	—	—	—	
Queen Forever	Released: 10 November 2014; Label: Island, Hollywood	5	35	8	12	7	16	3	28	4	38	BPI: Gold; BVMI: Gold
Bohemian Rhapsody: The Original Soundtrack	Released: 19 October 2018; Label: Virgin EMI, Hollywood	3	1	7	—	8	—	11	21	2	2	2× BPI: Platinum; ARIA: 2× Platinum; RIAA: Gold; SNEP: 3× Platinum
Greatest Hits in Japan	Released: 15 January 2020; Label: Universal Music Japan	—	—	—	—	—	7	—	—	—	—	
Kizuna	Released: 31 January 2024; Label: Universal Music Japan	—	—	—	—	—	—	—	—	—	—	
Epic	Released: 12 June 2025; Label: Universal Music Group	—	—	—	—	—	—	—	—	—	—	
Heavy	Released: 20 June 2025; Label: Universal Music Group	—	—	—	—	—	—	—	—	—	—	
Riffs	Released: 27 June 2025; Label: Universal Music Group	—	—	—	—	—	—	—	—	—	—	
Pop	Released: 4 July 2025; Label: Universal Music Group	—	—	—	—	—	—	—	—	—	—	
Anthems	Released: 11 July 2025; Label: Universal Music Group	—	—	—	—	—	—	—	—	—	—	
Funk	Released: 18 July 2025; Label: Universal Music Group	—	—	—	—	—	—	—	—	—	—	
Ballads	Released: 25 July 2025; Label: Universal Music Group	—	—	—	—	—	—	—	—	—	—	
Slightly Mad	Released: 1 August 2025; Label: Universal Music Group	—	—	—	—	—	—	—	—	—	—	
Rock N Roll	Released: 8 August 2025; Label: Universal Music Group	—	—	—	—	—	—	—	—	—	—	
B-Sides	Released: 15 August 2025; Label: Universal Music Group	—	—	—	—	—	—	—	—	—	—	
Acoustic	Released: 22 August 2025; Label: Universal Music Group	—	—	—	—	—	—	—	—	—	—	

Notes

- Before 2011 compilation albums were not listed on the Top 200 Albums Chart in France, but instead on a separate chart for compilation albums only. The French chart positions here for the compilation albums are their peak positions on the French Compilation Albums Chart.
- A Greatest Hits charted originally at number 5 on the Compilation Albums Chart, but the remastered version in 2011 qualified for an entry on the Top 200 Albums Chart when it peaked at number 56 in March 2011.
- B Greatest Hits II charted originally at number 1 on the Compilation Albums Chart, but the remastered version in 2011 qualified for an entry on the Top 200 Albums Chart when it peaked at number 57 in March 2011.
- C Greatest Hits II did not enter the Billboard 200 chart, but peaked at number 16 on the Top Hard Rock Albums chart in January 2021.

=== Box sets ===
List of box sets, with selected chart positions
Title	Album details	Peak chart positions										Certifications
Title	Album details	UK	AUS	AUT	FRA^{[!]}	GER	NLD	NZL	SWE	SWI	US	Certifications
The Complete Works	Released: 2 December 1985; Label: EMI	—	—	—	—	—	—	—	—	—	—	
CD Single Box	Released: 26 April 1991 - Japan only; Label: EMI	—	—	—	—	—	—	—	—	—	—	
Box of Tricks	Released: 1992; Label: Parlophone/EMI	—	—	—	—	—	—	—	—	—	—	
Greatest Hits I & II	Released: 14 November 1994; Label: Parlophone/EMI, Hollywood (#CDPCSD 161)	—	50	30	—	26	14	2	—	—	^{[D]}	BPI: Gold; BVMI: Gold; IFPI SWI: Gold; NVPI: Platinum; RIAA: Platinum; SNEP: Gold
Ultimate Queen	Released: 13 November 1995; Label: Parlophone/EMI (#QUEENBOX20)	—	—	—	—	—	—	—	—	—	—	
The Crown Jewels	Released: 24 November 1998; Label: Parlophone, Hollywood	—	—	—	—	—	—	—	—	—	—	
The Platinum Collection: Greatest Hits I, II & III	Released: 13 November 2000; Label: Parlophone, Hollywood (#5298832)	2	4	3	13	5	5	10	4	4	6	BPI: 8× Platinum; ARIA: 2× Platinum; BVMI: Platinum; IFPI SWI: Gold; NVPI: 2× Platinum; RIAA: 5× Platinum; SNEP: 2× Platinum
The Singles Collection Volume 1	Released: 1 December 2008; Label: Parlophone/EMI	—	—	—	—	—	—	—	—	—	—	
The Singles Collection Volume 2	Released: 15 June 2009; Label: Parlophone/EMI	—	—	—	—	—	—	—	—	—	—	BPI: Silver
The Singles Collection Volume 3	Released: 31 May 2010; Label: Parlophone/EMI	—	—	—	—	—	—	—	—	—	—	
The Singles Collection Volume 4	Released: 18 October 2010; Label: Parlophone/EMI	—	—	—	—	—	—	—	—	—	—	
Queen: The Studio Collection	Released: 25 September 2015; Label: Virgin EMI	—	—	—	—	—	—	—	—	—	—	
The Miracle Collector's Edition	Released: 18 November 2022; Label: EMI, Hollywood	6	—	—	—	2	—	—	—	—	—	
Queen I Collector's Edition	Released: 25 October 2024; Label: EMI	10	—	—	—	—	—	—	—	—	—	
Queen II Collector's Edition	Released: 27 March 2026; Label: EMI	—	—	—	—	—	—	—	—	—	—	
"—" denotes albums that failed to chart or were not released.

Notes

- Before 2011 compilation albums were not listed on the Top 200 Albums Chart in France, but instead on a separate chart for compilation albums only. The French chart positions here for the compilation albums are their peak positions on the French Compilation Albums Chart.
- D Greatest Hits I and II did not enter the Billboard 200 chart, but peaked at number 3 on the Catalog Albums chart in January 2007.

== Extended plays ==
Title	EP details	Peak chart positions										Certifications
Title	EP details	UK	AUS	AUT	FRA	GER	IRE	NLD	NZL	SWI	US	Certifications
Queen's First E.P.	Released: 20 May 1977; Label: EMI	17	—	—	—	—	—	—	—	—	—	
Five Live (with George Michael and Lisa Stansfield)	Released: 19 April 1993; Label: Parlophone/EMI	1	17	2	12	8	1	2	9	6	46	BPI: Gold; BVMI: Gold; IFPI AUT: Gold; IFPI SWI: Gold; NVPI: Platinum

== Singles ==
=== 1970s ===
Title	Year	Peak chart positions										Certifications	Album
Title	Year	UK	AUS	AUT	BEL	CAN	GER	IRE	NLD	SWI	US	Certifications	Album
"Keep Yourself Alive"	1973	—	—	—	—	—	—	—	—	—	—		Queen
"Liar"	1974	—	—	—	—	—	—	—	—	—	—		Queen
"Seven Seas of Rhye"	1974	10	—	—	—	—	—	—	—	—	—	BPI: Silver	Queen II
"Killer Queen" / "Flick of the Wrist"	1974	2	24	10	7	15	12	2	3	—	12	BPI: 2× Platinum; BVMI: Gold; RIAA: 4× Platinum; RMNZ: 2× Platinum	Sheer Heart Attack
"Now I'm Here"	1975	11	—	—	—	—	25	14	29	—	—	BPI: Silver	Sheer Heart Attack
"Bohemian Rhapsody"	1975	1	1	8	1	1	7	1	1	4	9	BPI: 6× Platinum; ARIA: 8× Platinum; BVMI: 2× Platinum; MC: 7× Platinum; RIAA: Diamond; RMNZ: 9× Platinum	A Night at the Opera
"You're My Best Friend"	1976	7	40	—	23	2	—	3	6	—	16	BPI: Platinum; RIAA: Platinum; RMNZ: 2× Platinum	A Night at the Opera
"Somebody to Love"	1976	2	15	—	2	5	21	6	1	—	13	BPI: 2× Platinum; BVMI: Gold; RIAA: 5× Platinum; RMNZ: 3× Platinum	A Day at the Races
"Tie Your Mother Down"	1977	31	47	—	18	68	—	—	10	—	49		A Day at the Races
"Teo Torriatte (Let Us Cling Together)"	1977	—	—	—	—	—	—	—	—	—	—		A Day at the Races
"Good Old-Fashioned Lover Boy"	1977	17	—	—	—	—	—	—	—	—	—	BPI: Gold; RIAA: Gold; RMNZ: Gold	A Day at the Races
"Long Away"	1977	—	—	—	—	—	—	—	—	—	—		A Day at the Races
"We Are the Champions" / "We Will Rock You"	1977	2	8	12	10	3	13	3	2	—	4	BPI: 2× Platinum; BVMI: Platinum; RIAA: 4× Platinum; SNEP: Silver+Gold; RMNZ: 5× Platinum+4× Platinum	News of the World
"Spread Your Wings"	1978	34	—	—	—	—	29	—	26	—	—		News of the World
"It's Late"	1978	—	—	—	—	—	—	—	—	—	74		News of the World
"Bicycle Race" / "Fat Bottomed Girls"	1978	11	25	21	15	— 17	27	10	5	—	24	BPI: Platinum; RIAA: 2× Platinum; RMNZ: 2× Platinum	Jazz
"Don't Stop Me Now"	1979	9	53	38	23	—	35	10	16	52	86	BPI: 5× Platinum; BVMI: 3× Gold; ARIA: 5× Platinum; RIAA: 4× Platinum; RMNZ: 7× Platinum	Jazz
"Jealousy"	1979	—	—	—	—	—	—	—	—	—	—		Jazz
"Mustapha"	1979	—	—	—	—	—	—	—	—	—	—		Jazz
"Love of My Life" (live)	1979	63	—	—	—	—	—	—	—	—	—	BPI: Platinum; RIAA: Gold; RMNZ: Platinum	Live Killers
"Crazy Little Thing Called Love"	1979	2	1	9	3	1	13	2	1	5	1	BPI: Platinum; BVMI: Gold; NVPI: Gold; RIAA: Platinum; RMNZ: 4× Platinum	The Game

=== 1980s ===
Title	Year	Peak chart positions										Certifications	Album
Title	Year	UK	AUS	AUT	BEL	CAN	GER	IRE	NLD	SWI	US	Certifications	Album
"Save Me"	1980	11	76	—	13	—	42	8	6	—	—	BPI: Silver	The Game
"Play the Game"	1980	14	85	—	25	22	40	9	10	8	42		The Game
"Another One Bites the Dust"	1980	7	5	6	9	1	6	4	1	8	1	BPI: 4× Platinum; ARIA: 4× Platinum; BVMI: Platinum; RIAA: 9× Platinum; RMNZ: 6× Platinum	The Game
"Need Your Loving Tonight"	1980	—	—	—	—	—	—	—	—	—	44		The Game
"Flash"	1980	10	16	1	19	24	3	10	13	—	42	BPI: Silver	Flash Gordon
"Under Pressure" (with David Bowie)	1981	1	6	10	5	3	21	2	1	10	29	BPI: 4× Platinum; ARIA: 3× Platinum; RIAA: 4× Platinum; RMNZ: 7× Platinum	Hot Space
"Body Language"	1982	25	23	11	17	3	27	13	4	—	11		Hot Space
"Las Palabras de Amor (The Words of Love)"	1982	17	—	—	26	—	68	10	18	13	—		Hot Space
"Calling All Girls"	1982	—	—	—	—	33	—	—	—	—	60		Hot Space
"Staying Power"	1982	—	—	—	—	—	—	—	—	—	—		Hot Space
"Back Chat"	1982	40	—	—	—	—	69	19	—	—	—		Hot Space
"Radio Ga Ga"	1984	2	2	2	1	11	2	1	2	3	16	BPI: 2× Platinum; BVMI: Gold; RIAA: Platinum; RMNZ: 2× Platinum	The Works
"I Want to Break Free"	1984	3	8	1	1	26	4	2	1	2	45	BPI: 2× Platinum; BVMI: Platinum; RIAA: Platinum; RMNZ: 4× Platinum	The Works
"It's a Hard Life"	1984	6	65	—	—	—	26	2	20	—	72		The Works
"Hammer to Fall"	1984	13	69	—	—	—	—	10	—	—	—	BPI: Gold; RMNZ: Gold	The Works
"Thank God It's Christmas"	1984	21	80	15	11	—	8	8	19	22	—	BPI: Gold; BVMI: Platinum; RMNZ: Platinum	Non-album single
"One Vision"	1985	7	35	—	28	76	26	5	21	24	61	BPI: Silver	A Kind of Magic
"A Kind of Magic"	1986	3	25	12	4	64	6	4	5	4	42	BPI: Platinum; RMNZ: Platinum	A Kind of Magic
"Princes of the Universe"	1986	—	32	—	—	—	—	—	—	—	—		A Kind of Magic
"Friends Will Be Friends"	1986	14	—	—	18	—	20	4	16	19	—		A Kind of Magic
"Pain Is So Close to Pleasure"	1986	—	—	—	27	—	57	—	43	—	—		A Kind of Magic
"Who Wants to Live Forever"	1986	24	—	—	—	—	52	15	—	—	—	BPI: Platinum; RMNZ: Gold	A Kind of Magic
"One Year of Love"	1986	—	—	—	—	—	—	—	—	—	—		A Kind of Magic
"I Want It All"	1989	3	10	11	10	34	9	3	2	8	50	BPI: Gold; RIAA: Gold; RMNZ: Platinum	The Miracle
"Breakthru"	1989	7	45	—	10	—	24	6	6	28	—		The Miracle
"The Invisible Man"	1989	12	118	—	13	—	31	10	6	30	—		The Miracle
"Scandal"	1989	25	158	—	29	—	—	14	12	—	—		The Miracle
"The Miracle"	1989	21	151	—	28	—	78	23	16	—	—		The Miracle

=== 1990s ===
Title	Year	Peak chart positions										Certifications	Album
Title	Year	UK	AUS	AUT	BEL	FRA	GER	IRE	NLD	NZL	SWI	Certifications	Album
"Innuendo"	1991	1	28	12	8	—	5	4	4	10	3	BPI: Silver	Innuendo
"I'm Going Slightly Mad"	1991	22	176	—	39	—	42	19	20	—			Innuendo
"Headlong"	1991	14	119	—	—	—	—	25	43	—	—		Innuendo
"These Are the Days of Our Lives"	1991	—	—	—	40	—	—	—	—	—	—	BPI: Gold	Innuendo
"The Show Must Go On"	1991	16	75	—	22	2	7	17	6	20	11	BPI: Platinum; BVMI: Gold; RIAA: Gold; SNEP: Gold; RMNZ: Platinum	Innuendo
"Heaven for Everyone"	1995	2	15	4	4	8	15	7	2	25	9	BPI: Silver; SNEP: Silver	Made in Heaven
"Too Much Love Will Kill You"	1995	15	—	—	10	—	—	28	—	—	—	BPI: Silver	Made in Heaven
"A Winter's Tale"	1995	6	71	23	33	—	62	23	16	—	28		Made in Heaven
"You Don't Fool Me"	1996	17	125	23	13	14	26	23	22	—	27		Made in Heaven
"I Was Born to Love You"	1996	—	—	—	—	—	—	—	—	—	—		Made in Heaven
"Let Me Live"	1996	9	136	—	—	—	67	—	28	—	—		Made in Heaven
"No-One but You (Only the Good Die Young)" / "Tie Your Mother Down"	1997	13	111	—	—	—	75	—	33	—	—		Queen Rocks
"Under Pressure (Rah Mix)" (with David Bowie)	1999	14	—	—	—	—	—	—	21	—	—		Greatest Hits III

=== 2010s ===
Title	Year	Peak chart positions					Album
Title	Year	BEL	FRA	JPN	SPA	US Rock	Album
"Stormtroopers In Stilettos"	2011	—	—	—	—	—	A Night at the Opera (2011 edition) Sheer Heart Attack
"Let Me in Your Heart Again"	2014	40	133	—	24	47	Queen Forever

=== 2020s ===
Title	Year	Peak chart positions				Album
Title	Year	UK	NZ Hot	SWI	US Dig.	Album
"Face It Alone"	2022	90	17	26	36	The Miracle Collector's Edition
"Machines (Or 'Back to Humans')"	2023	—	—	—	—	The Works
"Cool Cat"	2024	—	—	—	—	Hot Space
"Thank God It's Christmas... Again!"	2026	—	—	—	—	Non-album single

=== Promotional singles and other charting songs ===
Title	Year	Airplay charts		Album
Title	Year	POL	US Main. Rock	Album
"Put Out the Fire"	1982	—	15	Hot Space
"Life Is Real (Song for Lennon)"	1982	—	57	Hot Space
"Tear It Up"	1984	—	52	The Works
"Under Pressure" (live)	1986	—	—	Live Magic
"I Can't Live with You"	1991	—	28	Innuendo
"Ride the Wild Wind"	1991	1	—	Innuendo
"Stone Cold Crazy" (1991 remix)	1991	—	—	Sheer Heart Attack
"A Kind of Magic / Radio Ga Ga"	2003	—	—	The Platinum Collection
"I'm in Love with My Car"	2004	—	—	Greatest Hits (We Will Rock You edition)
"Teo Torriatte (Let Us Cling Together)"	2005	—	—	Jewels II
"Love Kills – the Ballad"	2015	—	—	Queen Forever
"—" denotes releases that did not chart or were not released in that territory.

=== As featured / collaborating artist ===
Title	Year	Peak chart positions										Album
Title	Year	UK	AUS	AUT	FRA	GER	IRE	NLD	NZL	SWI	US	Album
"Somebody to Love" (live) (with George Michael)	1993	1	19	15	16	21	1	6	8	—	30	Five Live (George Michael and Queen with Lisa Stansfield)
"We Will Rock You" (with Five)	2000	1	3	2	—	8	6	15	29	18	—	Invincible (Five)
"Flash" (Queen + Vanguard)	2003	15	95	44	—	17	43	—	—	—	—	
"Reaching Out" / "Tie Your Mother Down" (Queen + Paul Rodgers)	2005	—	—	—	—	—	—	27	—	—	—	Return of the Champions (Queen + Paul Rodgers)
"Say It's Not True" (Queen + Paul Rodgers)	2007	90	—	—	75	82	—	62	—	—	—	The Cosmos Rocks (Queen + Paul Rodgers)
"C-lebrity" (Queen + Paul Rodgers)	2008	33	—	—	96	67	—	50	—	—	—	The Cosmos Rocks (Queen + Paul Rodgers)
"We Believe" (Queen + Paul Rodgers)	2008	—	—	—	—	—	—	—	—	—	—	The Cosmos Rocks (Queen + Paul Rodgers)
"Bohemian Rhapsody" (Queen + the Muppets)	2009	32	—	—	—	—	—	—	—	—	—	
"We Will Rock You Von Lichten" (Queen + Von Lichten)	2012	—	—	—	—	—	—	—	—	—	—	
"You Are the Champions" (Queen + Adam Lambert)	2020	95	—	—	—	—	—	—	—	—	—	
"We Will Rock You (Megan Thee Stallion version)" (with Megan Thee Stallion)	2024	—	—	—	—	—	—	—	—	—	—	

Promotional singles

Title	Year	Album
"We Are the Champions" (Queen + Robbie Williams)	2001	A Knight's Tale: Music from the Motion Picture
"We Will Rock You"^{[A]} (Queen + John Farnham)	2003	True Colors: The World in Union
"We Will Rock You / We Are The Champions (Live)" (Queen + Paul Rodgers)	2005	Return of the Champions
"Call Me" (Queen + Paul Rodgers)	2008	The Cosmos Rocks

Notes

- A The song was also released on John Farnham's 2003 compilation album One Voice: Greatest Hits.

== Chart re-entries ==
Title	Year	Peak chart positions										Album
Title	Year	UK	AUS	AUT	CAN	FRA	GER	IRE	NLD	SWI	US	Album
"Don't Stop Me Now"	2007	47	—	—	—	68	—	26	—	—	—	Jazz
"Bohemian Rhapsody"	2009	93	—	—	—	—	—	19	—	—	—	Absolute Greatest
"Who Wants to Live Forever"	2009	63	—	—	—	—	—	—	—	—	—	Absolute Greatest
"Under Pressure" (with David Bowie)	2016	—	—	—	—	20	—	—	—	—	45	Hot Space
"Bohemian Rhapsody"	2018	45	17	30	26	—	58	46	54	21	33	Bohemian Rhapsody: The Original Soundtrack
"Another One Bites the Dust"	2018	93	37	—	—	84	—	—	—	—	—	Bohemian Rhapsody: The Original Soundtrack
"Killer Queen"	2018	—	85	—	—	—	—	—	—	—	—	Bohemian Rhapsody: The Original Soundtrack
"Somebody to Love"	2018	—	47	—	—	—	—	—	—	—	—	Bohemian Rhapsody: The Original Soundtrack
"Don't Stop Me Now"	2018	83	53	38	—	—	—	—	97	52	—	Jazz
"Thank God It's Christmas"	2019	86	80	38	—	—	43	—	65	36	—	Non-album single
"Love of My Life"	2019	—	—	—	—	—	—	—	93	—	—	A Night at the Opera
"Thank God It's Christmas"	2021	88	—	—	—	—	—	—	—	—	—	Non-album single
"Thank God It's Christmas"	2022	79	—	—	—	—	—	—	—	—	—	Non-album single
"Thank God It's Christmas"	2023	76	—	—	—	—	—	—	—	—	—	Non-album single
"Thank God It's Christmas"	2024	74	—	—	—	—	—	—	—	—	—	Non-album single

== Collaborations and other appearances ==
Year	Album/single	Collaborator	Comment
2002	Party at the Palace	Various Artists	Queen appearance on the live album include the songs "God Save the Queen", "Radio Ga Ga", "We Will Rock You" and "We Are the Champions" performed with contribution from various artists. The DVD release also included "Bohemian Rhapsody".
2004	46664: The Event	Various Artists	Queen appearance on the live album spawned on three CD's include the songs "Say It’s Not True", "Invincible Hope", "46664: The Call", "The Show Must Go On", "Is This the World We Created", "Amandla", "Bohemian Rhapsody", "I Want It All", "I Want to Break Free", "Radio Ga Ga", "We Will Rock You" and "We Are the Champions". Performances featured a number of guest musicians on lead vocals.
2005	46664: One Year On	Various Artists	4-track EP includes a new song "Invincible Hope" credited to Queen + Nelson Mandela
2011	Sucker Punch: Original Motion Picture Soundtrack	Various Artists	The album features a mashup of the songs "I Want It All" / "We Will Rock You" credited to Queen With Armageddon AKA Geddy
2012	A Symphony of British Music	Various Artists	The album features live tracks "Queen Medley: Day-O/Brighton Rock" and "We Will Rock You", the latter featuring Jessie J on lead vocals
2018	Beside Bowie: The Mick Ronson Story The Soundtrack	Various Artists	The album includes Queen + David Bowie performances of the songs "All the Young Dudes" and "Heroes" from The Freddie Mercury Tribute Concert
2020	Artists Unite for Fire Fight: Concert for National Bushfire Relief	Various Artists	The album includes Queen + Adam Lambert performance of the song "Hammer to Fall"

== Video games ==
Title	Album details
Queen: The eYe	Released: 1998; Publisher: Electronic Arts; Format: 5× CD
Queen: Play the Game	Released: 2015; Publisher: Soshi Games; Format: Mobile
Queen Rock Tour	Released: 2021; Publisher: Universal Music Group; Format: Mobile

== Music videos ==
Title	Year	Director
"Keep Yourself Alive"	1973	Bruce Gowers (version I); Mike Mansfield (version II)
"Liar"	1973	Bruce Gowers (version I); Mike Mansfield (version II)
"Seven Seas of Rhye"	1974	unknown (promotional)
"Killer Queen"	1974	Robin Nash
"Now I'm Here"	1974	Bruce Gowers
"Bohemian Rhapsody"	1975	Bruce Gowers
"I'm in Love with My Car"	1975	Doro Productions (promo)
"You're My Best Friend"	1976	Bruce Gowers
"Somebody to Love"	1976	Bruce Gowers
"Tie Your Mother Down"	1977	Bruce Gowers
"Good Old-Fashioned Lover Boy"	1977	Rudi Dolezal; Hannes Rossacher
"We Are the Champions"	1977	Derek Burbridge
"We Will Rock You"	1978	Rock Flicks
"Spread Your Wings"	1978	Rock Flicks
"Bicycle Race"	1978	Denis de Vallance
"Fat Bottomed Girls"	1978	Denis de Vallance
"Don't Stop Me Now"	1979	J. Kliebenstein
"Love of My Life"	1979	Denis de Vallance
"Crazy Little Thing Called Love"	1979	Denis de Vallance
"Save Me"	1979	Keith "Keef" MacMillan
"Play the Game"	1980	Brian Grant
"Another One Bites the Dust"	1980	Daniella Green
"Flash"	1980	Don Norman
"Under Pressure" (with David Bowie)	1981	David Mallet
"Body Language"	1982	Mike Hodges
"Las Palabras de Amor (The Words of Love)"	1982	Unknown, promotional (Top Of The Top, BBC)
"Calling All Girls"	1982	Brian Grant
"Back Chat"	1982	Brian Grant
"Radio Ga Ga"	1984	David Mallet
"I Want to Break Free"	1984	David Mallet
"It's a Hard Life"	1984	Tim Pope
"Hammer to Fall"	1984	David Mallet
"One Vision"	1985	Rudi Dolezal; Hannes Rossacher
"A Kind of Magic"	1986	Russell Mulcahy
"Princes of the Universe"	1986	Russell Mulcahy
"Friends Will Be Friends"	1986	Rudi Dolezal; Hannes Rossacher
"Who Wants to Live Forever"	1986	David Mallet
"I Want It All"	1989	David Mallet
"Breakthru"	1989	Rudi Dolezal; Hannes Rossacher
"The Invisible Man"	1989	Rudi Dolezal; Hannes Rossacher
"Scandal"	1989	Rudi Dolezal; Hannes Rossacher
"The Miracle"	1989	Rudi Dolezal; Hannes Rossacher
"Innuendo"	1990	Rudi Dolezal; Hannes Rossacher
"I'm Going Slightly Mad"	1991	Rudi Dolezal; Hannes Rossacher
"Headlong"	1991	Rudi Dolezal; Hannes Rossacher
"These Are the Days of Our Lives"	1991	Rudi Dolezal; Hannes Rossacher
"The Show Must Go On"	1991	Rudi Dolezal; Hannes Rossacher
"Seven Seas of Rhye" (VHS version, II)	1992	Rudi Dolezal; Hannes Rossacher
"Somebody to Love" (live) (Queen + George Michael)	1992	David Mallet
"Heaven for Everyone"	1995	David Mallet
"A Winter's Tale"	1995	Rudi Dolezal; Hannes Rossacher
"Too Much Love Will Kill You"	1996	Rudi Dolezal; Hannes Rossacher
"Let Me Live"	1996	Bernard Rudden
"You Don't Fool Me"	1996	Mark Szaszy
"I Was Born to Love You" (Made in Heaven version)	1996	Richard Heslop
"The Show Must Go On" (live) (Queen + Elton John)	1997	Rudi Dolezal; Hannes Rossacher
"No-One but You (Only the Good Die Young)"	1997	Rudi Dolezal; Hannes Rossacher
"Another One Bites the Dust" (Small Soldiers remix)	1998	Michel Gondry
"Under Pressure" (Rah mix)	1999	Rudi Dolezal; Hannes Rossacher
"Teo Torriatte"	2005	—
"Another One Bites the Dust" (Cedric Gervais & Second Sun Radio Edit)	2006	—
"Let Me in Your Heart Again" (William Orbit mix)	2014	—
"Let Me in Your Heart Again" (Queen version)	2014	—
"All Dead, All Dead"	2017	Jason Jameson; Robert Milne
"Thank God, It's Christmas"	2019	Justin Moon; Drew Gleason
"Face It Alone"	2022	—
"Was It All Worth It"	2022	—
"The Night Comes Down"	2024	—

== See also ==
- Queen videography
- Brian May discography
- Freddie Mercury discography
- Roger Taylor discography
- Queen + Paul Rodgers Discography
