= The Singles Collection Volume 2 =

Box set by Queen
- Released: 15 June 2009
- Recorded: 1979–1984
- Genre: Rock
- Length: 1:43:16
- Label: Parlophone/EMI
- Producers: Queen; Mack; Arif Mardin; David Bowie

Queen chronology
The Singles Collection Volume 1 (2008)	The Singles Collection Volume 2 (2009)	Absolute Greatest (2009)

The Singles Collection, Volume 2 is a limited edition CD series compilation box set by the British rock band Queen, released in 2009. The box set contains remastered versions of the next thirteen top-40 charting singles released by Queen that appear subsequent to those in the first volume.

The collection is notable for containing tracks that have never before been officially released on CD, namely A Human Body (previously only available as a 7" vinyl b-side) and Back Chat (which was remixed for single release, and has only ever been available on the original 7"). The live tracks are taken from Queen's Live Killers album.

== Track listing ==
Disc 1

1. "Love of My Life" (Live) – 3:43
2. "Now I'm Here" (Live) – 8:42

Disc 2

1. "Crazy Little Thing Called Love" – 2:44
2. "We Will Rock You (Fast)" (Live) – 3:07

Disc 3

1. "Save Me" – 3:49
2. "Let Me Entertain You" (Live) – 3:14

Disc 4

1. "Play the Game" – 3:32
2. "A Human Body" – 3:42

Disc 5

1. "Another One Bites the Dust" – 3:36
2. "Dragon Attack" – 4:19

Disc 6

1. "Flash Theme" – 2:51
2. "Football Fight" – 1:29

Disc 7

1. "Under Pressure" (with David Bowie) – 4:07
2. "Soul Brother" – 3:38

Disc 8

1. "Body Language" – 4:34
2. "Life Is Real" – 3:30

Disc 9

1. "Las Palabras de Amor" – 4:31
2. "Cool Cat" – 3:28

Disc 10

1. "Calling All Girls" – 3:53
2. "Put Out the Fire" – 3:19

Disc 11

1. "Back Chat" (Single Remix) – 4:12
2. "Staying Power" – 4:11

Disc 12

1. "Radio Ga Ga" – 5:50
2. "I Go Crazy" – 3:42

Disc 13

1. "I Want to Break Free" (Single Version) – 4:25
2. "Machines (Or 'Back to Humans')" – 5:08
