= The A–Z of Queen, Volume 1 =

Greatest hits album by Queen
- Released: 10 July 2007
- Recorded: 1975–1990
- Genre: Rock
- Length: 42:55
- Label: Hollywood

Queen chronology
Stone Cold Classics (2006)	The A–Z of Queen, Volume 1 (2007)	Queen Rock Montreal (2007)

The A–Z of Queen, Volume 1 is a compilation album by the British rock band Queen, released in 2007.

The album is a 2-disc set available only from Wal-Mart and Amazon that features an audio CD and video DVD with music videos and live performances. Some of the video performances feature Paul Rodgers playing with Brian May and Roger Taylor as Queen + Paul Rodgers in 2005. To date no further volumes have been released.

== Track listings ==
=== CD ===
1. "A Kind of Magic" (Roger Taylor) – 4:24
2. "Another One Bites the Dust" (John Deacon) – 3:34
3. "Bohemian Rhapsody" (Freddie Mercury) – 5:53
4. "Bicycle Race" (Mercury) – 3:01
5. "I Want It All" (Single Version) (Brian May) – 4:00
6. "Crazy Little Thing Called Love" (Mercury) – 2:42
7. "Don't Stop Me Now" (Mercury) – 3:29
8. "Fat Bottomed Girls" (Single Version) (May) – 3:25
9. "Flash" (Single Version) (May) – 2:49
10. "Innuendo" (Queen) – 6:31
11. "Good Old-Fashioned Lover Boy" (Mercury) – 2:53

=== DVD ===
1. "A Kind of Magic" (from Greatest Video Hits 2)
2. "Another One Bites the Dust" (from Queen on Fire - Live at the Bowl)
3. "Bohemian Rhapsody" (from Greatest Video Hits 1)
4. "I Want It All" (from Return of the Champions)
5. "Crazy Little Thing Called Love" (Live at Wembley Stadium, Saturday 12 July 1986, from Queen at Wembley)
6. "Don't Stop Me Now" (from Greatest Video Hits 1)
7. "Fat Bottomed Girls" (from Return of the Champions)
8. "Innuendo" (original promo video from the album Innuendo)
9. "Wembley Stadium Concert Interview" (from Queen at Wembley)
