= Queen videography =

This is the videography of the British rock band Queen.

== List ==
=== 1981-1989 ===
Information
Greatest Flix
- Released:2 November 1981
- Format(s): VHS, Laserdisc, CED
Live in Japan
- Released:1983 (Japan only)
- Format(s): VHS, Laserdisc
We Will Rock You
- Released:10 September 1984
- Format(s): VHS, Laserdisc, DVD (30 October 2001)
- Chart position(s): USA (2× platinum)
The Works Video EP
- Released:19 November 1984
- Format(s): VHS
Live in Rio
- Released:13 May 1985
- Format(s): VHS, Laserdisc, DVD (2013 USA and Canada 6 DVD Box Set)
Who Wants to Live Forever
- Released:20 October 1986
- Format(s): VHS
Live in Budapest
- Released:16 February 1987
- Format(s): VHS, Laserdisc
Bohemian Rhapsody
- Released:30 March 1987
- Format(s): VHS
The Magic Years
- Released:30 November 1987
- Format(s): VHS, Laserdisc
Rare Live
- Released:21 August 1989
- Format(s): VHS, Laserdisc
The Miracle Video EP
- Released:27 November 1989
- Format(s): VHS

=== 1990-1999 ===
Information
Queen at Wembley
- Released:3 December 1990
- Format(s): VHS, Laserdisc, DVD (17 June 2003)
- Chart position(s): #1: Australia, Austria, Germany, Italy, Netherlands, Portugal (11× platinum, 44.000 copies), Spain, UK (7× platinum); #2: Greece, Ireland; #3: Norway, Sweden; #4: Denmark, France; #?(diamond): US (5× platinum)
- AUS: 4× Platinum
Greatest Flix II
- Released:28 October 1991
- Format(s): VHS, Laserdisc
Box of Flix
- Released:28 October 1991
- Format(s): VHS
Live at the Rainbow
- Released:May 1992
- Format(s): VHS (in box set called: Box of Tricks)
  (filmed 19 and 20 November 1974 at the Rainbow Theatre)
Classic Queen
- Released:13 October 1992 (United States only)
- Format(s): VHS
Greatest Hits
- Released:13 October 1992 (United States only)
- Format(s): VHS
We Are the Champions: Final Live in Japan
- Released:1992 (Japan only)
- Format(s): VHS, Laserdisc, DVD (2 June 2004), Blu-ray (11 May 2019)
- Chart position(s): #1: Japan
The Freddie Mercury Tribute Concert
- Released:23 November 1992
- Format(s): VHS, DVD (April 2002), SD Blu-ray (2013)
- Chart position(s): #1: UK, #5: Germany
- AUS: Platinum
Greatest Flix I & II
- Released:1994
- Format(s): Video CD (1994 EU & Thailand), DVD (1997 UK Limited Edition Promotional Only), LaserDisc (1997 UK)
Champions of the World
- Released:6 November 1995
- Format(s): Video CD, VHS
Made in Heaven
- Released:11 November 1996
- Format(s): VHS, DVD (2003)
Greatest Karaoke Flix
- Released:1998
- Format(s): DVD, Laserdisc (Japan Only)
Queen Rocks
- Released:1999
- Format(s): VHS
Greatest Flix III
- Released:6 December 1999
- Format(s): VHS, Laserdisc (Japan Only)

=== 2000-2009 ===
Information
Party at the Palace (various artists)
- Released:2002
- Format(s): DVD
Greatest Video Hits 1
- Released:12 October 2002
- Format(s): DVD
- Chart position(s): #1: Germany, Spain, UK, USA (platinum); #2: Australia, Denmark, Sweden; #3: Italy
- AUS: 6× Platinum
Greatest Video Hits 2
- Released:25 November 2003
- Format(s): DVD
- Chart position(s): #1: Ireland, UK (2× platinum, 100.000); #2: Spain; #4: Germany, Italy
- AUS: PLatinum
Jewels
- Released:28 April 2004 (Japan only)
- Format(s): DVD
- Chart position(s): #1: Japan
46664 – The Event (various artists)
- Released:2004
- Format(s): DVD
Queen on Fire - Live at the Bowl
- Released:25 October 2004
- Format(s): DVD
- Chart position(s): #1: Austria, Belgium, Germany (4 weeks), Italy, Japan (on international charts), Sweden, UK (2 weeks, 3× platinum, 150.000); #2: New Zealand, Portugal (2× platinum, 8.000); #4: Norway; #5: France; #?(3× platinum) US (platinum)
- AUS: 3× Platinum
Live Aid (various artists)
- Released:8 November 2004
- Format(s): DVD
- Chart position(s): #1: UK
Return of the Champions (Queen + Paul Rodgers)
- Released:18 October 2005
- Format(s): DVD
- Chart position(s): #1: Japan (on international charts), UK (platinum); #2: Austria, Germany, Netherlands; #3: Sweden; #4: Italy; #7: Portugal
- AUS: Gold
The Making of A Night at the Opera — Classic Albums
- Released:20 March 2006
- Format(s):
- Chart position(s): #3: UK
- AUS: Platinum
Super Live in Japan (Queen + Paul Rodgers)
- Released:28 April 2006 (Japan only)
- Format(s): DVD
Queen Rock Montreal
- Released:29 October 2007
- Format(s): DVD, HD DVD, Blu-ray
- Chart position(s): #1 Portugal, Sweden, Italy, Holland #2 Switzerland, Japan, UK #3 Germany #4 Austria, Belgium, Mexico, Hong Kong #5 Canada (2xPlatinum), Australia / New Zealand #6 Denmark #9 Norway #13 France #23USA
- AUS: Gold

=== 2010-2019 ===
Information
Queen - Days of Our Lives
- Released:28 November 2011
- Format(s): DVD, Blu-ray
Greatest Video Hits
- Released:28 August 2012 (USA and Canada only)
- Format(s): DVD
Queen: Budapest
- Released:5 November 2012
- Format(s): DVD, DVD/2 CD Deluxe, Blu-Ray, Blu-Ray/2 CD Deluxe
- Chart position(s): #1 Belgium #8 Spain, Sweden, Austria, Australia #12 Hungary #6 Denmark #43 Czech Republic #10 Netherlands
Live at the Rainbow '74
- Released:8 September 2014
- Format(s): single CD, double CD, DVD, SD Blu-ray, SD Blu-ray plus CD, double vinyl, Quadruple vinyl, as well as a Deluxe Box Set including reproduction tour memorabilia.
A Night at the Odeon – Hammersmith 1975
- Released:20 November 2015
- Format(s): single CD, CD plus DVD, DVD, SD Blu-ray, double vinyl, as well as a Deluxe Box Set including reproduction tour memorabilia.
