= Jewels (Queen album) =

Compilation album by Queen
- Released: 28 January 2004
- Recorded: 1974–1995
- Genre: Rock
- Length: 53:43
- Label: Parlophone

Queen chronology
The Platinum Collection (2000)	Jewels (2004)	Queen on Fire - Live at the Bowl (2004)

Jewels is a compilation album by the British rock band Queen, released on 28 January 2004. The album was released only in Japan on CD and is a Japan-exclusive 24 bit digitally remastered compilation CD featuring extensive liner notes in Japanese and obi-strip.

It was released alongside a DVD that bears the same name, which includes the official videos of the songs that make up the album plus two bonus tracks.

On 26 January 2005 the album Jewels II was released in CD format, also only in Japan. To complete the collection, on 30 September 2005, Jewels I & II: Japan Tour 2005 Special Edition was launched to promote the Queen + Paul Rodgers Tour in that country. It includes a CD with all the songs of Jewels and Jewels II, and an extra CD with two live videos of the concert of Queen in the Milton Keynes Bowl the 5 of June 1982.

== Track listing ==
No.	Title	Writer(s)	Length
1.	"I Was Born to Love You" (from Made in Heaven, 1995)	Freddie Mercury	4:50
2.	"We Will Rock You" (from News of the World, 1977)	Brian May	2:01
3.	"We Are the Champions" (from News of the World, 1977)	Freddie Mercury	3:01
4.	"Don't Stop Me Now" (from Jazz, 1979)	Freddie Mercury	3:29
5.	"Too Much Love Will Kill You" (from Made in Heaven, 1995)	Brian May	4:19
6.	"Let Me Live" (from Made in Heaven, 1995)	Queen	4:45
7.	"You're My Best Friend" (from A Night at the Opera, 1975)	John Deacon	2:50
8.	"Under Pressure" (with David Bowie; from Hot Space, 1982)	Queen and David Bowie	3:56
9.	"Radio Ga Ga" (from The Works, 1984)	Roger Taylor	5:48
10.	"Somebody to Love" (from A Day at the Races, 1976)	Freddie Mercury	4:56
11.	"Killer Queen" (from Sheer Heart Attack, 1974)	Freddie Mercury	2:59
12.	"Another One Bites the Dust" (from The Game, 1980)	John Deacon	3:34
13.	"Crazy Little Thing Called Love" (from The Game, 1980)	Freddie Mercury	2:49
14.	"Flash" (from Flash Gordon: Original Soundtrack Music by Queen, 1980)	Brian May	2:49
15.	"The Show Must Go On" (from Innuendo, 1991)	Queen	4:24
16.	"Bohemian Rhapsody" (from A Night at the Opera, 1975)	Freddie Mercury	5:54

=== Jewels (DVD) ===
1. "I Was Born to Love You" (2004 Video)
2. "We Will Rock You"
3. "We Are the Champions"
4. "Don't Stop Me Now"
5. "Too Much Love Will Kill You"
6. "You're My Best Friend"
7. "Under Pressure"
8. "Radio Ga Ga"
9. "Somebody to Love"
10. "Killer Queen"
11. "Another One Bites the Dust"
12. "Crazy Little Thing Called Love"
13. "Flash"
14. "The Show Must Go On"
15. "Bohemian Rhapsody"
16. "I'm Going Slightly Mad" (bonus track)
17. "Let Me Live" (photo gallery; bonus track)

== Accolades ==
Year	Organization	Award	Result	Ref.
2005	Japan Gold Disc Award	Rock and Pop Album of the Year (Western)	Won	

== Charts and certifications ==
=== Weekly charts ===
Chart (2004)	Peak position
Japan Albums (Oricon)	1

=== Year-end charts ===
Chart (2004)	Peak position
Japan Albums (Oricon)	3

=== Certifications ===
Region	Certification	Certified units/sales
Japan (RIAJ)	Million	1,000,000^{^}
^{^} Shipments figures based on certification alone.
