= Hot Space Tour =

1982 concert tour by Queen

- World tour by Queen
- Poster to the concert in Richfield, USA
- Location: Asia; Europe; North America
- Associated album: Hot Space
- Start date: 9 April 1982
- End date: 3 November 1982
- Legs: 3
- No. of shows: 30 in Europe; 33 in North America; 6 in Asia; 69 in total
- Box office: $2.605 million ($8.69 million in 2025 dollars)

Queen concert chronology
- The Game Tour (1980–1981); Hot Space Tour (1982); The Works Tour (1984–1985)

The Hot Space Tour was the ninth headlining concert tour by the British rock band Queen in support of their 1982 album Hot Space. The tour started on the 9th of April in Gothenburg, Sweden and ended, after sixty-nine concerts, in Tokorozawa, Japan on the 3rd of November.

== Background ==
The tour saw many changes to Queen's show. The tour was the first in which the band used a keyboardist, playing in the background. For the European leg of the tour, they used Morgan Fisher. Fisher is best known for having been a member of Mott the Hoople in the 1970s. Queen were the opening act for Mott the Hoople's US Tour of 1974, so the band already had close connections with Fisher prior to the tour. Another connection which Fisher had with the band was through a short-lived progressive rock band called Morgan, which he formed with Tim Staffell, who was the bass guitarist and lead vocalist for the pre-Queen band Smile.

Unlike most tours, in which the band would normally only need a few nights to become comfortable with a setlist, it would take more than a month during the start of the tour. All of the shows in April are unique as the band are undergoing an experimental period, before finally achieving an optimal setlist outline by May. The band would still continue to experiment throughout the year. Most songs from the Hot Space album would be played on this tour, with "Action This Day" and "Under Pressure" being performed at every single show. Since the album itself was released on 21 May (the first night in Munich), fans at shows from the start of the tour until then would have been unfamiliar with the songs "Staying Power", "Back Chat" and "Action This Day". "Body Language" was introduced to the show briefly in May, before making a permanent return in July, and "Calling All Girls" would be introduced in July as well. "Life Is Real" would be heard at only a few concerts in August, and "Put Out The Fire" would be briefly introduced to the show in August, before permanently returning in September. "The Hero", "Sheer Heart Attack" and most of the fast version of "We Will Rock You" were dropped from July onwards, although the former would appear on the Japanese leg, and the latter would be re-introduced in September. Sheer Heart Attack would appear at least once on the North American leg of the tour, with Liar rumoured to have a performance in August.

Queen toured Europe, North America, and Japan throughout 1982. Several alterations were made to the touring schedule. The first being the cancellation of a planned concert at the Royal Albert Hall in London, due to the venue not being able to cope with the weight of the band's light rig. The second were two rescheduled concerts in England. The concert in Leeds was originally scheduled to take place at Old Trafford in Manchester and the Milton Keynes concert was supposed to take place at Arsenal Stadium in London. The concerts were moved due to potential noise complaints from local residents.

A small poster promoting the American leg of the tour

A DVD documenting the band's 5 June 1982 concert at the National Bowl in Milton Keynes was released in 2004 as Queen on Fire – Live at the Bowl. The DVD Extras contained video clips and audio clips recorded in Austria and Japan. The Japanese clips were recorded in Tokorozawa on the 3rd of November, 1982. They were released in Japan in 1983 simply as "Queen: Live in Japan", although the footage was trimmed down to 60 minutes.

The Hot Space Tour marked Queen's last concerts in North America to feature Freddie Mercury and John Deacon. Brian May and Roger Taylor returned to perform in the United States, along with Paul Rodgers, on the Queen + Paul Rodgers Tour.

Queen dropped several popular songs on stage after this tour, including the fast We Will Rock You, Action This Day, Play The Game, Put Out The Fire, Save Me, Get Down Make Love, Calling All Girls, Fat Bottomed Girls, Body Language and Teo Torriatte. After this tour, Queen would take a nearly two-year long break from touring, where they recorded "The Works". During this downtime, Brian May worked on the "Star Fleet Project" with various other artists, Roger Taylor worked on his solo album "Strange Frontier", and Freddie Mercury would work on his debut solo album "Mr. Bad Guy", which would feature the touring keyboardist Fred Mandel. He would be succeeded by Spike Edney on The Works Tour.

== Tour dates ==
| Date | City | Country | Venue |
Europe
| 9 April 1982 | Gothenburg | Sweden | Scandinavium |
| 10 April 1982 | Stockholm | Sweden | Johanneshovs Isstadion |
| 12 April 1982 | Drammen | Norway | Drammenshallen |
| 16 April 1982 | Zürich | Switzerland | Hallenstadion |
| 17 April 1982 | Zürich | Switzerland | Hallenstadion |
| 19 April 1982 | Paris | France | Palais des Sports |
| 20 April 1982 | Lyon | France | Palais des Sports de Gerland |
| 22 April 1982 | Brussels | Belgium | Forest National |
| 23 April 1982 | Brussels | Belgium | Forest National |
| 24 April 1982 | Leiden | Netherlands | Groenoordhallen |
| 25 April 1982 | Leiden | Netherlands | Groenoordhallen |
| 28 April 1982 | Frankfurt | West Germany | Festhalle Frankfurt |
| 1 May 1982 | Dortmund | West Germany | Westfalenhallen |
| 3 May 1982 | Paris | France | Palais des Sports |
| 5 May 1982 | Hanover | West Germany | Eilenriedehalle |
| 6 May 1982 | Cologne | West Germany | Cologne Sporthalle |
| 7 May 1982 | Cologne | West Germany | Cologne Sporthalle |
| 9 May 1982 | Würzburg | West Germany | Carl-Diem-Halle |
| 10 May 1982 | Böblingen | West Germany | Böblingen Sporthalle |
| 12 May 1982 | Vienna | Austria | Wiener Stadthalle |
| 13 May 1982 | Vienna | Austria | Wiener Stadthalle |
| 15 May 1982 | West Berlin | West Germany | Waldbühne |
| 16 May 1982 | Hamburg | West Germany | Ernst-Merck-Halle |
| 18 May 1982 | Kassel | West Germany | Eissporthalle Kassel |
| 21 May 1982 | Munich | West Germany | Olympiahalle |
| 22 May 1982 | Munich | West Germany | Olympiahalle |
| 29 May 1982 | Leeds | England | Elland Road |
| 1 June 1982 | Edinburgh | Scotland | Royal Highland Showground |
| 2 June 1982 | Edinburgh | Scotland | Royal Highland Showground |
| 5 June 1982 | Milton Keynes | England | Milton Keynes Bowl |
North America
| 21 July 1982 | Montreal | Canada | Montreal Forum |
| 23 July 1982 | Boston | United States | Boston Garden |
| 24 July 1982 | Philadelphia | United States | Spectrum |
| 25 July 1982 | Landover | United States | Capital Centre |
| 27 July 1982 | New York City | United States | Madison Square Garden |
| 28 July 1982 | New York City | United States | Madison Square Garden |
| 31 July 1982 | Richfield | United States | Richfield Coliseum |
| 2 August 1982 | Toronto | Canada | Maple Leaf Gardens |
| 3 August 1982 | Toronto | Canada | Maple Leaf Gardens |
| 5 August 1982 | Indianapolis | United States | Market Square Arena |
| 6 August 1982 | Detroit | United States | Joe Louis Arena |
| 7 August 1982 | Cincinnati | United States | Riverfront Coliseum |
| 9 August 1982 | East Rutherford | United States | Brendan Byrne Arena |
| 10 August 1982 | New Haven | United States | New Haven Coliseum |
| 13 August 1982 | Hoffman Estates | United States | Poplar Creek Music Theater |
| 14 August 1982 | Hoffman Estates | United States | Poplar Creek Music Theater |
| 15 August 1982 | Saint Paul | United States | St. Paul Civic Center |
| 19 August 1982 | Biloxi | United States | Mississippi Coast Coliseum |
| 20 August 1982 | Houston | United States | The Summit |
| 21 August 1982 | Dallas | United States | Reunion Arena |
| 24 August 1982 | Atlanta | United States | Omni Coliseum |
| 27 August 1982 | Oklahoma City | United States | Myriad Convention Center |
| 28 August 1982 | Kansas City | United States | Kemper Arena |
| 30 August 1982 | Denver | United States | McNichols Sports Arena |
| 2 September 1982 | Portland | United States | Memorial Coliseum |
| 3 September 1982 | Seattle | United States | Seattle Center Coliseum |
| 4 September 1982 | Vancouver | Canada | Pacific Coliseum |
| 7 September 1982 | Oakland | United States | Oakland Coliseum Arena |
| 10 September 1982 | Phoenix | United States | Arizona Veterans Memorial Coliseum |
| 11 September 1982 | Irvine | United States | Irvine Meadows Amphitheatre |
| 12 September 1982 | Irvine | United States | Irvine Meadows Amphitheatre |
| 14 September 1982 | Inglewood | United States | The Forum |
| 15 September 1982 | Inglewood | United States | The Forum |
Asia
| 19 October 1982 | Fukuoka | Japan | Fukuoka Kyuden Kinen Gymnasium |
| 20 October 1982 | Fukuoka | Japan | Fukuoka Kyuden Kinen Gymnasium |
| 24 October 1982 | Nishinomiya | Japan | Hankyu Nishinomiya Stadium |
| 26 October 1982 | Nagoya | Japan | Portmesse Nagoya |
| 29 October 1982 | Sapporo | Japan | Tsukisamu Green Dome |
| 3 November 1982 | Tokorozawa | Japan | Seibu Lions Stadium |

=== Box office score data ===
List of box office score data with date, city, venue, attendance, gross, references
| Date (1982) | City | Venue | Attendance | Gross | Ref(s) |
|---|---|---|---|---|---|
| 23 July | Boston, United States | Boston Garden | 15,500 / 15,500 | $188,898 | |
| 2 August | Toronto, Canada | Maple Leaf Gardens | 24,824 / 30,000 | $324,663 | |
| 3 August | Toronto, Canada | Maple Leaf Gardens | 24,824 / 30,000 | $324,663 | |
| 6 August | Detroit, United States | Joe Louis Arena | 18,024 / 19,950 | $211,505 | |
| 10 August | New Haven, United States | New Haven Coliseum | 10,275 / 10,275 | $117,282 | |
| 15 August | Saint Paul, United States | St. Paul Civic Center | 14,800 / 18,000 | $183,174 | |
| 20 August | Houston, United States | The Summit | 13,453 / 17,048 | $157,075 | |
| 21 August | Dallas, United States | Reunion Arena | 11,760 / 19,012 | $149,100 | |
| 27 August | Oklahoma City, United States | Myriad Convention Center | 10,772 / 11,000 | $128,929 | |
| 28 August | Kansas City, United States | Kemper Arena | 10,285 / 12,556 | $112,252 | |
| 30 August | Denver, United States | McNichols Sports Arena | 10,264 / 18,000 | $131,843 | |
| 2 September | Portland, United States | Memorial Coliseum | 6,832 / 12,110 | $81,438 | |
| 3 September | Seattle, United States | Seattle Center Coliseum | 9,930 / 12,000 | $113,928 | |
| 4 September | Vancouver, Canada | Pacific Coliseum | 10,264 / 16,696 | $140,064 | |
| 7 September | Oakland, United States | Oakland Coliseum Arena | 10,969 / 14,500 | $133,066 | |
| 10 September | Phoenix, United States | Arizona Veterans Memorial Coliseum | 13,328 / 15,000 | $157,404 | |
| 14 September | Inglewood, United States | The Forum | 20,502 / 27,262 | $274,703 | |
| 15 September | Inglewood, United States | The Forum | 20,502 / 27,262 | $274,703 | |
| TOTAL | | | 211,782 / 268,909 (79%) | $2,605,324 | |

== Personnel ==
Queen

- Freddie Mercury – lead vocals, piano, acoustic guitar (on "Crazy Little Thing Called Love")
- Brian May – electric guitar, acoustic guitar, backing vocals, piano
- Roger Taylor – drums, backing vocals
- John Deacon – bass guitar, additional vocals, electric guitar (on "Staying Power")

Additional musicians

- Morgan Fisher – keyboards, piano (Europe)
- Fred Mandel – keyboards, piano (North America and Japan)
