= Greatest Video Hits 2 =

- Produced by: Simon Lupton and Rhys Thomas
- Starring: Freddie Mercury; Brian May; Roger Taylor; John Deacon
- Music by: Queen
- Release date: November 2003
- Country: United Kingdom
- Language: English

Greatest Video Hits 2 is the second DVD of music videos from the British rock band, Queen. It was released in November 2003, and included video hits of the band from 1981 to 1989. It was at number one in UK, in its first week. It also peaked at number 1 in Ireland. In that same year the DVD was number 2 in Spain, and number 4 in Italy. It was certified 2 platinum awards in UK, platinum in France and Australia, gold in Germany, Spain, Poland and other countries.

It features an option for audio commentary from both Brian May and Roger Taylor on each music video, reflecting on their memories and opinions of each video.

Music videos from Innuendo were not included on the DVD.

== Disc one ==
1. A Kind of Magic (from A Kind of Magic, 1986)
2. I Want It All (from The Miracle, 1989)
3. Radio Ga Ga (from The Works, 1984)
4. I Want to Break Free (from The Works, 1984)
5. Breakthru (from The Miracle, 1989)
6. Under Pressure (from Hot Space, 1982)
7. Scandal (from The Miracle, 1989)
8. Who Wants to Live Forever (from A Kind of Magic, 1986)
9. The Miracle (from The Miracle, 1989)
10. It's a Hard Life (from The Works, 1984)
11. The Invisible Man (from The Miracle, 1989)
12. Las Palabras de Amor (from Hot Space, 1982)
13. Friends Will Be Friends (from A Kind of Magic, 1986)
14. Body Language (from Hot Space, 1982)
15. Hammer to Fall (from The Works, 1984)
16. Princes of the Universe (from A Kind of Magic, 1986)
17. One Vision (from A Kind of Magic, 1986)

== Disc two ==
=== Hot Space section Volume 1 ===
- Back Chat
- Calling All Girls
- Staying Power; live from Milton Keynes, 1982

Also there is an alternative version of "Who Wants To Live Forever". On the Hot Space menu, highlight the play all button and then press up, left, and right to see the Ian and Belinda version of the song for the British Bone Marrow Donor Appeal.

=== The Works section Volume 2 ===
- Montreux Golden Rose Pop Festival
- Interviews, including one with Freddie Mercury.

=== A Kind of Magic section Volume 3 ===
- Montreux Golden Rose Pop Festival
- Interviews
- One Vision documentary
- 'Extended Vision' video

=== The Miracle section Volume 4 ===
- Interviews
- 'Making of The Miracle' documentary
- 'Making of The Miracle Album Cover' documentary
- Bonus video: Who Wants to Live Forever for the Bone Marrow Donor Appeal

== Audio ==
- PCM Stereo
- DTS 5.1 (for Disc 1 only and those marked with an asterisk on Disc 2)
- Commentary from Roger Taylor and Brian May on each Music Video.
- UK copies have a few seconds of introduction by Jonathan Ross dubbed at the end of Miracle Interviews by accident.

== Charts and certifications ==
=== Charts ===
Chart (2003)	Peak position
German Albums Chart	69

Chart (2005)	Peak position
Hungarian Top 20 DVDs	16

=== Certifications ===
Region	Certification	Certified units/sales
Argentina (CAPIF)	Platinum	8,000^{^}
Australia (ARIA)	Platinum	15,000^{^}
France (SNEP)	Platinum	20,000^{*}
Germany (BVMI)	Platinum	50,000^{^}
Mexico (AMPROFON)	Gold	10,000^{^}
Poland (ZPAV)	Gold	5,000^{*}
United Kingdom (BPI)	3× Platinum	150,000^{*}
^{*} Sales figures based on certification alone.^{^} Shipments figures based on certification alone.
