= Absolute Greatest =

Greatest hits album by Queen
- Released: 11 November 2009
- Recorded: 1973–1995
- Genre: Rock
- Length: 79:28
- Label: Parlophone; Hollywood
- Producer: various

Queen chronology
The Singles Collection Volume 2 (2009)	Absolute Greatest (2009)	The Singles Collection Volume 3 (2010)

Professional ratings
Review scores
Source	Rating
AllMusic	4/5 stars
Classic Rock	7/10 stars
Q	4/5 stars
The Rolling Stone Album Guide	4/5 stars

Absolute Greatest is a 2009 compilation album by the British rock band Queen. The album contains 20 of their most famous songs, and is available in several formats, including the single CD edition, a 2 CD special edition featuring audio commentaries by Brian May and Roger Taylor, a 52-page hardback book with the 2 CDs, digital download, and an LP edition box set. Each track has been remastered from the original tapes.

A promotion running on the band's official website, Queen Online, gave fans the opportunity to guess the placings of the tracks on the album and win a prize if their answer was correct (a new track was revealed daily). The prize winner was then chosen in a random selection.

== Track listing ==
Side one
No.	Title	Writer(s)	Length
1.	"We Will Rock You" (from News of the World, 1977)	Brian May	2:02
2.	"We Are the Champions" (from News of the World, 1977)	Freddie Mercury	3:01
3.	"Radio Ga Ga" (from The Works, 1984)	Roger Taylor	5:48
4.	"Another One Bites the Dust" (from The Game, 1980)	John Deacon	3:35

Side two
No.	Title	Writer(s)	Length
5.	"I Want It All" (single version, from The Miracle, 1989)	Queen (May)	4:01
6.	"Crazy Little Thing Called Love" (from The Game, 1980)	Mercury	2:44
7.	"A Kind of Magic" (from A Kind of Magic, 1986)	Taylor	4:25

Side three
No.	Title	Writer(s)	Length
8.	"Under Pressure" (with David Bowie, from Hot Space, 1982)	Queen, Bowie	4:08
9.	"One Vision" (single version, from A Kind of Magic, 1986)	Queen (Taylor)	4:04
10.	"You're My Best Friend" (from, A Night at the Opera, 1975)	Deacon	2:51
11.	"Don't Stop Me Now" (from Jazz, 1978)	Mercury	3:30

Side four
No.	Title	Writer(s)	Length
12.	"Killer Queen" (from Sheer Heart Attack, 1974)	Mercury	3:00
13.	"These Are the Days of Our Lives" (from Innuendo, 1991)	Queen (Taylor)	4:13
14.	"Who Wants to Live Forever" (Greatest Hits II edit, from A Kind of Magic, 1986)	May	4:55

Side five
No.	Title	Writer(s)	Length
15.	"Seven Seas of Rhye" (from Queen II, 1974)	Mercury	2:46
16.	"Heaven for Everyone" (single version, from Made in Heaven, 1995)	Taylor	4:43
17.	"Somebody to Love" (from A Day at the Races, 1976)	Mercury	4:55

Side six
No.	Title	Writer(s)	Length
18.	"I Want to Break Free" (single version, from The Works, 1984)	Deacon	4:19
19.	"The Show Must Go On" (from Innuendo, 1991)	Queen (May)	4:32
20.	"Bohemian Rhapsody" (from A Night at the Opera, 1975)	Mercury	5:56

== Personnel ==
- Freddie Mercury - lead and backing vocals, piano, guitar, keyboards, synthesiser
- Brian May - guitar, backing vocals, keyboards, synthesiser, orchestral arrangements on "Who Wants to Live Forever", co-lead vocals on "I Want It All" and "Who Wants to Live Forever"
- Roger Taylor - drums, percussion, keyboards, synthesiser, electronic drums, backing vocals
- John Deacon - bass guitar, piano, guitar, keyboards, synthesiser
- David Bowie - vocals, hand claps, finger snaps, keyboards on "Under Pressure"
- Fred Mandel - synthesiser on "Radio Ga Ga" and "I Want To Break Free"
- National Philharmonic Orchestra - strings on "Who Wants To Live Forever"
- Michael Kamen - conductor and orchestral arrangements on "Who Wants To Live Forever"

== Charts and certifications ==
=== Weekly charts ===
Chart (2009)	Peak position
Australian Albums (ARIA)	18
Austrian Albums (Ö3 Austria)	10
Belgian Albums (Ultratop Wallonia)	22
Danish Albums (Hitlisten)	6
French Compilations Albuns (SNEP)	11
German Albums (Offizielle Top 100)	23
Hungarian Albums (MAHASZ)	4
Irish Albums (IRMA)	9
Italian Albums (FIMI)	21
Mexican Albums (Top 100 Mexico)	22
Norwegian Albums (VG-lista)	6
Portuguese Albums (AFP)	4
Scottish Albums (OCC)	3
Spanish Albums (PROMUSICAE)	20
Swedish Albums (Sverigetopplistan)	5
Swiss Albums (Schweizer Hitparade)	15
UK Albums (OCC)	3

Chart (2010)	Peak position
Belgian Albums (Ultratop Flanders)	15
Dutch Albums (Album Top 100)	36
New Zealand Albums (RMNZ)	6

Chart (2011)	Peak position
Finnish Albums (Suomen virallinen lista)	15

Chart (2018)	Peak position
Canadian Albums (Billboard)	10

=== Year-end charts ===
Chart (2009)	Position
New Zealand Albums (RMNZ)	35
Swedish Albums (Sverigetopplistan)	34
UK Albums (OCC)	17

Chart (2010)	Position
Belgian Albums (Ultratop Flanders)	63
Belgian Albums (Ultratop Wallonia)	66
New Zealand Albums (RMNZ)	43
Swedish Albums (Sverigetopplistan)	68
UK Albums (OCC)	107

== Certifications ==
Region	Certification	Certified units/sales
Australia (ARIA)	Gold	35,000^{^}
Denmark (IFPI Danmark)	Gold	15,000^{^}
Hungary (MAHASZ)	Platinum	6,000^{^}
Ireland (IRMA)	Platinum	15,000^{^}
Italy (FIMI)	Gold	35,000^{*}
New Zealand (RMNZ)	Platinum	15,000^{^}
Poland (ZPAV)	Gold	10,000^{*}
Portugal (AFP)	Gold	10,000^{^}
United Kingdom (BPI)	2× Platinum	600,000^{^}
^{*} Sales figures based on certification alone.^{^} Shipments figures based on certification alone.
