= The Singles Collection Volume 1 =

Box set by Queen
- Released: 17 November 2008
- Recorded: 1972–1978
- Genre: Rock
- Length: 1:39:05
- Label: Parlophone/EMI
- Producers: John Anthony; Roy Thomas Baker; Queen; Robin Geoffrey Cable; Mike Stone

Queen chronology
Queen Rock Montreal (2007)	The Singles Collection Volume 1 (2008)	The Singles Collection Volume 2 (2009)

The Singles Collection, Volume 1 is a limited edition CD series compilation box set by the British rock band Queen, released in 2008. The box set contains remastered versions of the first 13 worldwide top-40 charting singles released by Queen, including b-sides.

== Track listing ==
Disc one

1. "Keep Yourself Alive" – 3:46
2. "Son and Daughter" – 3:19

Disc two

1. "Seven Seas of Rhye" – 2:47
2. "See What a Fool I've Been" – 4:29

Disc three

1. "Killer Queen" – 3:00
2. "Flick of the Wrist" – 3:19

Disc four

1. "Now I'm Here" – 4:12
2. "Lily of the Valley" – 1:40

Disc five

1. "Bohemian Rhapsody" – 5:55
2. "I'm in Love with My Car" – 3:12

Disc six

1. "You're My Best Friend" – 2:52
2. "'39" – 3:30

Disc seven

1. "Somebody to Love" – 4:56
2. "White Man" – 4:59

Disc eight

1. "Tie Your Mother Down" – 3:45
2. "You and I" – 3:25

Disc nine (Queen's First E.P.)

1. "Good Old-Fashioned Lover Boy" – 2:53
2. "Death on Two Legs (Dedicated To...)" – 3:43
3. "Tenement Funster" – 3:00
4. "White Queen (As It Began)" – 4:34

Disc ten

1. "We Are the Champions" – 3:04
2. "We Will Rock You" – 2:02

Disc eleven

1. "Spread Your Wings" – 4:35
2. "Sheer Heart Attack" – 3:25

Disc twelve

1. "Bicycle Race" – 3:02
2. "Fat Bottomed Girls" – 3:23

Disc thirteen

1. "Don't Stop Me Now" – 3:31
2. "In Only Seven Days" – 2:31
