= Stone Cold Classics =

Compilation album by Queen
- Released: 11 April 2006
- Genre: Rock
- Length: 59:05
- Label: Hollywood

Queen chronology
Queen on Fire – Live at the Bowl (2004)	Stone Cold Classics (2006)	The A–Z of Queen, Volume 1 (2007)

Stone Cold Classics is a compilation album by British rock band Queen released on 11 April 2006, in conjunction with the broadcast of an episode of the U.S. television series American Idol, in which contestants performed songs from the Queen catalogue.

== Track listing ==
1. "Stone Cold Crazy" (Deacon, May, Mercury, Taylor) – 2:15
2. "Tie Your Mother Down" (May) – 3:46
3. "Fat Bottomed Girls" (May) – 3:24
4. "Another One Bites the Dust" (Deacon) – 3:36
5. "Crazy Little Thing Called Love" (Mercury) – 2:44
6. "We Will Rock You" (May) – 2:02
7. "We Are the Champions" (Mercury) – 3:01
8. "Radio Ga Ga" (Taylor) – 5:49
9. "Bohemian Rhapsody" (Mercury) – 5:55
10. "The Show Must Go On" (Queen (May)) – 4:33
11. "These Are the Days of Our Lives" (Queen (Taylor)) – 4:14
12. "I Want It All" (Queen (May)) – 4:31
13. "All Right Now" – performed live by Queen + Paul Rodgers – 6:55
14. "Feel Like Makin' Love" – performed live by Queen + Paul Rodgers – 6:20

== Chart performance ==
Chart (2006)	Peak position
US Billboard 200	45
US Top Rock Albums (Billboard)	8
