= Greatest Video Hits 1 =

- Produced by: Simon Lupton and Rhys Thomas
- Starring: Freddie Mercury; Brian May; Roger Taylor; John Deacon
- Music by: Queen
- Distributed by: EMI (Europe); Hollywood Records (North America)
- Release date: October 14, 2002
- Running time: 200 minutes
- Country: United Kingdom
- Language: English

Greatest Video Hits 1 was the first Queen video collection on DVD. Most of the content was released previously on VHS and the long defunct CED Videodisc format as Greatest Flix in 1981. It was released in October 2002, and included video hits of the band between 1973 and 1981.

The DVD peaked at number one in UK, with sales of more than 90,000 copies. It was also the best selling DVD of the year in 2002. It was also number one in USA (Platinum), Germany (Gold), Spain and other countries. Sales were certified quadruple Platinum in Australia, triple Platinum in Canada, and Platinum in Poland.

Most music videos on the DVD have been converted to 16:9 widescreen. This was achieved by cropping the top and bottom of the original 4:3 frame. This caused some controversy within Queen's fanbase. It was followed by Queen’s Greatest Video Hits 2 DVD release.

== Disc 1 ==
1. Bohemian Rhapsody (from A Night at the Opera, 1975)
2. Another One Bites the Dust (from The Game, 1980)
3. Killer Queen (live Top of the Pops version) (from Sheer Heart Attack, 1974)
4. Fat Bottomed Girls (from Jazz, 1978)
5. Bicycle Race (from Jazz, 1978)
6. You're My Best Friend (from A Night at the Opera, 1975)
7. Don't Stop Me Now (from Jazz, 1978)
8. Save Me (from The Game, 1980)
9. Crazy Little Thing Called Love (from The Game, 1980)
10. Somebody to Love (from A Day at the Races, 1976)
11. Spread Your Wings (from News of the World, 1977)
12. Play the Game (from The Game, 1980)
13. Flash (from Flash Gordon, 1980)
14. Tie Your Mother Down (from A Day at the Races, 1976)
15. We Will Rock You (from News of the World, 1977)
16. We Are the Champions (from News of the World, 1977)

Audio (optional):

- PCM Stereo
- DTS 5.1
- Audio commentary by Queen

== Disc 2 ==
1. "Now I'm Here" (Live in 1974 in London on Sheer Heart Attack Tour) (from Sheer Heart Attack, 1974)
2. "Good Old-Fashioned Lover Boy" (Live in July 1977 on Top of the Pops) (from A Day at the Races, 1976)
3. "Keep Yourself Alive" (from Queen, 1973)
4. "Liar" (from Queen, 1973)
5. "Love of My Life" (Live in 1979 on the Jazz Tour) (from A Night at the Opera, 1975)
6. "We Will Rock You (Fast)" (Fast Version; Live in Houston in 1977 on the News of the World Tour) (from News of the World, 1977)

The second disc also contains some extras, such as a documentary about "Bohemian Rhapsody" called "Inside the Rhapsody" and a photo gallery. A Flames version of "Bohemian Rhapsody" is available. Audio commentaries by Freddie Mercury and John Deacon are taken from previously recorded interviews whilst Brian May and Roger Taylor have recorded new commentaries for the DVD. Both confessed they have few memories of many of the videos because they did not see them for a long time prior to the commentary being recorded.

== Charts and certifications ==
=== Charts ===
Chart (2002)	Peak position
German Albums Chart	42

Chart (2005)	Peak position
Hungarian Top 20 DVDs	8

=== Certifications ===
Region	Certification	Certified units/sales
Argentina (CAPIF)	Platinum	8,000^{^}
Australia (ARIA)	6× Platinum	90,000^{^}
Canada (Music Canada)	3× Platinum	30,000^{^}
France (SNEP)	Gold	10,000^{*}
Germany (BVMI)	3× Gold	75,000^{^}
Mexico (AMPROFON)	Gold	10,000^{^}
Poland (ZPAV)	Platinum	10,000^{*}
United Kingdom (BPI)	3× Platinum	150,000^{*}
United States (RIAA)	Platinum	50,000^{^}
^{*} Sales figures based on certification alone.^{^} Shipments figures based on certification alone.
