= Queen on Fire – Live at the Bowl =

Live album by Queen
- Released: 25 October 2004 (Europe); 9 November 2004 (US)
- Recorded: 5 June 1982; 2004 (pitch-corrections)
- Venues: Milton Keynes Bowl, Milton Keynes, England
- Genre: Rock
- Length: 101:58
- Labels: EMI/Parlophone (Europe); Hollywood (US)
- Producers: Brian May; Roger Taylor; Justin Shirley-Smith

Queen chronology
The Platinum Collection (2000)	Queen on Fire – Live at the Bowl (2004)	Stone Cold Classics (2006)

Queen on Fire – Live at the Bowl
- Directed by: Gavin Taylor
- Produced by: Jeff Brown; Malcolm Gerrie; Simon Lupton; Brian May; Roger Taylor; Rhys Thomas; Andrea Wonfor
- Starring: Freddie Mercury; Brian May; Roger Taylor; John Deacon; Morgan Fisher; Fred Mandel
- Release date: 2004
- Running time: 170 minutes
- Country: United Kingdom

Professional ratings
Review scores
Source	Rating
BBC	(Positive)
Allmusic	3/5 stars

Queen on Fire – Live at the Bowl is a DVD/live album by the British rock band Queen released on 25 October 2004 in Europe and on 9 November 2004 in the US. It was recorded live at the Milton Keynes Bowl, Buckinghamshire, England, on 5 June 1982 during the Hot Space Tour. A DVD was also released with the complete concert and bonus material, such as band interviews and tour highlights.

In 2005, the album was also released as an LP. In the UK, the DVD made No. 1 and CD, No. 20 in the DVD and CD chart respectively. In the US, neither the DVD nor album charted.

== Notes ==
During the concert, lead guitarist Brian May had a few minor problems with his homemade Red Special guitar. During both the fast version of "We Will Rock You" and "Dragon Attack", two of the strings broke and he had to change to his Birch Red Special backup for most of "Action This Day" and for the entire second half of "Dragon Attack" and the entire duration of "Now I'm Here (Reprise)".

Before playing "Love of My Life", May played a snippet of the intro to "Las Palabras de Amor" calling it "a little fiddle around".

During May's guitar solo, the pickup switches of his guitar were switched off and May's guitar solo stopped for 20 seconds (the full 20 seconds is on the DVD, but the album version of the performance contains only 3 seconds). His guitar tech, Brian Zellis, helped May to get his guitar going again by simply turning back on the switches.

Drummer Roger Taylor and bass guitarist John Deacon performed impromptu solos during "Dragon Attack" and before "Under Pressure", respectively when May switched guitars during "Dragon Attack" and was getting his guitar fixed following his solo.

During "Fat Bottomed Girls", Freddie Mercury's voice very briefly slipped into an off-key falsetto during the lyric "in this locality" (the original error could be heard on the original BBC TV, Channel 4, MTV, an audience recording, and radio broadcasts of the concert) but the error was fixed for the release of the DVD and CD.

During the first verse of "Fat Bottomed Girls", instead of singing the original line "you made a bad boy out of me", Mercury sang "you made an asshole out of me".

Mercury performed without his trademark bottomless microphone stand for "We Will Rock You (Fast)", "Now I'm Here" and "The Hero" (shown on the Live in Japan bonus footage on DVD). This allowed Mercury to more freely scale and walk along the raised wings on either side of the stage.

Throughout the concert a member of the crowd can be heard using an air horn. The "air horn man" is thanked in the album's liner notes.

Due to censorship laws the Hong Kong and China release of the CD removed "Get Down, Make Love" and "Fat Bottomed Girls".

== Track listing ==
=== Disc 1 ===
No.	Title	Writer(s)	Length
1.	"Flash"	Brian May	1:54
2.	"The Hero"	May	1:44
3.	"We Will Rock You" (fast)	May	3:17
4.	"Action This Day"	Roger Taylor	4:52
5.	"Play the Game"	Freddie Mercury	4:30
6.	"Staying Power"	Mercury	4:03
7.	"Somebody to Love"	Mercury	7:53
8.	"Now I'm Here"	May	6:18
9.	"Dragon Attack"	May	4:16
10.	"Now I'm Here" (reprise)	May	2:21
11.	"Love of My Life"	Mercury	4:22
12.	"Save Me"	May	4:00
13.	"Back Chat"	John Deacon	5:00
Total length:			54:24

=== Disc 2 ===
No.	Title	Writer(s)	Length
1.	"Get Down, Make Love" (not included on the China or Hong Kong release)	Mercury	3:39
2.	"Guitar Solo"	May	6:22
3.	"Under Pressure"	Taylor; Mercury; David Bowie; Deacon; May	3:47
4.	"Fat Bottomed Girls" (not included on the China or Hong Kong release)	May	5:25
5.	"Crazy Little Thing Called Love"	Mercury	4:15
6.	"Bohemian Rhapsody"	Mercury	5:38
7.	"Tie Your Mother Down"	May	4:09
8.	"Another One Bites the Dust"	Deacon	3:49
9.	"Sheer Heart Attack"	Taylor	3:25
10.	"We Will Rock You"	May	2:08
11.	"We Are the Champions"	Mercury	3:28
12.	"God Save the Queen"	Traditional; arranged by May	1:24
Total length:			47:29

== DVD bonus material ==
- MK Bowl backstage interview
- Freddie Mercury interview
- Brian May and Roger Taylor interviews
- Songs from concert at Stadthalle, Vienna, Austria on 12 May 1982
  1. "Another One Bites the Dust"
  2. "We Will Rock You"
  3. "We Are the Champions"
  4. "God Save the Queen"
- Songs from concert at Seibu Lions Stadium, Tokorozawa, Japan on 3 November 1982
  1. "Flash / The Hero"
  2. "Now I'm Here"
  3. "Impromptu"
  4. "Put Out the Fire"
  5. "Dragon Attack"
  6. "Now I'm Here (Reprise)"
  7. "Crazy Little Thing Called Love"
  8. "Teo Torriatte (Let Us Cling Together)"
- Photo gallery (Calling All Girls)

== Personnel ==
Queen

- Freddie Mercury – lead vocals, piano, acoustic rhythm guitar on "Crazy Little Thing Called Love"
- Brian May – harmony and backing vocals, guitars, piano on "Save Me"
- Roger Taylor – harmony and backing vocals, drums, percussion, co-lead vocals on "Action This Day" (verses) and "Sheer Heart Attack"
- John Deacon – bass guitar, rhythm guitar on "Staying Power", additional backing vocals on "Somebody to Love" and "Back Chat"

Additional musicians

- Morgan Fisher – keyboards, piano

Technical

- Justin Shirley-Smith – mix producer
- Kris Fredriksson – Pro Tools HD
- Reinhold Mack – recording engineer
- Mick McKenna – second recording engineer
- Tim Young – mastering
- Richard Gray – artwork
- Denis O'Regan – photography

== Charts and certifications ==
=== Charts ===
==== Album ====
Chart (2004)	Peak position
Austrian Top 75 Albums	23
Belgium (Flanders) 100 Albums	60
Belgium (Wallonia) 100 Albums	80
French Top 200 Albums	75
German Albums Chart	10
Irish Albums (IRMA)	67
Italian Top 20 Albums	15
Netherlands Top 100 Albums	74
Portuguese Top 30 Albums	9
Scottish Albums	22
Swiss Top 100 Albums	52
UK Albums Chart	20

Chart (2005)	Peak position
Spanish Top 100 Albums	73

==== DVD ====
Chart (2004)	Peak position
Australian Top 40 DVDs	10
Austrian Top 10 Music DVDs	1
Norwegian Top 10 DVDs	4
Swedish Top 20 DVDs	1

Chart (2005)	Peak position
Belgium (Wallonia) Top 10 Music DVDs	1
Hungarian Top 20 DVDs	5

=== Certifications ===
==== Album ====
Region	Certification	Certified units/sales
Austria (IFPI Austria)	Gold	15,000^{*}
Germany (BVMI)	Platinum	200,000^{^}
United Kingdom (BPI)	Gold	100,000^{^}
^{^} Shipments figures based on certification alone.

==== DVD ====
Region	Certification	Certified units/sales
Argentina (CAPIF)	Platinum	8,000^{^}
Australia (ARIA)	3× Platinum	45,000^{^}
Austria (IFPI Austria)	Gold	5,000^{*}
France (SNEP)	3× Platinum	60,000^{*}
Germany (BVMI)	5× Gold	125,000^{^}
Mexico (AMPROFON)	Gold	10,000^{^}
Portugal (AFP)	2× Platinum	16,000^{^}
Switzerland (IFPI Switzerland)	Gold	3,000^{^}
United Kingdom (BPI)	3× Platinum	150,000^{^}
United States (RIAA)	Platinum	100,000^{^}
^{*} Sales figures based on certification alone.^{^} Shipments figures based on certification alone.
