= Calling All Girls =

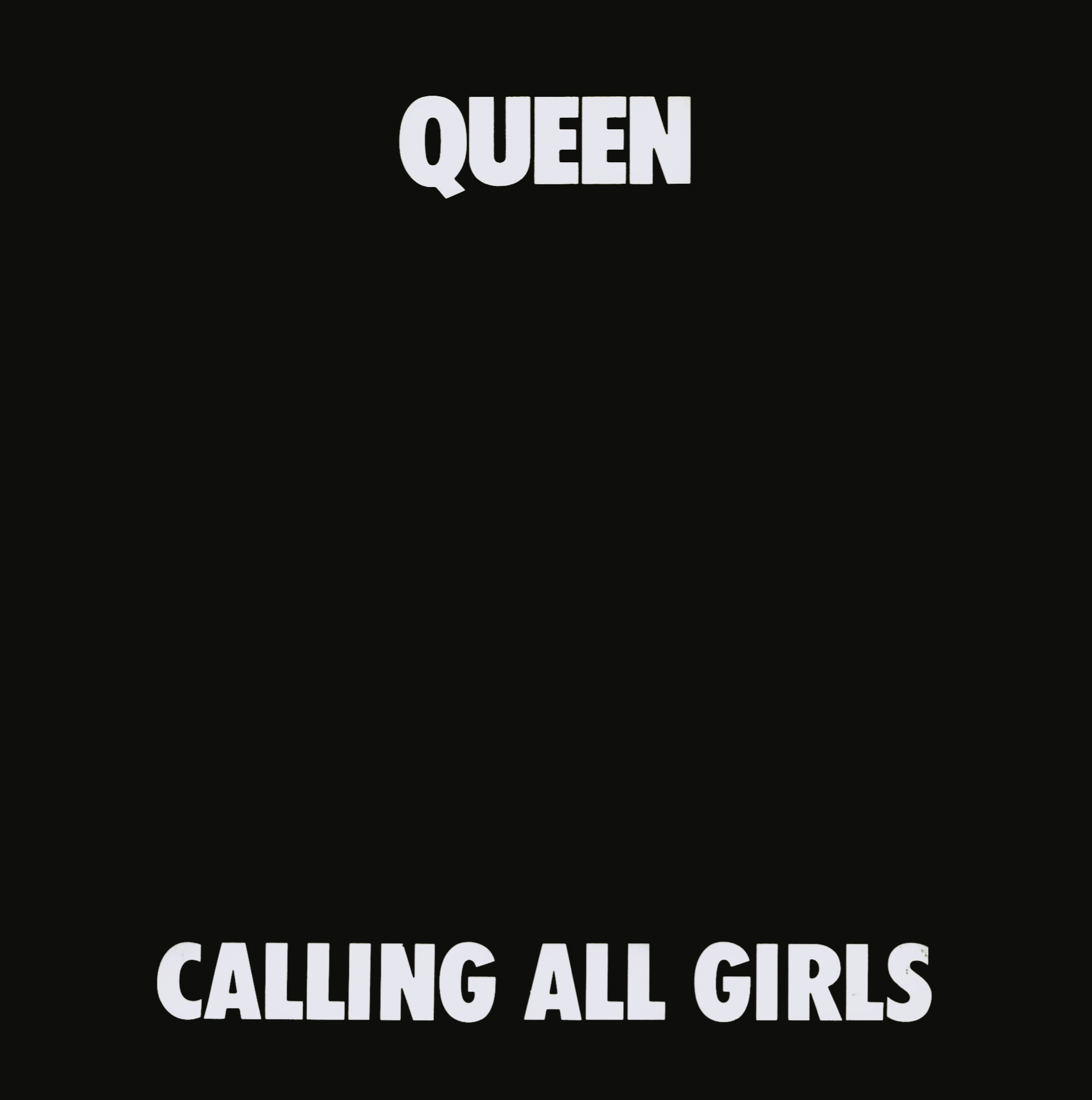
- US single picture sleeve

Single by Queen

from the album Hot Space
- B-side: "Put Out the Fire"
- Released: 19 July 1982
- Recorded: 1981–1982
- Genre: New wave
- Length: 3:50
- Label: Elektra
- Songwriter: Roger Taylor
- Producers: Queen; Reinhold Mack

Queen singles chronology
"Las Palabras de Amor" (1982)	"Calling All Girls" (1982)	"Staying Power" (1982)

Music video
- "Calling All Girls" on YouTube

"Calling All Girls" is a song by the British rock band Queen, from the album Hot Space. It was written by drummer Roger Taylor. It was the third US single from the album, released in the summer of 1982, where it peaked at number 60. It was also released in Canada (number 33), Australia and New Zealand.

This marked the first time a Roger Taylor–penned Queen song was released as a single. Taylor composed the song on guitar, playing feedback noises during the break. There is also the notable use of record-scratching. The song was never performed in Europe, but a 1982 concert recording in Japan is available on the Queen on Fire – Live at the Bowl DVD.

== Music video ==
The video is a parody of the George Lucas film THX 1138 featuring robots, and was rarely seen before being released on Greatest Video Hits 2 and the band's official YouTube page. Both Taylor and Brian May openly expressed disdain for the video in their commentary for it, with Taylor claiming the song's message had nothing to do with robots.

== Personnel ==
- Freddie Mercury – lead and backing vocals
- Brian May – electric guitar
- Roger Taylor – drums, percussion, acoustic guitar, backing vocals
- John Deacon – bass guitar

== Live recording ==
- Queen on Fire – Live at the Bowl (DVD)
- Hot Space (Bonus EP)

== Chart performance ==
Chart (1982)	Peak position
US Billboard Hot 100	60
US Mainstream Rock (Billboard)	40
