= Body Language (Queen song) =

- US variant of standard artwork

Single by Queen

from the album Hot Space
- B-side: "Life is Real (Song for Lennon)"
- Released: 19 April 1982
- Recorded: December 1981 – February 1982
- Genre: Funk; dance; new wave
- Length: 4:29
- Label: EMI (UK); Elektra (US)
- Songwriter: Freddie Mercury
- Producers: Queen; Reinhold Mack

Queen singles chronology
"Under Pressure" (1981)	"Body Language" (1982)	"Las Palabras de Amor" (1982)

Music video
- "Body Language" on YouTube

"Body Language" (printed as "Body Language ↑⬱") is a 1982 song by British rock band Queen. It was written by the band's lead singer Freddie Mercury and was a hit in North America, where it received extensive radio play. However, the single only received a lukewarm response in the United Kingdom. The track was the second single released from their 1982 album Hot Space. The music video for the song was the first one to be banned from MTV for its nudity, despite the members of Queen being fully clothed.

== History ==
The massive success of "Another One Bites the Dust" inspired Queen to temporarily abandon their glam roots in the early 1980s, and experiment with disco, funk and soul music. "Body Language" and its parent album Hot Space were the results of this change. "Body Language" is notable for its near lack of guitar; atmospheric guitar chords sparingly dot the body of the song, while a brief two-note riff is heard during the fade out. The song's key feature was its minimal, sparse production, with the emphasis of "suggestive" lyrics, a "slinky" synth bass (played on an Oberheim OB-X), and writer Freddie Mercury's moans and groans. This song was played twice during the European leg of the Hot Space Tour, with the first performance being in Vienna on 13 May. The song was played every night on the U.S leg and the Japanese leg, where the song achieved more commercial success. It often got a lukewarm reaction, although the live arrangement was very different from the studio one.

The full title of the song, as printed both on the single and Hot Space album sleeve, is "Body Language ↑⬱". The usage and pronunciation of the arrows was never explained by any member of Queen, though the arrows did show up as part of the single's cover art and in its video, where they were painted on the bodies of models, while Freddie Mercury also wore shirts and a white leather jacket during the album's ensuing tour that had similar arrow designs.

The song features a distinctive rhythmic synth bass line as primary sound played by Mercury, making it one of the few band songs not to feature bassist John Deacon on the recording. Brian May only briefly participates on guitar towards the end of the song, being one of his least significant contributions to a Queen single.

May disliked the song, for its near-total lack of guitars and homoeroticism, believing that Queen's music should be for all audiences rather than one specific audience. "I can remember having a go at Freddie because some of the stuff he was writing was very on the gay side. I remember saying, 'It would be nice if this stuff could be universally applicable because we have friends out there of every persuasion.' It's nice to involve people. What it's not nice to do is to rope people out, and I felt kind of roped out by something that was very overtly a gay anthem." May also cited the song as one of several on Hot Space which "came out too light ... we were afraid to turn up the guitars. Afraid to use the guitar as a force." Oddly, Freddie wrote this song for a young girl he fancied who performed in the video and later became champion U. S. based woman wrestler Brittany Brown.

== Reaction ==
The drastic change caused the single to stall at #25 on the UK charts. However, it did far better in the US, where Americans appeared to be a lot more supportive of Queen's forays into dance music. "Body Language" peaked at #11 on the Billboard Hot 100 and #30 on the soul chart. While noting that the song was released in most markets due to it being the album's lead single, Brian May thought "Body Language" would be a big hit in the UK and not in the US, and was surprised when it turned out to be a big US hit and not a big UK hit, saying: "You can never, ever tell". The B-side is "Life Is Real (Song for Lennon)", this single was released just a little over a year after the assassination of the former Beatle.

In the US, the accompanying music video caused a considerable amount of controversy. Due to its erotic undertones plus plentiful skin and sweat, it was deemed unsuitable for a television audience in 1982.

=== Critical reception ===
The single received mixed to negative reviews. In a contemporary review, Billboard named it a "Top Singles Pick" and believed the song's synth bass, percussion and Mercury's "rap inflections" are aimed at the dance and urban contemporary radio that helped make "Another One Bites the Dust" a big hit, but that the song's choral harmonies "will lure pop and AOR." As guest singles review for Smash Hits, Martin Fry of ABC described the song as a "non-erotic cabaret" that showcases Queen "[doing] their damnedest to supply a near-nude backing track" to Mercury's sexualised vocals. Though he believed Imagination "do it 100 times better with sex appeal", he predicted the single would be a huge hit. Sandy Robertson of Sounds grouped "Dancer" and "Body Language" among the "harder funk cuts" on side one of Hot Space. In his Rolling Stone review of the album, critic John Milward dismissed "Body Language" as "a piece of funk that isn't fun".

Retrospectively, Anthony Miccio of Stylus Magazine commented on its unlikely success, saying it made the US Top 20 "despite consisting merely of a loping shuffle, some spacey keyboards and Freddie screaming 'GIVE ME YOUR BODY! SEXY BOD-AY!'." Miccio considers the song to be "lots of fun", praising the unusual firecracker sound effects, but believes it "lacks the weight" of the first three Hot Space songs. Colin Irwin Ultimate Classic Rock felt the song was jarring for its arrangement, almost lacking guitars, and its unapologetically sexual lyrics, naming it "arguably their raunchiest song", one that sees Queen venture "down the disco rabbit hole" Irwin also names it "one of the most divisive hits in their vaunted catalog".

Rich Wilhelm of PopMatters reflected that, as the fourth song on Hot Space, the "notorious" song remains polarising, especially to diehard Queen fans, and dashed the hopes of rock fans who "[held] on to some shred of hope" during the opening three songs, given that (like "Staying Power"), the bass-driven song about a sexy body is "devoid of anything old school Queen fans could hold onto and potentially cherish." Wilhelm called it a curious choice of lead single, but noted its success on various American Billboard charts, adding: "Being based primarily on a looping bass line, 'Body Language' was an easy song for anyone with a record player and a cassette tape deck to remix."

In 2023, Stephen Thomas Erlewine of The A.V. Club ranked it as Queen's 32nd best song, writing that its "hazy new wave funk" is startling for a band that once eschewed synthesisers, as it shows the band "embracing everything they never were". Erlewine says the song "indeed makes no concessions to a rock audience but that's the compelling thing about it: it's loose and weird in a way that Queen rarely was." Dave Simpson of The Guardian named it Queen's fourth worst single in 2018, writing: "Loathed by Queen's more rockist fans, which at least is one positive for a song that mostly consists of Freddie Mercury trying to lift a limp electro groove by moaning: 'Give me! Your bod-ayyy!'" Chris Chantler of Louder Sound named it their fifth worst song in 2016, calling it an "absurdly basic single" that epitomised Mercury's "Berlin nightclub period", describing it as "a repetitive bass line over a lifeless electronic shuffle, with Freddie groaning and screaming about shagging. Brian gets virtually nothing to do".

== Popular culture references ==
- "Body Language" was danced to in solo performances by both Blake McGrath and Jessica Fernandez on So You Think You Can Dance. "Body Language" was danced to in the Top 12 performances as a Jazz routine by Pasha Kovalev and Sara Von Gillern on So You Think You Can Dance (Season 3). It was also danced to in Season 12's Top 10 Stage dance.
- "Body Language" can be briefly heard in the 1984 documentary film Stripper, being performed to by dancer Sara Costa.
- The song was featured in an episode of Nip/Tuck.
- The Foo Fighters used "Body Language" in a video promoting the tour for Wasting Light, called "Hot Buns". Dave Grohl stated the song was used in the video, which features the bandmembers dancing naked in a shower, because "it sounds like the soundtrack for a gay porn".

== Personnel ==
- Freddie Mercury – lead and backing vocals, synthesizer, Linn LM-1, synth bass
- Brian May – guitars
- Roger Taylor – electronic drums

== Charts ==
Country	Peak position
Austria (Ö3 Austria Top 40)	11
Australia	28
Belgium (Ultratop 50 Flanders)	17
Canada Top Singles (RPM)	3
Finland (Suomen Virallinen)	5
Ireland (IRMA)	13
Italy (Musica e Dischi)	13
Netherlands (Dutch Top 40)	6
Netherlands (Single Top 100)	4
New Zealand (Recorded Music NZ)	19
Norway (VG-lista)	6
Poland	3
Spain (AFYVE)	12
Sweden (Sverigetopplistan)	10
UK	25
United States Hot 100	11
US Dance Club Songs (Billboard)	62
US Mainstream Rock (Billboard)	19
US Hot R&B/Hip-Hop Songs (Billboard)	30
West Germany (GfK)	27
