= Teo Torriatte (Let Us Cling Together) =

- Japanese single picture sleeve

Single by Queen

from the album A Day at the Races
- B-side: "Good Old-Fashioned Lover Boy"
- Released: 25 March 1977
- Recorded: July – November 1976
- Genre: Progressive rock; art rock
- Length: 5:55 (LP version); 4:47 (single version)
- Label: Elektra
- Songwriter: Brian May
- Producer: Queen

Queen singles chronology
"Tie Your Mother Down" (1977)	"Teo Torriatte (Let Us Cling Together)" (1977)	"Long Away" (1977)

Music video
- "Teo Torriatte (Let Us Cling Together)" on YouTube

"Teo Torriatte (Let Us Cling Together)" (Japanese title: "手をとりあって", te wo toriatte) is a song by Queen from their 1976 album A Day at the Races. Written by guitarist Brian May, it is the closing track on the album.

The song is notable for having two choruses sung entirely in Japanese, and it was released as a single exclusively in Japan, reaching #49 on the charts. (The B-side was "Good Old-Fashioned Lover Boy".) This song features a "plastic piano" (Vox electric piano) and harmonium, both of which are played by May. They brought in a local choir to sing the chorus at the end. On the album, the song is crossfaded to a one-minute instrumental featuring a Shepard tone melody, which is actually a reprise of the beginning of the album's opening track, "Tie Your Mother Down", giving the album a cyclical feel.

== Personnel ==
Queen

- Freddie Mercury – lead and backing vocals
- Brian May – harmonium, acoustic piano, Vox electronic piano, guitars, backing vocals
- Roger Taylor – drums, tambourine, percussion, backing vocals
- John Deacon – bass guitar

Additional musicians

- Uncredited choir - backing vocals

== Live performances ==
It was performed live in Tokyo during the Jazz Tour in 1979 and again when the band visited Japan during The Game and Hot Space tours in 1981 and 1982, respectively. When Queen returned to Japan with Paul Rodgers in 2005, a truncated acoustic version was played during May's solo set. The same arrangement was used for Queen + Adam Lambert's festival appearances in Japan in summer 2014. Two years later, during the Japanese gigs of the Queen + Adam Lambert 2016 Summer Festival Tour, the song was played in its entirety featuring the full band.

== Live recordings ==
- Super Live in Japan (2005)

== In other media ==
"Teo Torriatte" was covered by Japanese singer Kokia on her 2008 Christmas album Christmas Gift, and by Mêlée in 2010 and can be found on the Japanese version of their album The Masquerade released in Japan on 18 August 2010. Andre Matos (former Angra singer) covered the song on the Japanese Edition of his 2010 effort Mentalize. Queen's version is also one of 38 songs included on the benefit album, Songs for Japan (compiled in response to the aftermath of the earthquake and tsunami in Tōhoku), released on 25 March 2011. An extract from the song was used as the musical accompaniment for a montage of the Olympic torch relay at the 2020 Summer Olympics opening ceremony ("Hope Lights Our Way") on 23 July 2021.

The song's alternative title is used on strategy video game Tactics Ogre: Let Us Cling Together.

== Romanisation of the title ==
The song's title is a romanisation of the phrase "te o toriatte" (手を取り合って, 'holding hands'); "Teo" is the romanisation of te (手, hand), plus the Japanese particle wo/o (を). "Torriatte", such as on the back cover of the A Day at the Races album and their official website, is spelled with a double "r", which does not conform to romanisation systems in Japan. The Japanese single's cover gave the romanised version of the title as "Teo Toriatte", a standard single "r".

== Chorus translation ==
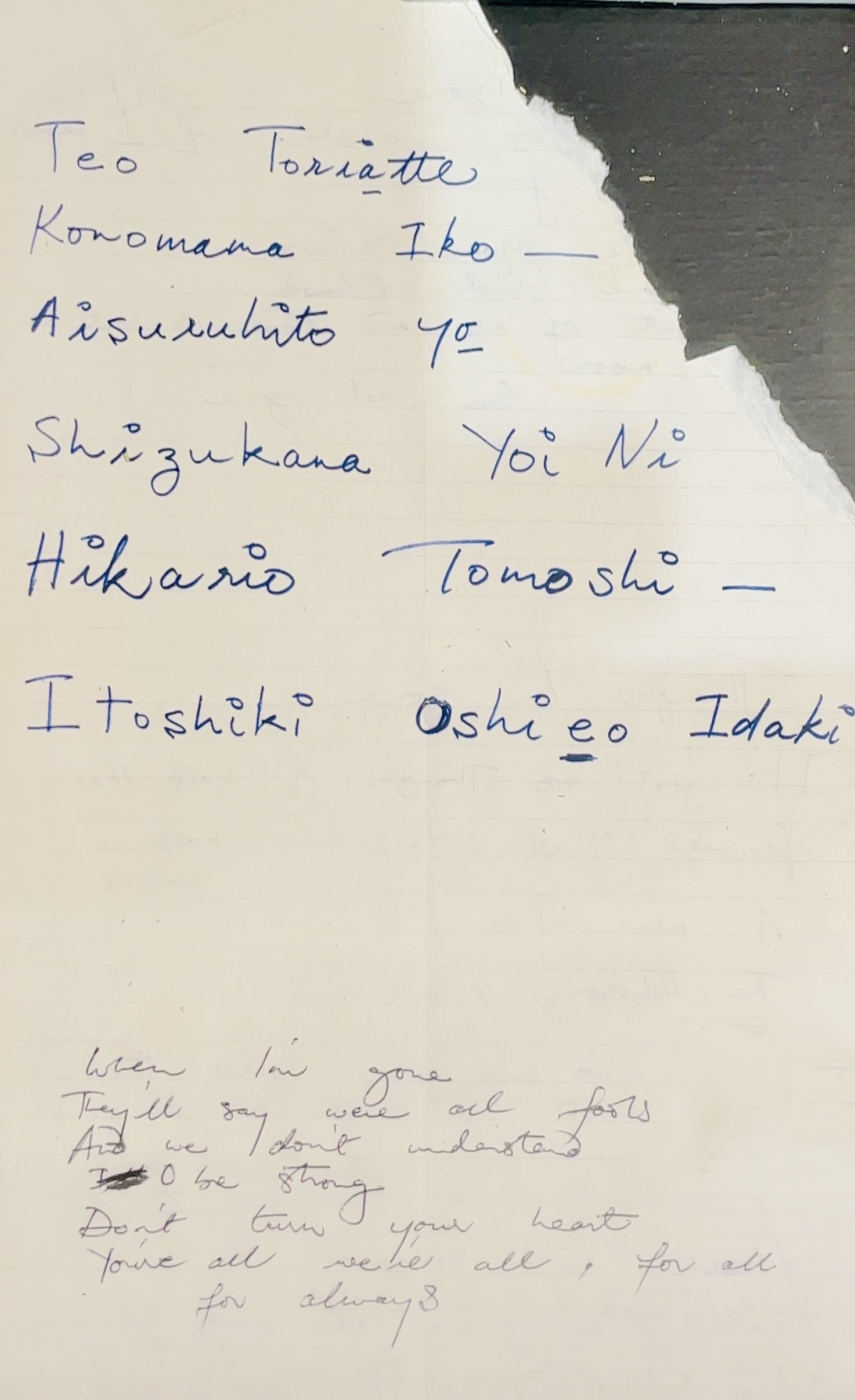
Lyrics in handwriting by Freddie Mercury

The chorus part sung in Japanese goes as follows:

手を取り合って このまま行こう (Te o toriatte konomama ikou/Let's go hand in hand)
愛する人よ (Aisuru hito yo/my beloved.)
静かな宵に (Shizukana yoi ni/In a quiet evening)
光を灯し (Hikari o tomoshi/Light the light)
愛しき教えを抱き (Itoshiki oshie o idaki/Embracing loving teachings)

The chorus part sung in English:

Let us cling together as the years go by,
Oh my love, my love,
In the quiet of the night
Let our candle always burn,
Let us never lose the lessons we have learned.

The Japanese version is an approximate translation from the English original. The album liner notes includes a translation credit: "With special thanks to our Japanese friend and interpreter Chika Kujiraoka."
