= Las Palabras de Amor =

"Las Palabras de Amor (The Words of Love)"
- A-side label for the UK vinyl single

Single by Queen

from the album Hot Space
- B-side: "Cool Cat"
- Released: 1 June 1982
- Recorded: 1981–1982
- Studio: Musicland, Munich
- Genre: Soft rock
- Length: 4:29
- Label: EMI
- Songwriter(s): Brian May
- Producer(s): Queen; Reinhold Mack

Queen singles chronology
"Body Language" (1982)	"Las Palabras de Amor (The Words of Love)" (1982)	"Calling All Girls" (1982)

"Las Palabras de Amor (The Words of Love)" is a rock ballad by the British rock band Queen. It was released as the third single from their 1982 album Hot Space. It is sung mostly in English, but with several Spanish phrases. Written by guitarist Brian May, the song proved more popular in the United Kingdom than their previous single ("Body Language"), reaching No. 17 in the UK Singles Chart.

Despite the mixed response to its parent album, "Las Palabras de Amor" has become a fan favourite.

== Background ==
The song's lyrics were written by guitarist Brian May. Vocals were provided by lead singer Freddie Mercury with May on the high harmony vocal. The song was inspired by the band's close relationship with their Argentinian fans. It marked the band's final studio appearance on Top of the Pops (having previously appeared to promote "Seven Seas of Rhye", "Killer Queen", "Now I'm Here" and "Good Old-Fashioned Lover Boy" respectively). For this mimed performance May is seen playing a grand piano as well as his guitar and, on the recording, he plays both piano and synths in addition to acoustic and electric guitars. May also sang lead vocals for the harmonized line "this night and evermore" throughout the song.

During the Freddie Mercury Tribute Concert at Wembley Stadium in 1992, this was the third song of the second half, performed by Zucchero and Queen. In Queen + Paul Rodgers Rock The Cosmos-tour 2008 it was played in the Spanish speaking countries, sung by May.

This song also made it onto 1999 Queen's Greatest Hits III and, more recently, on the Queen Forever compilation. It also appears on the Greatest Video Hits 2 DVD released in November 2003.

Musical theatre actress Elaine Paige recorded the song on her album of Queen covers The Queen Album in 1988.

The baby's face image of the single's cover would reappear on The Cross single for their song "New Dark Ages".

== Personnel ==
Queen

- Freddie Mercury – lead and backing vocals
- Brian May – electric and 12-string acoustic guitars, keyboards, backing and co-lead vocals
- Roger Taylor – drums, backing vocals
- John Deacon – bass guitar

== Charts ==
Country	Peak position
Belgium (Ultratop 50 Flanders)	26
Ireland (IRMA)	10
Netherlands (Dutch Top 40)	26
Netherlands (Single Top 100)	18
Poland	1
Switzerland (Schweizer Hitparade)	13
UK Singles (OCC)	17
West Germany (GfK)	68
