= Back Chat =

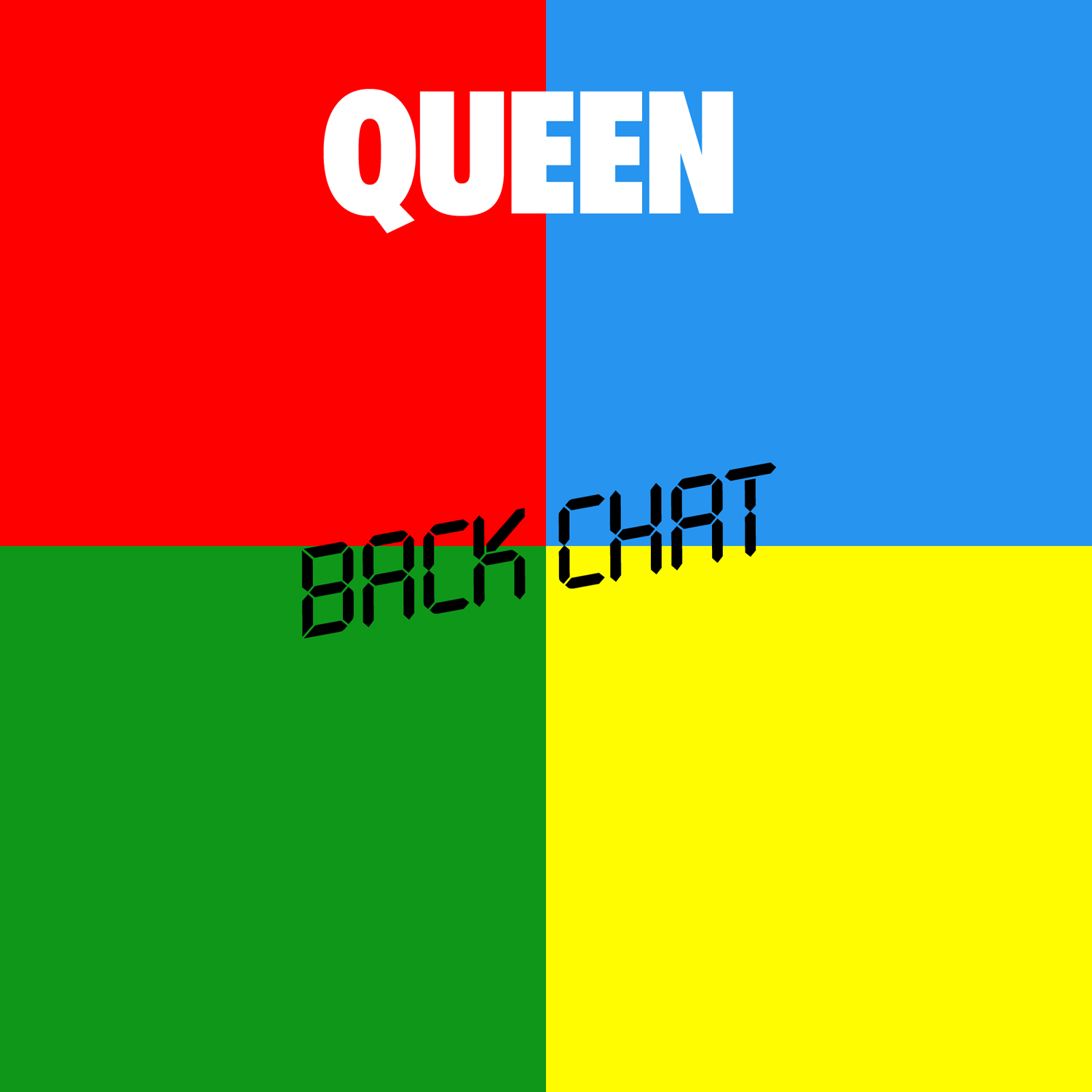
- UK single picture sleeve

Single by Queen

from the album Hot Space
- B-side: "Staying Power"
- Released: 9 August 1982 (UK); 23 November 1982 (US)
- Recorded: 1981 – 1982
- Genre: Funk rock; new wave
- Length: 4:31 (album version); 4:10 (single version); 6:55 (12" extended version)
- Label: EMI (UK); Elektra (US)
- Songwriter: John Deacon
- Producers: Queen; Reinhold Mack

Queen singles chronology
| "Staying Power" (1982) | "Back Chat" (1982) | "Radio Ga Ga" (1984) |

Music video
- "Back Chat" on YouTube

"Back Chat", written by the bass guitarist John Deacon, is the track most influenced by funk on the 1982 Queen album Hot Space. The song is a prime example of how Deacon was strongly pulling the band into dance oriented genres such as R&B, disco, and funk. It reached #40 on the UK Singles Chart, #18 in South Africa and a #19 entry in Ireland.

The track was performed on the Hot Space Tour at a faster tempo, with a more rock-oriented arrangement. "Back Chat", the title, is an English idiom referring to "impertinent or impudent replies, especially to a superior". In a Rolling Stone album review, critic John Milward described the musical style of the song as: "a hot rock-funk tune, with guitar tracks as slick as an icy dance floor."

== Critical reception ==
Upon its release, Johnny Waller of Sounds called "Back Chat" "custom made disposable pop in a sense", but believed it would be a "huge hit and deservedly so". He continued, "It's a great little pop song, with a deft guitar ripple intro, a bass line that Grandmaster Flash will liberate as soon as he hears it, and a simple, catchy danceable tune."

== Track listings ==
7" Single

A Side. "Back Chat" (Single Version) – 4:10

B Side. "Staying Power" – 4:10

12" Single

A Side. "Back Chat" (Extended Version) – 6:55

B Side. "Staying Power" – 4:10

== Personnel ==
Instruments sourced from Queenvinyls.

- Freddie Mercury – lead and backing vocals
- Brian May – electric guitar solos
- Roger Taylor – Simmons drums
- John Deacon – bass guitar, electric guitars, Jupiter-8, Linn LM-1

== Chart performance ==
| Chart (1982) | Peak position |
|---|---|
| Ireland (IRMA) | 19 |
| South Africa (Springbok Radio) | 18 |
| UK Singles (Official Charts) | 40 |
| France (SNEP) | 8 |
| West Germany (GfK) | 69 |
