= Hot Space =

Studio album by Queen
- Released: 4 May 1982
- Recorded: June 1981 – March 1982
- Studios: Mountain (Montreux, Switzerland); Musicland (Munich, West Germany)
- Genres: Pop rock; new wave; synth-pop; dance; funk; electro-funk; electro-disco; R&B
- Length: 43:29
- Labels: EMI; Elektra
- Producers: Queen; Reinhold Mack; David Bowie

Queen chronology
Greatest Hits (1981)	Hot Space (1982)	The Works (1984)

Queen studio album chronology
Flash Gordon (1980)	Hot Space (1982)	The Works (1984)

Singles from Hot Space
- 1. "Under Pressure" Released: 27 October 1981; 2. "Body Language" Released: 19 April 1982; 3. "Las Palabras de Amor" Released: 1 June 1982; 4. "Calling All Girls" Released: 19 July 1982 (US); 5. "Staying Power" Released: July 1982 (Japan); 6. "Back Chat" Released: 9 August 1982

Hot Space is the tenth studio album by the British rock band Queen. It was released on 4 May 1982 by EMI Records in the United Kingdom and by Elektra Records in the United States. Marking a notable shift in direction from their earlier work, they employed many elements of disco, funk, R&B, dance, synth-pop and new wave music on the album. Combined with the ongoing backlash against disco music, this made the album less popular with fans who preferred the traditional rock style they had come to associate with the band. Queen's decision to record a dance-oriented album germinated with the massive success of their 1980 hit "Another One Bites the Dust" in the US.

"Under Pressure", Queen's collaboration with David Bowie, was released in 1981 and became the band's second number one hit in the UK. Although included on Hot Space, the song was a separate project and was recorded ahead of the album, before the controversy over Queen's new disco-influenced rock sound. The album's second single, "Body Language", peaked at number 11 on the US charts.

== Songs ==
=== Overview ===
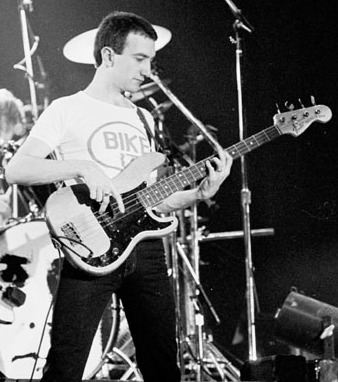
John Deacon spearheaded the album's disco approach.

Before 1979, Queen had never used synthesisers on their albums. Beginning with The Game, Queen began using Oberheim OB-X synthesisers on their songs, including "Play the Game" and "Save Me". On Hot Space, the band went even further, introducing the drum machine for the first time. A departure from their trademark 1970s sound, most of Hot Space is a mixture of rhythm and blues, funk, dance and disco, while the rock songs continued in a pop rock direction similar to their previous album (an exception is the song "Put Out the Fire").

During an interview in 1984, Roger Taylor affirmed that "it was really John [Deacon]" who turned the band towards a more disco sound. Elaborating, he said: "John's always been R&B orientated, our bass player who wrote 'Another One Bites The Dust', ... which turned out to be the biggest selling record of the year. And I think that was the song that catapulted us into taking that road. I think we went too far and did too much. ... Everybody in the band feels that way now."

Disliking the new sound, Brian May and Taylor were critical of the influence that Paul Prenter, Freddie Mercury's personal manager between 1977 and 1984, had on the singer. Recalling the recording process in 2011, Taylor openly criticized the direction in which Prenter was taking Mercury (and thus the rest of the band), stating that "[Prenter] wanted our music to sound like you'd just walked in a gay club...and I didn't". May also noted that the making of the album in Munich took much longer than usual and that all of the band got into "deep emotional trouble" in the city, blaming a mixture of drink, drugs and partying as the reason for the relatively lengthy recording sessions. According to Reinhold Mack, Queen's producer, Prenter loathed rock music and was in Mercury's ear throughout the Hot Space sessions. Prenter also refused all requests from US radio stations to speak to Mercury. May states, "this guy, in the course of one tour, told every record station to fuck off. But not just "fuck off", but "Freddie says, ‘fuck off’". Queen roadie Peter Hince wrote "None of the band cared for him [Prenter], apart from Freddie", with Hince regarding Mercury's favouring of Prenter as an act of "misguided loyalty".

=== Side one ===
==== "Staying Power" ====
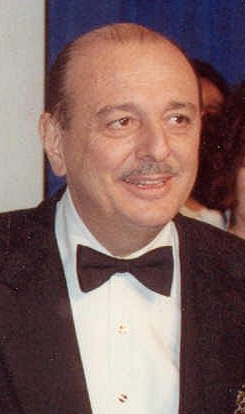
Arif Mardin contributed horn arrangements to "Staying Power".

The horn arrangement for Mercury's "Staying Power" was added by Arif Mardin. "Staying Power" would be performed on the band's accompanying Hot Space Tour, albeit much faster and heavier, with real drums replacing the drum machine and guitars and keyboards replacing the horns. (This arrangement contained no bass guitar, for John Deacon played guitar in addition to May.) It was also played on Queen's The Works Tour, until it was dropped from the setlist halfway through the European leg of the tour. In Japan, the band released "Staying Power" as a single in July 1982. Mardin's contributions were recorded at Record Plant Studios in New York. The original demo of the track featured a guitar instead of horns.

==== "Dancer" ====
The bassline of May's "Dancer" was played on an Oberheim OB-Xa synthesiser by him. The song itself – a fusion of rock and disco – is something of a follow-up to "Dragon Attack" from the band's 1980 album The Game in that it fuses heavy elements of music with danceable ones. The phone message at the end of "Dancer" ("Guten Morgen, Sie wünschten, geweckt zu werden") is in German, and was recorded in a hotel room in Munich; it translates as "Good morning, you wanted to be woken up." The lyrics of "Dancer" are also notable for being the only ones on the album that make reference to the album title itself.

==== "Back Chat" ====
"Back Chat", written by John Deacon, is the track most influenced by black music. In addition to his usual bass duties, Deacon also plays rhythm guitar and synthesiser on the song. As the album's final single, it stalled at number 40 on the UK charts and failed to chart in the US.

==== "Body Language" ====
"Body Language" is atypical among Queen songs, as there is very little guitar on the track, with the song being driven by a rhythmic bassline. Mercury, who composed the song on synth bass, had previously explored the instrument's potential with his contributions to the Flash Gordon soundtrack. The song's lyrics describe the gay cruising culture which Mercury was immersed in at the time. The "Body Language" video, featuring scantily clad models writhing around each other in a bathlike setting, proved somewhat controversial and was banned in a few territories. The song also appeared in the 1984 documentary film Stripper, being performed to by one of the dancers. Whilst the video was restricted to late-night showings on MTV, it nonetheless helped the song become the album's biggest hit in America, reaching number 11 on the Billboard Hot 100 in June 1982.

==== "Action This Day" ====
"Action This Day", one of two Taylor songs that appear on the album, was clearly influenced by the new wave movement/style current at the time; the track is driven by a pounding electronic drum machine in 2/4 time and features a saxophone solo, played by Italian session musician Dino Solera. "Action This Day" takes its title from a Winston Churchill catchphrase that the statesman would attach to urgent documents, and recapitulates the theme of social awareness that Taylor espoused in many of his songs. The band performed "Action This Day" at every show on the Hot Space Tour with a more conventional arrangement, replacing the drum machine and bass synth with a rock rhythm section and replacing the saxophone solo with a synthesizer. The verses are duets between Taylor and Mercury, while the chorus is sung by both.

=== Side two ===
==== "Put Out the Fire" ====
"Put Out the Fire" is an anti-firearms song written by May, featuring lead vocals and falsetto by Mercury, and backing vocals by Mercury, May and Taylor. May recorded its guitar solo under the influence of alcohol (after many unsuccessful attempts).

Though never released as a single, "Put Out the Fire", the album's most traditional Queen song, later appeared on the Queen Rocks compilation in 1997. A new video was also produced for the accompanying video compilation, featuring a live performance of the song intercut with footage of fire and explosions. It also received significant airplay on AOR stations in the United States, peaking at #15 on the Billboard Mainstream Rock chart.

==== "Life Is Real (Song for Lennon)" ====
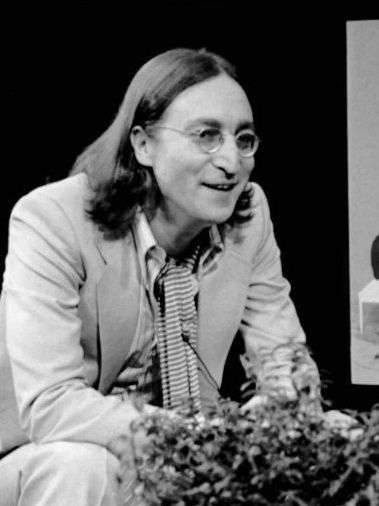
"Life Is Real" was written in honour of murdered Beatles vocalist John Lennon.

Mercury wrote "Life Is Real" as a tribute to John Lennon, whose murder in 1980 had also previously prompted the band to perform his song "Imagine" on tour. It is also one of the few Mercury songs whose lyrics were written before the music.

"Life Is Real (Song for Lennon)" was not played live on the European leg of the tour. It was only played a couple of times on the North American leg. While not released as a single, it received enough AOR radio airplay in the United States to peak at No. 57 on the Billboard Mainstream Rock chart.

==== "Calling All Girls" ====
The first Queen song written by Taylor to be released as a single (albeit in selected countries, including the US and Australia, but not the UK), "Calling All Girls" failed to create much of an impact on the charts where it peaked at number 60 in the US and number 33 in Canada, despite its music video based on the George Lucas film THX 1138. Taylor composed "Calling All Girls" on guitar and played the feedback noises during the song's break. Queen never performed the song in Europe, but a live recording from Japan in 1982 is commercially available on the Queen on Fire – Live at the Bowl DVD, where "Calling All Girls" accompanies the photo gallery. The single was released in July 1982.

==== "Las Palabras de Amor (The Words of Love)" ====
May's lyrics for "Las Palabras de Amor" were inspired by Queen's close relationship with their Latin American fans. A top 20 hit in the UK, "Las Palabras de Amor" marked the band's fifth single to feature at least one in-studio appearance on Top of the Pops, the others being "Seven Seas of Rhye" (three performances, only partially still existing), "Killer Queen" (two performances, one of which only partially exists), "Now I'm Here" (two performances, with only one of them partially existing) and "Good Old-Fashioned Lover Boy" (one performance). For this mimed performance, May is seen playing a grand piano, although he only played synthesizers on the recording. May also sang lead vocals for the harmonised line "this night and evermore".

==== "Cool Cat" ====
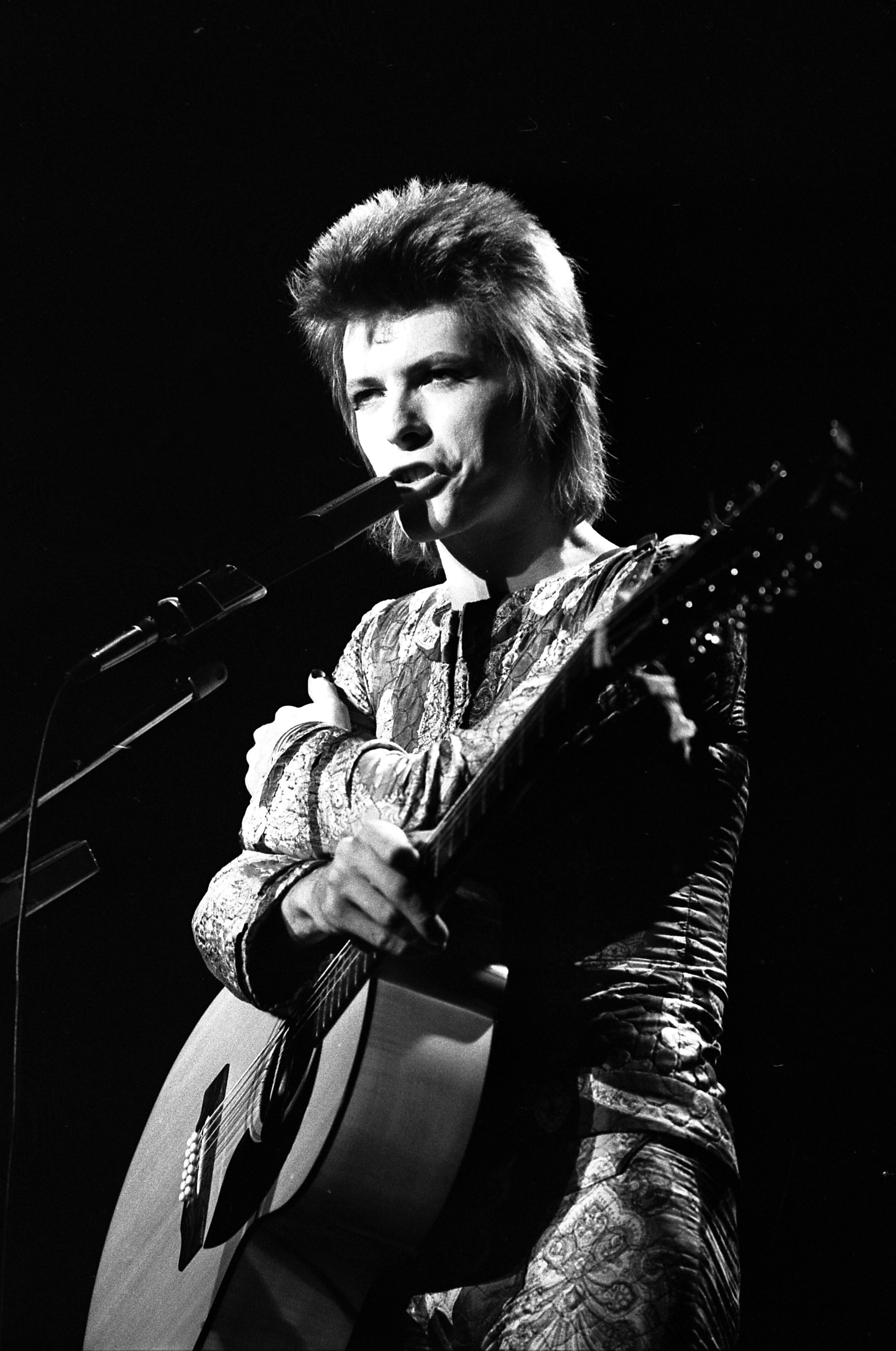
David Bowie contributed vocals to "Cool Cat" and "Under Pressure", though his parts on the former were removed at his request.

"Cool Cat", written by Mercury and Deacon, originally featured David Bowie on backing vocals and a few lines of spoken word to a rhythm during the middle eight. According to Mercury in a 1982 TV interview, Bowie was unhappy with the results and requested that his vocals be removed days before its parent album was slated to be released. With the exception of the electric piano (which was played by Mercury), all the instruments are played by Deacon, including guitars, synths and a drum machine. On the album version, Mercury sings most of the song in falsetto. The alternate take with Bowie's vocals still intact is widely available on various bootleg recordings and surfaces from an early 1982 vinyl Hot Space test pressing from the US. Deacon can be heard using the slap bass technique throughout the track. The song was used in 2023 in an Amazon Prime commercial featuring a young woman who, among other things, has a bobblehead of Mercury and buys a jacket on Prime similar to the one the bobblehead is wearing.

==== "Under Pressure" ====
A duet with David Bowie, "Under Pressure" was the result of an impromptu jam session in the band's studio in Montreux. When it was released in 1981, "Under Pressure" reached number one in the UK singles chart. The entire band and Bowie are credited with writing the track; however, Mercury was its primary director, and Bowie and he were the main lyricists (each writing the lines they sang). John Deacon came up with the bass riff. Part of the chord progression is based on a rough demo of an unreleased song, "Feel Like".

== Tour ==
The 1982 Hot Space Tour was Queen's last tour of North America until the Queen + Paul Rodgers Tour in 2005. The band did not tour North America for The Works tour in 1984, nor The Magic tour in 1986, after which they ceased touring, due to Mercury's ill-health with AIDS.

== Release and reception ==
Professional ratings
Review scores
Source	Rating
AllMusic	2.5/5 stars
Chicago Tribune	1/4 stars
Encyclopedia of Popular Music	1/5 stars
The Guardian	2/5 stars
MusicHound Rock	2/5 stars
Rolling Stone	3/5 stars
The Rolling Stone Album Guide	2/5 stars
Smash Hits	5/10
Sounds	4/5 stars

Due to its dance-pop sound, Hot Space has garnered mixed views over time. Sandy Robertson of Sounds gave the album four stars, describing it as "fairly lickable funkpop" featuring "'Put Out The Fire'... with, plenty screaming Brian May axe histrionics ... a ballad in the old boy's mode called 'Life Is Real' ... a candymix of phasers, acoustics and electrics in 'Calling All Girls' ... sleazy keyboard/vocal pomp sobs in 'Las Palabras De Amor' ... a languid summer streak and slow slide through 'Cool Cat' and the cornerstone 'Under Pressure' itself."

Rolling Stone's review at the time said Queen offered "a bit more than bluster", but described all but four of the songs as "at best, routinely competent and, at times, downright offensive".

Retrospectively, Stephen Thomas Erlewine of AllMusic said of the album that "the band that once proudly proclaimed not to use synthesizers on their albums has suddenly, dramatically reversed course, devoting the entire first side of the album to robotic, new wave dance-pop, all driven by drum machines and colored by keyboards, with Brian May's guitar coming in as flavor only on occasion." Alex Petridis of The Guardian gave the album two stars and said: "Like Queen, disco was melodramatic, unrepentantly camp, extravagantly arranged and omnivorous in its influences. Or at least it had been. By the time of 1982's Hot Space, disco had mutated into the weird, skeletal, dubby electronic sound pioneered by DJ Larry Levan, which really didn't suit Queen at all." Despite this, "Under Pressure" remains one of the band's staple songs.

== Legacy ==
In a 1986 interview, Deacon stated that the reception Hot Space received was "a blow to our inner confidence as a group and it took us quite a while to get back and sort ourselves up for The Works".

Michael Jackson, who was close friends with the band during the time, later cited Hot Space as an influence for his own album Thriller.

In a 2015 interview with Greg Prato of Songfacts, Extreme guitarist Nuno Bettencourt described how Hot Space had been an important album for him as a musician. "I think it's interesting because that album taught me two things. It taught me that even if you're in a band as a guitar player, music doesn't have to be driven by guitar – it's about the song, first. But I think the main thing is that Queen actually did an album like that – it was the fans' least favorite, but it was one of my favorites because it took a risk and branched out. All those synth parts they did and horns, I could always hear them with guitar in my head somehow. But quite oddly enough, or coincidentally enough, the title Hot Space is exactly what it meant: it's all the space between the music. That's what makes it funky and that's what makes it have a pocket."

In the 2011 documentary Queen: Days of our Lives, Queen's former manager Jim Beach described Hot Space as "a disaster really [...] it didn't appeal to the hardcore Queen fans who would turn up to concerts with 'Disco Sucks' banners."

After the conclusion of the Hot Space tour in late 1982, the band would rarely include songs from the album in their later live set-lists with only "Under Pressure" remaining as a staple until their final concerts in 1986.

== Track listing ==
All lead vocals by Freddie Mercury unless noted.

Side one
No.	Title	Writer(s)	Lead vocals	Length
1.	"Staying Power"	Mercury		4:11
2.	"Dancer"	Brian May		3:49
3.	"Back Chat"	John Deacon		4:35
4.	"Body Language"	Mercury		4:32
5.	"Action This Day"	Roger Taylor	Mercury and Taylor	3:32

Side two
No.	Title	Writer(s)	Lead vocals	Length
6.	"Put Out the Fire"	May	Mercury with May	3:19
7.	"Life Is Real (Song for Lennon)"	Mercury		3:32
8.	"Calling All Girls"	Taylor		3:51
9.	"Las Palabras de Amor (The Words of Love)"	May	Mercury with May	4:31
10.	"Cool Cat"	Mercury; Deacon		3:29
11.	"Under Pressure" (with David Bowie)	Taylor; Mercury; David Bowie; Deacon; May	Mercury and Bowie	4:06
Total length:				43:29

Bonus track (1991 Hollywood Records CD reissue)
No.	Title	Writer(s)	Length
12.	"Body Language" (1991 bonus remix by Susan Rogers)	Mercury	4:44
Total length:			48:13

Disc 2: Bonus EP (2011 Universal Music CD reissue)
No.	Title	Writer(s)	Length
1.	"Staying Power" (Live at Milton Keynes Bowl, June 1982)	Mercury	3:57
2.	"Soul Brother" (B-side to "Under Pressure")	Mercury	3:36
3.	"Back Chat" (Single remix)	Deacon	4:12
4.	"Action This Day" (Live at Seibu Lions Stadium in Tokorozawa, November 1982)	Taylor	6:25
5.	"Calling All Girls" (Live at Seibu Lions Stadium in Tokorozawa, November 1982)	Taylor	4:45
Total length:			22:55

Bonus videos (2011 iTunes deluxe edition)
No.	Title	Length
6.	"Las Palabras de Amor" (Top of the Pops video, 1982)	4:30
7.	"Under Pressure" (1999 Rah Mix Promo Video)	4:10
8.	"Action This Day" (live at Milton Keynes Bowl, June 1982)	4:46
Total length:		35:41

== Personnel ==
Track numbering refers to CD and digital releases of the album. Specific instruments sourced from Queenvinyls.

Queen

- Freddie Mercury – lead vocals (all tracks), backing vocals (all tracks), keyboards (1, 4, 5, 7, 10, 11), drum machine (1, 4), synth bass (1, 4)
- Brian May – electric guitar (all but 10), backing vocals (2, 6, 9), co-lead vocals (6, 9), acoustic guitar (7–9), drum machine (2), synth bass (2), keyboards (9)
- Roger Taylor – acoustic and electronic drums (all but 10), backing vocals (2, 5, 6, 9, 11), percussion (2, 6, 8), co-lead vocals (5), synthesizer (5), electric guitar (5), acoustic guitar (8)
- John Deacon – bass guitar (3, 6–11), electric guitar (1, 3, 10), drum machine (3, 10), synthesizer (3, 10)

Additional personnel

- David Bowie – lead vocals and synthesizer (11)
- Arif Mardin – "hot and spacey" horn arrangement and production (1)
- Reinhold Mack – production; synth bass (5)
- Dino Solera – saxophones (5)
- David Richards – piano (11)

== Charts ==
=== Weekly charts ===
Chart (1982)	Peak position
Argentina (CAPIF)	7
Australian Albums (Kent Music Report)	15
Austrian Albums (Ö3 Austria)	1
Canada Top Albums/CDs (RPM)	6
Dutch Albums (Album Top 100)	1
Finnish Albums (The Official Finnish Charts)	10
French Albums (SNEP)	7
German Albums (Offizielle Top 100)	5
Italian Albums (Musica e Dischi)	9
Japanese Albums (Oricon)	6
New Zealand Albums (RMNZ)	5
Norwegian Albums (VG-lista)	3
Swedish Albums (Sverigetopplistan)	4
UK Albums (Official Charts)	4
US Billboard 200	22

=== Year-end charts ===
Chart (1982)	Position
Austrian Albums Chart	17
Canadian Albums Chart	46
French Albums Chart	14
UK Albums Chart	51

== Certifications ==
Region	Certification	Certified units/sales
Austria (IFPI Austria)	Gold	25,000^{*}
Canada (Music Canada)	Gold	50,000^{^}
Japan (RIAJ)	Gold	100,000^{^}
New Zealand (RMNZ)	Platinum	15,000^{‡}
Poland (ZPAV)	Platinum	20,000^{*}
South Africa (RISA)	Gold	25,000^{*}
United Kingdom (BPI)	Gold	100,000^{^}
United States (RIAA)	Gold	500,000^{^}
^{*} Sales figures based on certification alone.^{^} Shipments figures based on certification alone.^{‡} Sales+streaming figures based on certification alone.

== Bibliography ==
- Blake, Mark (2016). Freddie Mercury: A Kind of Magic. Omnibus Press.
