= List of songs recorded by Queen =

Songs recorded by British rock band

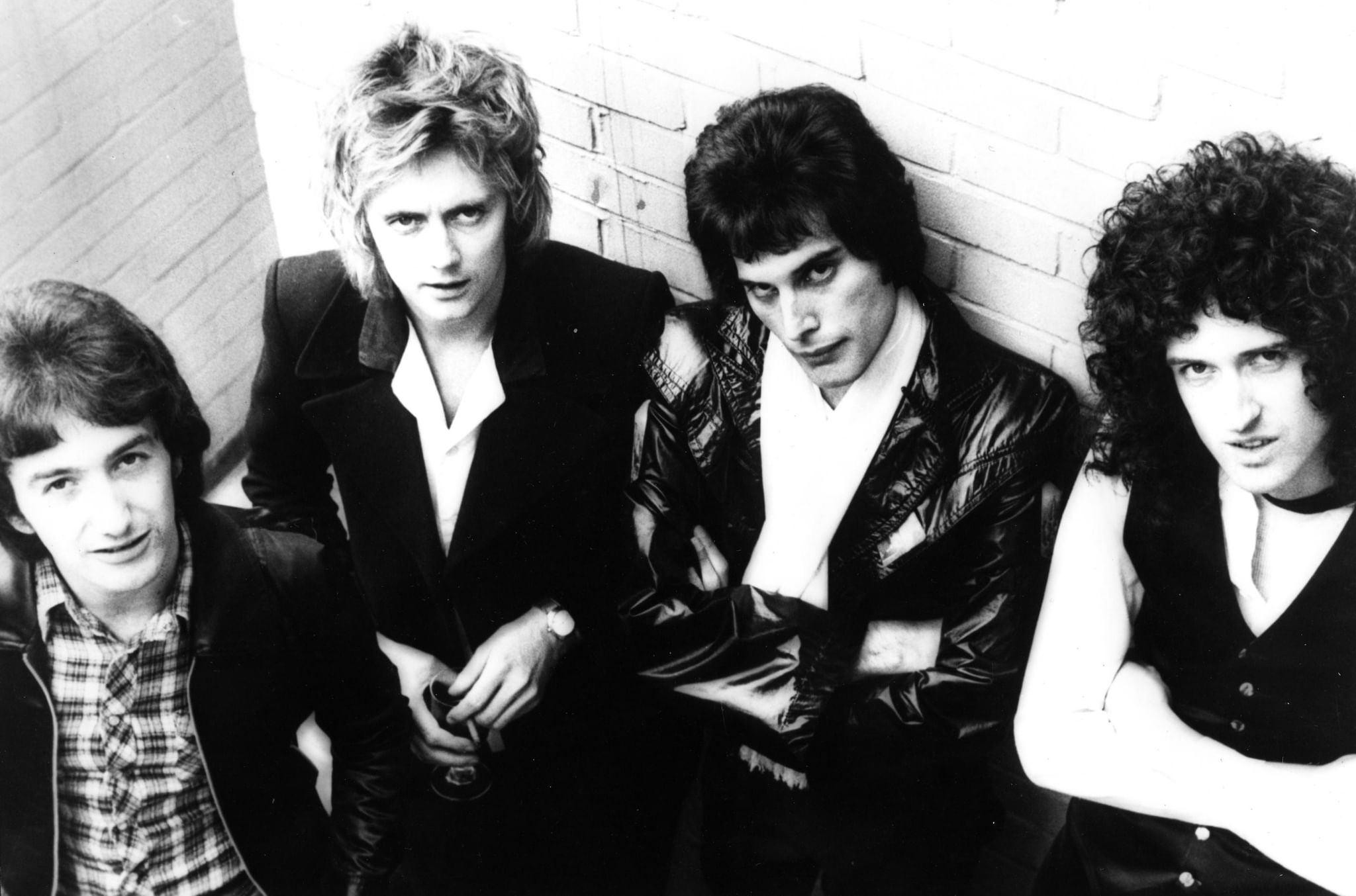
Queen in 1977; from left to right: John Deacon, Roger Taylor, Freddie Mercury and Brian May.

This is a list of all songs recorded by Queen.

== Main songs ==
Key
‡	Indicates song released as a single

Name of song, original release, year of release, writer(s) and lead vocalist
Title	Original release	Year	Writer(s)	Lead vocal(s)	Ref.
"'39"	A Night at the Opera	1975	May	May	
"Action This Day"	Hot Space	1982	Taylor	Taylor & Mercury	
"All Dead, All Dead"	News of the World	1977	May	May & Mercury	
"All God's People"	Innuendo	1991	Queen/Mike Moran (Mercury/Moran)	Mercury	
"Another One Bites the Dust" ‡	The Game	1980	Deacon	Mercury	
"Arboria (Planet of the Tree Men)"	Flash Gordon	1980	Deacon	Instrumental	
"Back Chat" ‡	Hot Space	1982	Deacon	Mercury	
"Battle Theme"	Flash Gordon	1980	May	Instrumental	
"Bicycle Race" ‡	Jazz	1978	Mercury	Mercury	
"Bijou"	Innuendo	1991	Queen (May/Mercury)	Mercury	
"Blurred Vision"	B-side of "One Vision"	1985	Queen	Mercury (with May & Taylor)	
"Body Language" ‡	Hot Space	1982	Mercury	Mercury	
"Bohemian Rhapsody" ‡	A Night at the Opera	1975	Mercury	Mercury Taylor & May (part of the operatic section)	
"Breakthru" ‡	The Miracle	1989	Queen (Taylor/Mercury)	Mercury	
"Brighton Rock"	Sheer Heart Attack	1974	May	Mercury; May (one line)	
"Bring Back That Leroy Brown"	Sheer Heart Attack	1974	Mercury	Mercury	
"Calling All Girls" ‡	Hot Space	1982	Taylor	Mercury	
"Chinese Torture"	The Miracle (CD edition)	1989	Queen (May)	Instrumental	
"Coming Soon"	The Game	1980	Taylor	Taylor & Mercury	
"Cool Cat"	Hot Space	1982	Deacon/Mercury	Mercury	
"Crash Dive On Mingo City"	Flash Gordon	1980	May	Instrumental	
"Crazy Little Thing Called Love" ‡	The Game	1979	Mercury	Mercury	
"Dancer"	Hot Space	1982	May	Mercury	
"Dead On Time"	Jazz	1978	May	Mercury	
"Dear Friends"	Sheer Heart Attack	1974	May	Mercury	
"Death on Two Legs (Dedicated to...)"	A Night at the Opera	1975	Mercury	Mercury	
"Delilah"	Innuendo	1991	Queen (Mercury)	Mercury	
"Doing All Right"	Queen	1973	May, Tim Staffell	Mercury	
"Don't Lose Your Head"	A Kind of Magic	1986	Taylor	Taylor & Mercury	
"Don't Stop Me Now" ‡	Jazz	1978	Mercury	Mercury	
"Don't Try So Hard"	Innuendo	1991	Queen (Mercury/Deacon)	Mercury	
"Don't Try Suicide"	The Game	1980	Mercury	Mercury	
"A Dozen Red Roses For My Darling"	B-side of "A Kind of Magic"	1986	Taylor	Instrumental	
"Dragon Attack"	The Game	1980	May	Mercury	
"Dreamer's Ball"	Jazz	1978	May	Mercury	
"Drowse"	A Day at the Races	1976	Taylor	Taylor	
"Escape from the Swamp"	Flash Gordon	1980	Taylor	Instrumental	
"Execution of Flash"	Flash Gordon	1980	Deacon	Instrumental	
"The Fairy Feller's Master-Stroke"	Queen II	1974	Mercury	Mercury	
"Fat Bottomed Girls" ‡	Jazz	1978	May	Mercury & May	
"Father to Son"	Queen II	1974	May	Mercury	
"Fight from the Inside"	News of the World	1977	Taylor	Taylor	
"Flash's Theme" (Note: The album version is titled "Flash's Theme" while the shorter single release is simply titled "Flash".) ‡	Flash Gordon	1980	May	May & Mercury	
"Flash to the Rescue"	Flash Gordon	1980	May	Instrumental (chorus from May, Mercury, Taylor)	
"Flash's Theme Reprise (Victory Celebrations)"	Flash Gordon	1980	May	Mercury, May, Taylor	
"Flick of the Wrist"	Sheer Heart Attack	1974	Mercury	Mercury	
"Football Fight"	Flash Gordon	1980	Mercury	Instrumental	
"Forever"	A Kind of Magic (CD edition)	1986	May	Instrumental	
"Friends Will Be Friends" ‡	A Kind of Magic	1986	Mercury/Deacon	Mercury	
"Fun It"	Jazz	1978	Taylor	Taylor & Mercury	
"Funny How Love Is"	Queen II	1974	Mercury	Mercury	
"Get Down, Make Love"	News of the World	1977	Mercury	Mercury	
"Gimme the Prize (Kurgan's Theme)"	A Kind of Magic	1986	May	Mercury	
"God Save the Queen"	A Night at the Opera	1975	Traditional, arr. May	Instrumental	
"Good Company"	A Night at the Opera	1975	May	May	
"Good Old-Fashioned Lover Boy" ‡	A Day at the Races	1976	Mercury	Mercury & Mike Stone	
"Great King Rat"	Queen	1973	Mercury	Mercury	
"Hammer to Fall" ‡	The Works	1984	May	Mercury (verses); May (chorus)	
"Hang On in There"	B-side of "I Want It All"	1989	Queen (May)	Mercury	
"Headlong" ‡	Innuendo	1991	Queen (May)	Mercury	
"Heaven for Everyone" ‡	Made in Heaven	1995	Taylor	Mercury	
"The Hero"	Flash Gordon	1980	May	Mercury, May & Taylor	
"Hijack My Heart"	B-side of "The Invisible Man"	1989	Queen (Taylor)	Taylor	
"The Hitman"	Innuendo	1991	Queen (Mercury/May)	Mercury	
"A Human Body"	B-side of "Play the Game"	1980	Taylor	Taylor	
"I Can't Live with You"	Innuendo	1991	Queen (May)	Mercury	
"I Go Crazy"	B-side of "Radio Ga Ga"	1984	May	Mercury; May (bridge)	
"I Want It All" ‡	The Miracle	1989	Queen (May)	May & Mercury	
"I Want to Break Free" ‡	The Works	1984	Deacon	Mercury	
"I Was Born to Love You" ‡	Made in Heaven	1995	Mercury	Mercury	
"If You Can't Beat Them"	Jazz	1978	Deacon	Mercury	
"I'm Going Slightly Mad" ‡	Innuendo	1991	Queen (Mercury)	Mercury	
"I'm in Love with My Car"	A Night at the Opera	1975	Taylor	Taylor	
"In Only Seven Days"	Jazz	1978	Deacon	Mercury	
"In the Death Cell (Love Theme Reprise)"	Flash Gordon	1980	Taylor	Instrumental	
"In the Lap of the Gods"	Sheer Heart Attack	1974	Mercury	Mercury (lyrics); Taylor (screaming)	
"In the Lap of the Gods... Revisited"	Sheer Heart Attack	1974	Mercury	Mercury	
"In the Space Capsule (The Love Theme)"	Flash Gordon	1980	Taylor	Instrumental	
"Innuendo" ‡	Innuendo	1991	Queen (Mercury/Taylor)	Mercury	
"The Invisible Man" ‡	The Miracle	1989	Queen (Taylor)	Taylor & Mercury	
"Is This the World We Created...?"	The Works	1984	Mercury/May	Mercury	
"It's a Beautiful Day"	Made in Heaven	1995	Queen (Mercury)	Mercury	
"It's a Beautiful Day (Reprise)"	Made in Heaven	1995	Queen (Mercury)	Mercury	
"It's a Hard Life" ‡	The Works	1984	Mercury	Mercury	
"It's Late" ‡	News of the World	1977	May	Mercury	
"Jealousy" ‡	Jazz	1978	Mercury	Mercury	
"Jesus"	Queen	1973	Mercury	Mercury	
"Keep Passing the Open Windows"	The Works	1984	Mercury	Mercury	
"Keep Yourself Alive" ‡	Queen	1973	May	Mercury; May (one line); Taylor (one line)	
"Khashoggi's Ship"	The Miracle	1989	Queen (Mercury)	Mercury	
"Killer Queen" ‡	Sheer Heart Attack	1974	Mercury	Mercury	
"A Kind of Magic" ‡	A Kind of Magic	1986	Taylor	Mercury	
"The Kiss (Aura Resurrects Flash)"	Flash Gordon	1980	Mercury	Instrumental	
"Las Palabras de Amor (The Words of Love)" ‡	Hot Space	1982	May	Mercury	
"Lazing on a Sunday Afternoon"	A Night at the Opera	1975	Mercury	Mercury	
"Leaving Home Ain't Easy"	Jazz	1978	May	May	
"Let Me Entertain You"	Jazz	1978	Mercury	Mercury	
"Let Me Live" ‡	Made in Heaven	1995	Queen	May, Mercury, Taylor	
"Liar" ‡	Queen	1973	Mercury	Mercury	
"Life Is Real (Song For Lennon)"	Hot Space	1982	Mercury	Mercury	
"Lily of the Valley"	Sheer Heart Attack	1974	Mercury	Mercury	
"Long Away" ‡	A Day at the Races	1976	May	May	
"The Loser in the End"	Queen II	1974	Taylor	Taylor	
"Lost Opportunity"	B-side of "I'm Going Slightly Mad"	1991	Queen (May)	May	
"Love of My Life"	A Night at the Opera	1975	Mercury	Mercury	
"Machines (or 'Back to Humans')"	The Works	1984	May/Taylor	Mercury	
"Mad the Swine"	B-side of "Headlong"	1991	Mercury	Mercury	
"Made in Heaven"	Made in Heaven	1995	Mercury	Mercury	
"Man on the Prowl"	The Works	1984	Mercury	Mercury	
"The March of the Black Queen"	Queen II	1974	Mercury	Mercury; Taylor (two lines)	
"Marriage of Dale & Ming (And Flash Approaching)"	Flash Gordon	1980	May/Taylor	Instrumental	
"The Millionaire Waltz"	A Day at the Races	1976	Mercury	Mercury	
"Ming's Theme (In the Court of Ming the Merciless)"	Flash Gordon	1980	Mercury	Instrumental	
"The Miracle" ‡	The Miracle	1989	Queen (Mercury/Deacon)	Mercury	
"Misfire"	Sheer Heart Attack	1974	Deacon	Mercury	
"Modern Times Rock 'n' Roll"	Queen	1973	Taylor	Taylor	
"More of That Jazz"	Jazz	1978	Taylor	Taylor	
"Mother Love"	Made in Heaven	1995	May/Mercury	Mercury & May	
"Mustapha" ‡	Jazz	1978	Mercury	Mercury	
"My Baby Does Me"	The Miracle	1989	Queen (Deacon/Mercury)	Mercury	
"My Fairy King"	Queen	1973	Mercury	Mercury	
"My Life Has Been Saved"	Made in Heaven	1995	Deacon	Mercury	
"My Melancholy Blues"	News of the World	1977	Mercury	Mercury	
"Need Your Loving Tonight" ‡	The Game	1980	Deacon	Mercury	
"Nevermore"	Queen II	1974	Mercury	Mercury	
"The Night Comes Down"	Queen	1973	May	Mercury	
"No-One but You (Only the Good Die Young)" ‡	Queen Rocks	1997	May	May & Taylor	
"Now I'm Here" ‡	Sheer Heart Attack	1974	May	Mercury	
"Ogre Battle"	Queen II	1974	Mercury	Mercury	
"One Vision" ‡	A Kind of Magic	1985	Queen (Taylor)	Mercury	
"One Year of Love" ‡	A Kind of Magic	1986	Deacon	Mercury	
"Pain Is So Close to Pleasure" ‡	A Kind of Magic	1986	Mercury/Deacon	Mercury	
"Party"	The Miracle	1989	Queen (Mercury/Deacon/May)	Mercury	
"Play the Game" ‡	The Game	1980	Mercury	Mercury	
"Princes of the Universe" ‡	A Kind of Magic	1986	Mercury	Mercury	
"Procession"	Queen II	1974	May	Instrumental	
"The Prophet's Song"	A Night at the Opera	1975	May	Mercury	
"Put Out the Fire"	Hot Space	1982	May	Mercury & May	
"Radio Ga Ga" ‡	The Works	1984	Taylor	Mercury & Taylor	
"Rain Must Fall"	The Miracle	1989	Queen (Deacon/Mercury)	Mercury	
"Ride the Wild Wind"	Innuendo	1991	Queen (Taylor)	Mercury	
"The Ring (Hypnotic Seduction of Dale)"	Flash Gordon	1980	Mercury	Instrumental	
"Rock It (Prime Jive)"	The Game	1980	Taylor	Taylor & Mercury	
"Sail Away, Sweet Sister"	The Game	1980	May	May & Mercury	
"Save Me" ‡	The Game	1980	May	Mercury	
"Scandal" ‡	The Miracle	1989	Queen (May)	Mercury	
"Seaside Rendezvous"	A Night at the Opera	1975	Mercury	Mercury	
"See What a Fool I've Been"	B-side of "Seven Seas of Rhye"	1974	May	Mercury	
"Seven Seas of Rhye"	Queen	1973	Mercury	Instrumental	
"Seven Seas of Rhye" ‡	Queen II	1974	Mercury	Mercury	
"She Makes Me (Stormtrooper in Stilettoes)"	Sheer Heart Attack	1974	May	May	
"Sheer Heart Attack"	News of the World	1977	Taylor	Mercury (verses); Taylor (chorus)	
"The Show Must Go On" ‡	Innuendo	1991	Queen (May)	Mercury	
"Sleeping on the Sidewalk"	News of the World	1977	May	May	
"Some Day, One Day"	Queen II	1974	May	May	
"Somebody to Love" ‡	A Day at the Races	1976	Mercury	Mercury	
"Son And Daughter”	Queen	1973	May	Mercury	
"Soul Brother"	B-side of "Under Pressure"	1981	Queen	Mercury	
"Spread Your Wings" ‡	News of the World	1977	Deacon	Mercury	
"Staying Power" ‡	Hot Space	1982	Mercury	Mercury	
"Stealin'"	B-side of "Breakthru"	1989	Queen	Mercury	
"Stone Cold Crazy"	Sheer Heart Attack	1974	Queen	Mercury	
"Sweet Lady"	A Night at the Opera	1975	May	Mercury	
"Tear It Up"	The Works	1984	May	Mercury	
"Tenement Funster"	Sheer Heart Attack	1974	Taylor	Taylor	
"Teo Torriatte (Let Us Cling Together)" ‡	A Day at the Races	1976	May	Mercury	
"Thank God It's Christmas" ‡	Non-album single	1985	Taylor/May	Mercury	
"These Are the Days of Our Lives" ‡	Innuendo	1991	Queen (Taylor)	Mercury	
"Tie Your Mother Down" ‡	A Day at the Races	1976	May	Mercury	
"Too Much Love Will Kill You" ‡	Made in Heaven	1995	May; Frank Musker; Elizabeth Lamers	Mercury	
"Track 13"	Made in Heaven (CD edition)	1995	Queen (David Richards, Taylor, May)	Mercury	
"Under Pressure" (Note: Later released on Hot Space (1982)) ‡ (Queen & David Bowie)	Non-album single	1981	Queen/David Bowie	Mercury & David Bowie	
"Vultan's Theme (Attack of the Hawk Men)"	Flash Gordon	1980	Mercury	Instrumental	
"Was It All Worth It"	The Miracle	1989	Queen (Mercury)	Mercury	
"We Are the Champions" ‡	News of the World	1977	Mercury	Mercury	
"We Will Rock You" ‡	News of the World	1977	May	Mercury	
"The Wedding March"	Flash Gordon	1980	Arr. May	Instrumental	
"White Man"	A Day at the Races	1976	May	Mercury	
"White Queen (As It Began)"	Queen II	1974	May	Mercury	
"Who Needs You"	News of the World	1977	Deacon	Mercury	
"Who Wants to Live Forever" ‡	A Kind of Magic	1986	May	May & Mercury	
"A Winter's Tale"	Made in Heaven	1995	Queen (Mercury)	Mercury	
"Yeah"	Made in Heaven	1995	Queen	Mercury (spoken)	
"You And I"	A Day at the Races	1976	Deacon	Mercury (with Taylor)	
"You Don't Fool Me" ‡	Made in Heaven	1995	Queen (Mercury/Taylor)	Mercury	
"You Take My Breath Away"	A Day at the Races	1976	Mercury	Mercury	
"You're My Best Friend" ‡	A Night at the Opera	1975	Deacon	Mercury	

== Released live and session recordings ==
Key
†	Indicates song not written by any members of Queen
‡	Indicates song released as a single
#	Indicates demo recording
*	Indicates live recording

Name of song, first release, year recorded, year released, songwriter(s) and lead vocalist(s)
Title	Release	Year recorded	Year released	Writer(s)	Lead vocal(s)	Ref.
"Big Spender"*	Live at Wembley '86	1986	1992	Cy Coleman, Dorothy Fields †	Mercury	
"Dog With A Bone"	The Miracle Collector's Edition	1988	2022	Taylor	Taylor & Mercury	
"Face It Alone" (Note: A four-minute version was released as a single on 13 October 2022.) ‡	The Miracle Collector's Edition	1988	2022	Queen	Mercury	
"Feelings, Feelings"#	News of the World (2011 Bonus EP)	1977	2011	May	Mercury	
"Gimme Some Lovin"*	Live at Wembley '86	1986	1992	Steve Winwood, Spencer Davis, Muff Winwood †	Mercury	
"Hangman"*	Queen I Collector's Edition	1976	2024	Queen	Mercury	
"Hello Mary Lou"*	Live at Wembley '86	1986	1992	Gene Pitney, Cayet Mangiaracina †	Mercury	
"I Guess We're Falling Out"#	The Miracle Collector's Edition	1988	2022	May	Mercury	
"I'm a Man"*	Queen I Collector's Edition	1970	2024	Bo Diddley †	Mercury	
"Jailhouse Rock"*	We Are the Champions: Final Live in Japan	1985	1992	Jerry Leiber, Mike Stoller †	Mercury	
"Let Me in Your Heart Again"	Queen Forever	1983	2014	May	Mercury	
"Love Kills - the Ballad" ‡	Queen Forever	1983	2014	Mercury; Giorgio Moroder	Mercury	
"Not For Sale (Polar Bear)"	Queen II Collector's Edition	1974	2026	May	Mercury	
"Tavaszi szél vizet áraszt"*	Hungarian Rhapsody: Queen Live in Budapest	1986	2012	Traditional †	Mercury	
"There Must Be More to Life Than This" (Note: Originally recorded by Freddie Mercury for his solo album Mr. Bad Guy (1985). Another version, with American singer Michael Jackson on co-lead vocals, appears on Queen Forever (2014).) (Queen & Michael Jackson)	Queen Forever	1981	2014	Mercury	Mercury & Michael Jackson	
"Tutti Frutti"*	Live at Wembley '86	1986	1992	Richard Penniman, Dorothy LaBostrie †	Mercury	
"Water"#	The Miracle Collector's Edition	1988	2022	May	May	
"We Will Rock You (Fast)"*‡	Live Killers	1979	1979	May	Mercury	
"When Love Breaks Up"#	The Miracle Collector's Edition	1988	2022	Mercury	Mercury	
"You Know You Belong to Me"	The Miracle Collector's Edition	1988	2022	May	May	
"(You're So Square) Baby I Don't Care"*	Live at Wembley '86	1986	1992	Jerry Leiber, Mike Stoller †	Mercury	

== Unreleased songs ==
Name of song, year recorded, writer(s), lead vocalist, intended release
Title	Year recorded	Writer(s)	Lead vocal(s)	Intended release	Ref.
"Feel Like" (Note: Later became "Under Pressure")	1981	Taylor	Mercury		
"Silver Salmon"		Tim Staffell	Mercury		
