= The 12″ Collection =

Compilation album by Queen
- Released: May 1992
- Recorded: 1975–1990
- Genre: Rock
- Length: 70:04
- Label: Queen Productions Ltd.; Parlophone
- Producer: Various

Queen chronology
Live at Wembley '86 (1992)	The 12″ Collection (1992)	Five Live (1993)

The 12″ Collection is a compilation album by British rock band Queen which was only available via the Box of Tricks box set. It features various 12-inch single format recordings and remixes. "Bohemian Rhapsody" was never released on a 12-inch single and the sleeve notes state that it is included due to its length.

"The Show Must Go On" did appear on a 12-inch single, but not as an extended version. The sleeve notes do not mention why it was included.

== Track listing ==
The 12″ Collection track listing
No.	Title	Writer(s)	Length
1.	"Bohemian Rhapsody"	Freddie Mercury	5:55
2.	"Radio Ga Ga"	Roger Taylor	6:52
3.	"Machines (or 'Back to Humans')"	Brian May; Taylor	5:08
4.	"I Want to Break Free"	John Deacon	7:19
5.	"It's a Hard Life"	Mercury	5:05
6.	"Hammer to Fall"	May	5:23
7.	"Man on the Prowl"	Mercury	6:04
8.	"A Kind of Magic"	Taylor	6:25
9.	"Pain Is So Close to Pleasure"	Mercury; Deacon	6:01
10.	"Breakthru"	Mercury; Taylor	5:44
11.	"The Invisible Man"	Taylor	5:29
12.	"The Show Must Go On"	May	4:32
Total length:			70:04
