= The Game Tour =

1980–1981 concert tour by Queen

- World tour by Queen
- Poster to the concerts in São Paulo, Brazil
- Location: Asia; Europe; North America; South America
- Associated album: The Game
- Start date: 30 June 1980
- End date: 18 October 1981
- Legs: 5
- No. of shows: 47 in North America; 18 in Europe; 5 in Asia; 10 in South America; 80 in total
- Attendance: 1,500,000

Queen concert chronology
- Crazy Tour (1979); The Game Tour (1980–1981); Hot Space Tour (1982)

The Game Tour was the eighth headlining concert tour by the British rock band Queen to support their successful 1980 album The Game. This tour featured the first performances in South America by the group.

== Background ==
This tour marked the introduction of a new lighting rig for Queen; the "Fly Swatters", also referred to as the "Bic Razors". This is also the first tour where Freddie Mercury had his moustache grown out. He would often ask the audience what they thought, to a mixed reception, where he would often pledge to keep it. Several songs from the new album were incorporated, such as "Play the Game", "Need Your Loving Tonight", and "Rock It". The latter two of which saw very few performances on this leg of the tour, with Rock It being dropped before the four Inglewood dates, and Need Your Loving Tonight being dropped in the middle of August. Both songs would return to the stage in one form or another. Notably, "Somebody to Love" was only performed rarely early in the tour, being practically absent in the first three legs, but would return as a staple to the set by early March in South America. Early in the North American tour, as suggested by bootleg recordings, Mercury's voice mostly retained his late 1970s vocal tone in July before changing it to a more "macho" and aggressive style in August to match his appearance.

=== 1980 ===
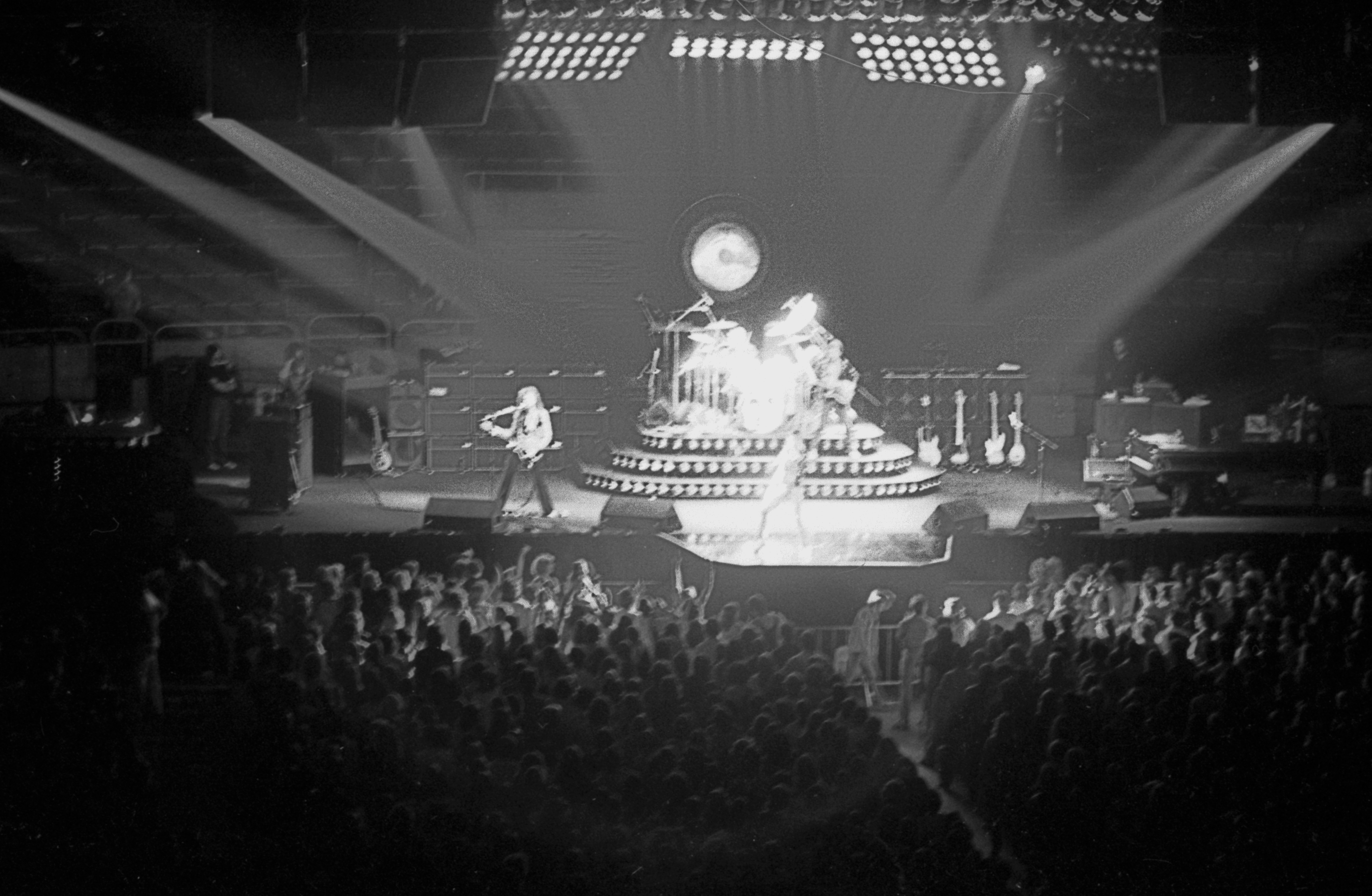
The July 14, 1980 concert at the Oakland–Alameda County Coliseum Arena

At one of the concerts in Inglewood, Michael Jackson recommended that the band release Another One Bites the Dust as a single, which they did. Believing it not to be single material, the song became a large success for the band, particularly in North America. The Hartford concert in August marks the first known time the song was played live. Dragon Attack was added to the set in Providence later that same month. "You're My Best Friend", a successful single for the band, was dropped from the medley after the last night of the North American leg, at the Madison Square Garden. Some encores of this leg featured Mercury on the shoulders of a Darth Vader cosplayer during the performance of "We Will Rock You".

At the start of the European leg of the tour, the Battle Theme from the Flash Gordon soundtrack was incorporated into the set. "Need Your Loving Tonight" was also reincorporated into the set after a lengthy absence, now coming after "Get Down, Make Love". The concert in Essen featured the first performance of "The Hero" from the Flash Gordon soundtrack, with the second night in Birmingham being the debut of "Flash's Theme".

Due to the murder of John Lennon on the 8th of December, the members of Queen created an arrangement of Lennon's greatest hit, "Imagine", which was played on a handful of dates (in place of "Keep Yourself Alive"), including the night after Lennon's death, and on the final night of the leg. "Need Your Loving Tonight" and "Jailhouse Rock" were also dropped on the 9th.

=== 1981 ===
On the Japanese leg of the tour, Vultan's Theme was added to the setlist on February 13, staying as part of the set until the end of the leg.

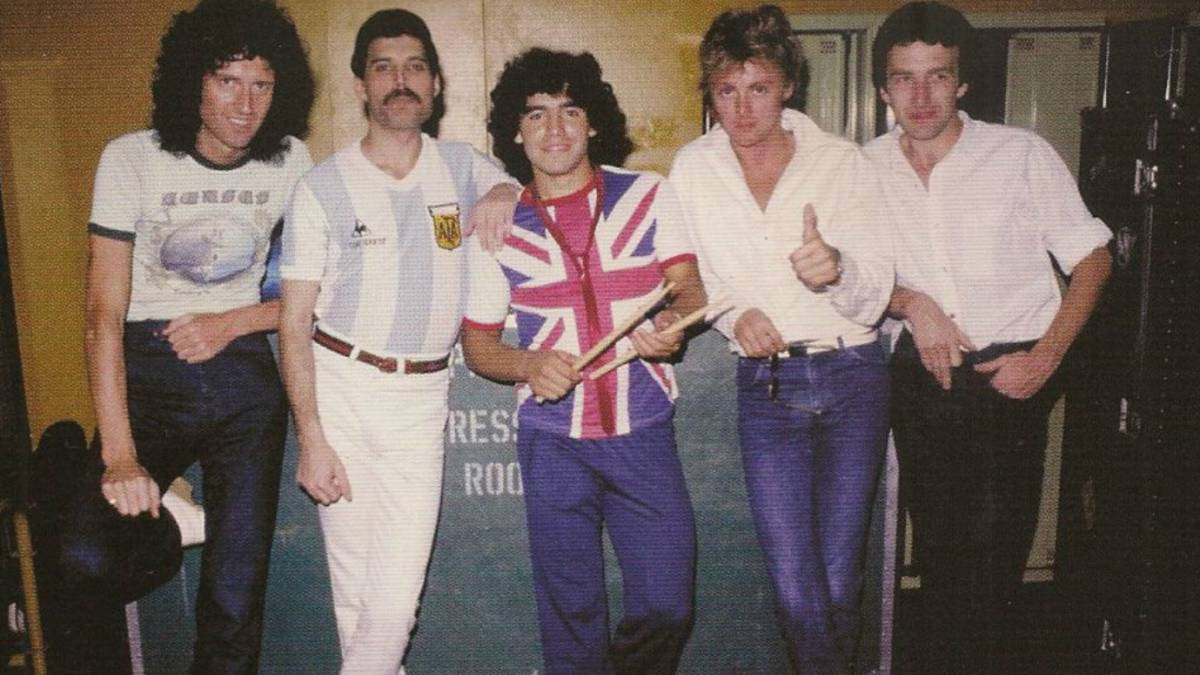
Queen (with Mercury in an Argentina jersey) meeting Diego Maradona (in a United Kingdom jersey) before their last concert in Buenos Aires, March 8, 1981

Queen was encouraged to play in South America, after discovering that they were extremely popular. In Buenos Aires, Queen drew a crowd of 300,000—the largest single concert crowd in Argentine history as of 1982. In São Paulo, Brazil, the attendance was 131,000 and 120,000 on two consecutive nights. All three Buenos Aires shows were filmed and broadcast, however, only the second night has its footage completely available. A fragment of both the first and third night's are all that are known to exist. The first São Paulo show was also broadcast and is widely available, however, the second night only circulates via a low quality broadcast, and a poor-quality bootleg.

This was the only tour that Queen played in Venezuela, where they were due to play 5 shows in its capital city, Caracas. However, after their third performance on 27 September, the Venezuelan government declared an 8-day period of National Mourning due to the passing of one of Venezuela's former president. The remaining two concerts were cancelled and all tickets were refunded to more than 50,000 fans. The third night was filmed and was eventually leaked.

Queen were due to play two nights in Monterrey and Guadalajara each, however, due to subpar treatment of the crew by locals during the first night in Monterrey, Queen cancelled the remaining three shows. Two nights in Puebla were quickly set up as replacements, where the band faced unruly crowds that often threw shoes at the band.

== Tour dates ==
List of tour dates with date, city, country, venue
Date	City	Country	Venue	Attendance	Gross	Ref(s)
North America
30 June 1980	Vancouver	Canada	Pacific Coliseum	17,500 / 17,500		
1 July 1980	Seattle	United States	Seattle Center Coliseum	14,098 / 14,098		
2 July 1980	Portland	United States	Portland Memorial Coliseum	12,888 / 12,888		
5 July 1980	San Diego	United States	San Diego Sports Arena	11,500 / 11,500	$110,000	
6 July 1980	Phoenix	United States	Compton Terrace	8,410 / 8,410	$77,351	
8 July 1980	Inglewood	United States	The Forum	60,800 / 60,800	$594,970	
9 July 1980	Inglewood	United States	The Forum	60,800 / 60,800	$594,970	
11 July 1980	Inglewood	United States	The Forum	60,800 / 60,800	$594,970	
12 July 1980	Inglewood	United States	The Forum	60,800 / 60,800	$594,970	
13 July 1980	Oakland	United States	Oakland Coliseum Arena	19,861 / 29,000	$179,466	
14 July 1980	Oakland	United States	Oakland Coliseum Arena	19,861 / 29,000	$179,466	
5 August 1980	Memphis	United States	Mid-South Coliseum	6,200 / 11,999	$50,611	
6 August 1980	Baton Rouge	United States	Riverside Centroplex Arena	9,000 / 9,000		
8 August 1980	Oklahoma City	United States	Myriad Convention Center	12,000 / 12,000		
9 August 1980	Dallas	United States	Reunion Arena	10,313 / 18,500	$90,925	
10 August 1980	Houston	United States	The Summit	10,222 / 17,048	$98,642	
12 August 1980	Atlanta	United States	Omni Coliseum	16,378 / 16,378		
13 August 1980	Charlotte	United States	Charlotte Coliseum	10,500 / 10,500		
14 August 1980	Greensboro	United States	Greensboro Coliseum	5,200 / 8598	$41,976	
16 August 1980	Charleston	United States	Charleston Civic Center	5,459 / 7,092	$43,262	
17 August 1980 (Note: The 17 August 1980 concert in Indianapolis originally part scheduled to take place on 7 September 1980.)	Indianapolis	United States	Market Square Arena			
20 August 1980 (Note: The 20 August 1980 concert in Hartford was originally scheduled to take place on 24 August 1980.)	Hartford	United States	Hartford Civic Center	9,930 /13,000	$91,590	
22 August 1980 (Note: The 22 August 1980 concert in Philadelphia was originally scheduled to take place on 27 August 1980.)	Philadelphia	United States	The Spectrum	14,117 / 18,454	$121,764	
23 August 1980 (Note: The 23 August 1980 concert in Baltimore was originally scheduled to take place on 26 August 1980.)	Baltimore	United States	Baltimore Civic Center	8,695 / 12,007	$73,827	
24 August 1980 (Note: The 24 August 1980 concert in Pittsburgh was originally scheduled to take place on 31 August 1980.)	Pittsburgh	United States	Pittsburgh Civic Arena	7,319 / 17,500	$64,260	
26 August 1980	Providence	United States	Providence Civic Center	14,000 / 14,000		
27 August 1980	Portland	United States	Cumberland County Civic Center	9,500 / 9,500		
29 August 1980	Montreal	Canada	Montreal Forum	16,403 / 16,403	$173,447	
30 August 1980	Toronto	Canada	CNE Grandstand	22,312 / 22,312	$227,166	
10 September 1980	Milwaukee	United States	MECCA Arena	6,705	N/A	
12 September 1980	Kansas City	United States	Kemper Arena	10,825 / 12,000	$100,529	
13 September 1980	Omaha	United States	Omaha Civic Auditorium	9,136 / 9,136		
14 September 1980	Saint Paul	United States	St. Paul Civic Center	13,900	$133,000	
16 September 1980	Ames	United States	Hilton Coliseum	9,215 / 10,372	$84,143	
17 September 1980	St. Louis	United States	Checkerdome	6,667 / 10,000	$61,295	
19 September 1980	Rosemont	United States	Rosemont Horizon	14,618 / 14,618		
20 September 1980	Detroit	United States	Joe Louis Arena	15,559 / 15,559	$152,955	
21 September 1980	Richfield	United States	Richfield Coliseum	20,273 / 20,273		
23 September 1980	Glens Falls	United States	Glens Falls Civic Center	7,500 / 7,500	$67,694	
24 September 1980	Syracuse	United States	Onondaga County War Memorial	8,000 / 8,000		
26 September 1980 (Note: The 26 September 1980 concert in Boston was originally scheduled to take place on 3 September 1980.)	Boston	United States	Boston Garden	13,000 / 13,000	$131,580	
28 September 1980	New York City	United States	Madison Square Garden	50,000 / 50,000	$500,000	
29 September 1980	New York City	United States	Madison Square Garden	50,000 / 50,000	$500,000	
30 September 1980	New York City	United States	Madison Square Garden	50,000 / 50,000	$500,000	
Europe
23 November 1980	Zürich	Switzerland	Hallenstadion	12,000 / 12,000		
25 November 1980	Paris	France	La Rotonde du Bourget	11,000 / 11,000		
26 November 1980	Cologne	West Germany	Sporthalle	8,000 / 8,000		
27 November 1980	Leiden	Netherlands	Groenoordhallen	11,000 / 11,000		
29 November 1980	Essen	West Germany	Grugahalle	10,500 / 10,500		
30 November 1980	West Berlin	West Germany	Deutschlandhalle	11,000 / 11,000		
1 December 1980	Bremen	West Germany	Stadthalle Bremen	11,000 / 11,000		
5 December 1980	Birmingham	England	Birmingham International Arena	29,000 / 29,000		
6 December 1980	Birmingham	England	Birmingham International Arena	29,000 / 29,000		
8 December 1980	London	England	Wembley Arena	33,000 / 33,000		
9 December 1980	London	England	Wembley Arena	33,000 / 33,000		
10 December 1980	London	England	Wembley Arena	33,000 / 33,000		
12 December 1980	Brussels	Belgium	Forest National	18,000 / 18,000		
13 December 1980	Brussels	Belgium	Forest National	18,000 / 18,000		
14 December 1980	Frankfurt	West Germany	Festhalle Frankfurt	14,000 / 14,000		
16 December 1980	Strasbourg	France	Hall Rhénus	10,000 / 10,000		
18 December 1980	Munich	West Germany	Olympiahalle	12,000 / 12,000		
Asia
12 February 1981	Tokyo	Japan	Nippon Budokan	70,000 / 70,000		
13 February 1981	Tokyo	Japan	Nippon Budokan	70,000 / 70,000		
16 February 1981	Tokyo	Japan	Nippon Budokan	70,000 / 70,000		
17 February 1981	Tokyo	Japan	Nippon Budokan	70,000 / 70,000		
18 February 1981	Tokyo	Japan	Nippon Budokan	70,000 / 70,000		
South America Bites the Dust
28 February 1981	Buenos Aires	Argentina	José Amalfitani Stadium	63,000		
1 March 1981	Buenos Aires	Argentina	José Amalfitani Stadium	63,000		
4 March 1981 (Note: The 4 March 1981 concert in Mar del Plata was originally scheduled to take place at Estadio Olímpico in Monterrey.)	Mar del Plata	Argentina	Estadio José María Minella	30,000		
6 March 1981	Rosario	Argentina	Estadio Gigante de Arroyito	41,654		
8 March 1981	Buenos Aires	Argentina	José Amalfitani Stadium	65,500		
20 March 1981	São Paulo	Brazil	Estádio do Morumbi	131,000		
21 March 1981	São Paulo	Brazil	Estádio do Morumbi	120,000		
Gluttons for Punishment
25 September 1981	Caracas	Venezuela	Poliedro de Caracas	45,000 / 45,000		
26 September 1981	Caracas	Venezuela	Poliedro de Caracas	45,000 / 45,000		
27 September 1981	Caracas	Venezuela	Poliedro de Caracas	45,000 / 45,000		
9 October 1981	Monterrey	Mexico	Estadio Universitario	45,000 / 45,000		
17 October 1981	Puebla	Mexico	Estadio Ignacio Zaragoza	100,000 / 100,000		
18 October 1981	Puebla	Mexico	Estadio Ignacio Zaragoza	100,000 / 100,000		

=== Cancelled concerts ===
16 August 1980	New York City	Battery Park Open Air	Cancelled.
17 August 1980	Cincinnati	Riverfront Coliseum	Cancelled.
2 September 1980	New Haven	Veterans Memorial Coliseum	Cancelled.
5 September 1980	Lexington	Rupp Arena	Cancelled.
9 September 1980	Madison	Dane County Coliseum	Cancelled.
13 March 1981	Porto Alegre	Estádio Olímpico Monumental	Cancelled.
27 March 1981	Rio de Janeiro	Maracanã Stadium	Rescheduled to October 1981, then cancelled.
29 September 1981	Caracas	Poliedro de Caracas	Cancelled due to Romulo Betancourt's national mourning period.
30 September 1981	Caracas	Poliedro de Caracas	Cancelled due to Romulo Betancourt's national mourning period.
10 October 1981	Monterrey	Estadio Universitario	Cancelled.
15 October 1981	Guadalajara	Estadio Jalisco	Cancelled.
16 October 1981	Guadalajara	Estadio Jalisco	Cancelled.

== Personnel ==
- Freddie Mercury – lead vocals, piano, guitar ("Crazy Little Thing Called Love"), tambourine.
- Brian May – guitar, backing vocals, piano.
- Roger Taylor – drums, timpani, lead vocals ("I'm in Love With My Car"), backing vocals.
- John Deacon – bass guitar, additional vocals
