= The Crown Jewels (box set) =

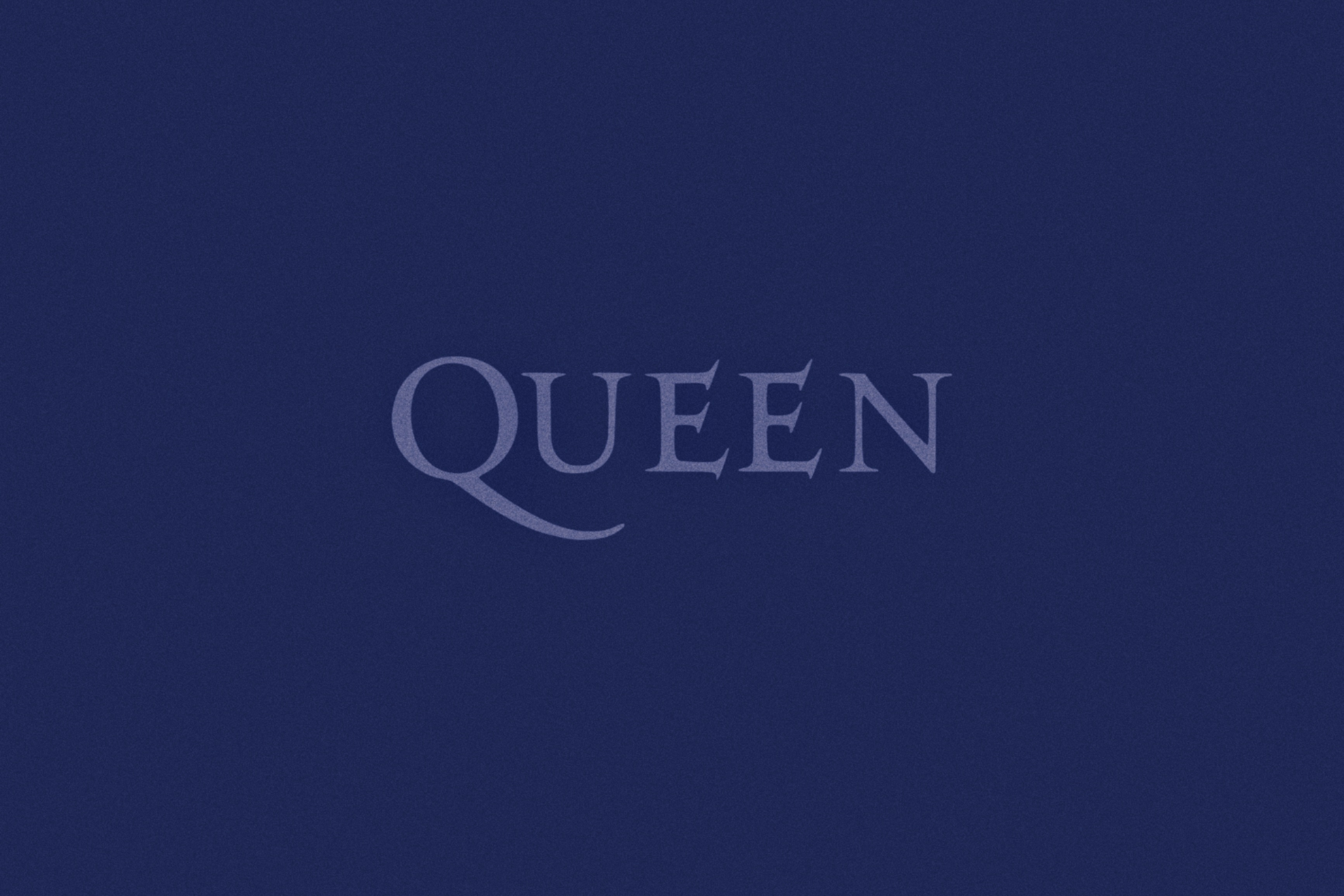

Box set by Queen
- Released: 24 November 1998
- Recorded: 1971–1980
- Genres: Rock; hard rock
- Length: 325:46
- Label: Hollywood

Queen chronology
Queen Rocks (1997)	The Crown Jewels (1998)	Greatest Hits III (1999)

The Crown Jewels is a box set by Queen which comprises their first eight studio albums; Queen, Queen II, Sheer Heart Attack, A Night at the Opera, A Day at the Races, News of the World, Jazz and The Game; in sleeves replicating the original vinyl packaging. The last three albums in the set (News of the World, Jazz and The Game) all have modified packaging with alternative covers. A lyric booklet is also included. All the albums have been remastered. The box set marks the 25th anniversary of the group's existence dated to the release of their first album.

== 8 CD set ==
- Queen (1973) – 38:47
- Queen II (1974) – 40:47
- Sheer Heart Attack (1974) – 39:02
- A Night at the Opera (1975) – 43:03
- A Day at the Races (1976) – 44:22
- News of the World (1977) – 39:20
- Jazz (1978) – 44:47
- The Game (1980) – 35:38
