= I Want It All (Queen song) =

1989 single by Queen

- UK single picture sleeve

Single by Queen

from the album The Miracle
- B-side: "Hang On in There"; "I Want It All" (album version)
- Released: 2 May 1989
- Recorded: 1988
- Genre: Hard rock; arena rock
- Length: 4:41 (album version); 4:01 (single version); 4:30 (Queen Rocks version)
- Label: Parlophone (UK); Capitol (US)
- Songwriters: Brian May; Queen (credited)
- Producers: David Richards; Queen

Queen singles chronology
"Who Wants to Live Forever" (1986)	"I Want It All" (1989)	"Breakthru" (1989)

Music video
- "I Want It All" on YouTube

"I Want It All" is a song by British rock band Queen, featured on their 1989 studio album, The Miracle. Written by guitarist and vocalist Brian May (but credited to Queen) and produced by David Richards, it was released as the first single from the album on 2 May 1989. "I Want It All" reached number three on the singles charts of the United Kingdom, Finland, Ireland and New Zealand, as well as on the US Billboard Album Rock Tracks chart. Elsewhere, it peaked at number two in the Netherlands and charted within the top 10 in Australia, Belgium, Germany, Norway and Switzerland. With its message about fighting for one's own goals it became an anti-apartheid protest song in South Africa.

The song was first played live on 20 April 1992, three years after its release, during The Freddie Mercury Tribute Concert, performed by the three remaining members of Queen, with Roger Daltrey of The Who singing lead vocals and Tony Iommi of Black Sabbath playing rhythm guitar. Freddie Mercury himself never performed the song live, as he died in November 1991 from AIDS at the age of 45, and his final performance with Queen was at the end of The Magic Tour, at Knebworth Park on 9 August 1986. The record is sung mainly by Mercury, with May singing backing vocals on the choruses and a solo-and-duet bit with Mercury on the middle eight.

== Background ==
The song, according to John Deacon, was one of only a few which was already written before the band entered the studio in the beginning of 1988 for what would become The Miracle album. According to May, it was the first song they did in the studio, recorded as a live band take without any drum machines or technology (except the sequencer section added later). The song was inspired by May's conflicted feelings after his breakup with his first wife, Christine Mullen, and his new relationship with Anita Dobson.

"I Want It All" is notably heavy and features themes relating to rebellion and social upheaval. Songwriter May, however, claims that it is about having ambitions and fighting for one's own goals; because of this, the song became an anti-apartheid song in South Africa and has also been used as a gay rights protest theme and a rallying anthem for Black American youth.

The song was a live favourite, and has been a fixture regularly performed on Queen's "Queen+" tours, both with Paul Rodgers and subsequently Adam Lambert.

== Versions ==
There are at least three different versions of the song. The album version included on The Miracle features an acoustic and electric guitar intro, leading into a power chord section and a brief solo, and later on a two-part main guitar solo, the first section played at the same tempo as the rest of the song, followed by a second, faster-paced section.

For its single release, the track was edited slightly. Most obviously, the instrumental intro was replaced with an a cappella rendition of the chorus, leading directly into May's first short guitar solo from the intro. The slower first section of the main guitar solo was also removed. As well as the various single releases, this version was also used in the music video and is found on the band's Greatest Hits II compilation.

A third version of the song was prepared especially for the Queen Rocks compilation. Essentially a hybrid of the previous versions, it features the a cappella intro of the single version and the full-length guitar solo of the album version.

== Critical reception ==
Upon its release as a single, pan-European magazine Music & Media described "I Want It All" as "pure, irresistible pomp" and a "definite hit". The reviewer added that it is "highly reminiscent of the time when Queen dominated the European charts with songs like 'We Are the Champions'". Jerry Smith of Music Week commented that Queen are "back with one of their typically pompous blockbusters". As a guest reviewer for Kerrang!, Chris DeGarmo of Queensrÿche commented, "I love those vocal tracks they use. I think it really developed, it took a little patience. I liked the nice shift in the middle of the song. It went into a blaze and then came back." In the US, Cash Box commented that Queen "returns with a bang, featuring their patented choir-like harmonies over a rocking, heavy track". They added that it "is no 'Bohemian Rhapsody', that's for sure, but more along the 'We Will Rock You' line" and said that it "should appeal to fans of '90s pop-metal."

In a review of The Miracle, Melville-based newspaper Newsday stated that "I Want It All" is "colored by May's rocking guitar rolls and Mercury's rough-boys vocals". The Dallas Morning News noted that it "starts off with a Bowiesque guitar part, picks up a heavy cargo of steel, quickly lays down the hard line implied by the title, then takes flight along Mr. May's greased fretboard". In a retrospective review for AllMusic, Greg Prato suggested that the song, like the title track "The Miracle", "reflect[s] on [...] the state of the world in the late '80s" and summarised the song stylistically as "heavy rock.

== Music video ==
The music video features the band performing in a studio that used halogen lighting. It was directed by David Mallet and filmed at Elstree Studios, Borehamwood in March 1989. In the Greatest Video Hits 2 DVD audio commentary, Brian May and Roger Taylor recall that Mercury's health was already quite bad when the video's shooting took place, and it was remarkable that it did not show up in the video, with Mercury performing with all the energy he had. The video also features Mercury's first public appearance with a beard to hide the kaposi's sarcoma marks on his jawline, after shaving off his trademark moustache during the video shoot for "The Great Pretender" in February 1987.

== Track listings ==
7-inch Single

- A Side. "I Want It All" (single version) – 4:01
- B Side. "Hang On in There" – 3:45

12-inch and CD single

- 1/A Side. "I Want It All" (single version) – 4:01
- 2/B1. "Hang On in There" – 3:45
- 3/B2. "I Want It All" (album version) – 4:41

== Personnel ==
- Freddie Mercury – lead and backing vocals, synthesizer
- Brian May – guitars, backing and co-lead vocals, programming
- Roger Taylor – drums, backing vocals, programming
- John Deacon – bass guitar

== Charts ==
=== Weekly charts ===
Chart (1989)	Peak position
Australia (ARIA)	10
Austria (Ö3 Austria Top 40)	11
Belgium (Ultratop 50 Flanders)	10
Canada Top Singles (RPM)	34
Europe (Eurochart Hot 100)	8
Finland (Suomen virallinen lista)	3
Ireland (IRMA)	3
Italy (Musica e dischi)	7
Italy Airplay (Music & Media)	11
Netherlands (Dutch Top 40)	2
Netherlands (Single Top 100)	2
New Zealand (Recorded Music NZ)	3
Norway (VG-lista)	4
Spain (AFYVE)	12
Sweden (Sverigetopplistan)	14
Switzerland (Schweizer Hitparade)	8
UK Singles (Official Charts)	3
US Billboard Hot 100	50
US Mainstream Rock (Billboard)	3
West Germany (GfK)	9

=== Year-end charts ===
Chart (1989)	Position
Australia (ARIA)	71
Belgium (Ultratop)	59
Europe (Eurochart Hot 100)	57
Netherlands (Dutch Top 40)	30
Netherlands (Single Top 100)	33
US Album Rock Tracks (Billboard)	39
West Germany (Media Control)	47

== Certifications ==
Region	Certification	Certified units/sales
Italy (FIMI)	Gold	25,000^{‡}
New Zealand (RMNZ)	Platinum	30,000^{‡}
Spain (Promusicae)	Gold	30,000^{‡}
United Kingdom (BPI)	Silver	200,000^{^}
United States (RIAA)	Gold	500,000^{‡}
^{^} Shipments figures based on certification alone.^{‡} Sales+streaming figures based on certification alone.

== Release history ==
Region	Date	Format(s)	Label(s)	Ref(s).
United Kingdom	2 May 1989	7-inch vinyl; 12-inch vinyl; CD; cassette	Parlophone	
Japan	14 June 1989	Mini-CD	EMI	

== Video game, film and TV appearances ==
- Madden NFL 12 – A mash-up rap version with "We Will Rock You" included is featured in Madden NFL 12. It features the rapping of Armaggedon, a former member of Terror Squad. This mash-up rap version of the song was also featured in the 2011 film Sucker Punch.
- SingStar Queen – The original version of the song was featured in the PlayStation karaoke music video game SingStar Queen.
- Guitar Hero series – The single version of the song was available as a playable track in the 2009 music video game Guitar Hero: Van Halen. The song was also featured in Guitar Hero Live.
- Rock Band series – The song was originally released as downloadable content on 20 October 2009, alongside a pack of other Queen songs. The song was later re-released as downloadable content for Rock Band 3 to support the new pro guitar and keyboard features.
- T-Mobile – The song appears in a 2020 TV commercial for T-Mobile.

The song was also used by the Toronto Blue Jays as their anthem for their 2025 postseason run.
