= Queen Rocks =

Compilation album by Queen
- Released: 3 November 1997
- Recorded: 1972–1997
- Genre: Hard rock
- Length: 70:21
- Labels: Parlophone; Hollywood

Queen chronology
Made in Heaven (1995)	Queen Rocks (1997)	The Crown Jewels (1998)

Singles from Queen Rocks
- 1. "No-One but You (Only the Good Die Young)" Released: 5 January 1998 (UK)

Professional ratings
Review scores
Source	Rating
AllMusic	3/5 stars
MusicHound Rock	3/5 stars
The Rolling Stone Album Guide	2.5/5 stars

Queen Rocks is a compilation album by the British rock band Queen, released on 3 November 1997.

== Content ==
The compilation is unique to the Queen catalogue, as it deliberately does not follow the standard "greatest hits" collection format and focuses on songs from Queen's heavier side. Some hits are present ("We Will Rock You", "I Want It All" and "Fat Bottomed Girls"), while other tracks included were never released as singles anywhere ("Put Out the Fire", "Tear It Up" and "Sheer Heart Attack").

The album also contains a remake of "I Can't Live With You", with a much louder and heavier guitar and more aggressive drumming, and one new track, "No-One but You (Only the Good Die Young)", which is a gentle ballad. The latter began life as a track for Brian May's solo album Another World (1998); the remaining members chose to record it as a bookend for their career as Queen. It was the last original studio recording from the 1990s featuring Brian May, Roger Taylor and John Deacon and is among the few Queen songs not to feature lead singer Freddie Mercury (other examples include "Good Company" and "Sleeping on the Sidewalk").

== Track listing ==
All tracks are written by Brian May, except where noted.

Side one
No.	Title	Writer(s)	Original album	Length
1.	"We Will Rock You"		News of the World, 1977	2:01
2.	"Tie Your Mother Down" (single version)		A Day at the Races, 1976	3:45
3.	"I Want It All" (hybrid album/single version)		The Miracle, 1989	4:30
4.	"Seven Seas of Rhye"	Freddie Mercury	Queen II, 1974	2:47
5.	"I Can't Live with You" (1997 Rocks Retake)		Innuendo, 1991	4:47

Side two
No.	Title	Writer(s)	Original album	Length
6.	"Hammer to Fall" (album version)		The Works, 1984	4:30
7.	"Stone Cold Crazy"	Mercury; May; Roger Taylor; John Deacon	Sheer Heart Attack, 1974	2:14
8.	"Now I'm Here"		Sheer Heart Attack, 1974	4:12
9.	"Fat Bottomed Girls" (album version)		Jazz, 1978	4:18
10.	"Keep Yourself Alive"		Queen, 1973	3:44

Side three
No.	Title	Writer(s)	Original album	Length
11.	"Tear It Up"		The Works, 1984	3:28
12.	"One Vision" (album version)	Taylor; Mercury; May; Deacon	A Kind of Magic, 1986	5:09
13.	"Sheer Heart Attack"	Taylor	News of the World, 1977	3:26
14.	"I'm in Love with My Car" (hybrid album/single version)	Taylor	A Night at the Opera, 1975	3:05

Side four
No.	Title	Original album	Length
15.	"Put Out the Fire"	Hot Space, 1982	3:20
16.	"Headlong"	Innuendo, 1991	4:33
17.	"It's Late"	News of the World, 1977	6:29
18.	"No-One but You (Only the Good Die Young)"	previously unreleased, 1997	4:11

== Video version ==
A video version of the album was made. It included slightly different videos for all these songs.

1. "I Want It All" (The original video, except for the fact that it uses clips from the 1986 Wembley concert.)
2. "We Will Rock You" (Uses clips of Queen singing at Wembley '86, Budapest '86, Montreal '81, Live Aid '85, Japan '79, Hammersmith '79, Houston '77, Buenos Aires '81, Rio '85, Milton Keynes '82, and the original video. Also uses outtakes from the original video.)
3. "Keep Yourself Alive" (Slightly modified 1992 DoRo video with clips from two original 1973 videos, and BBC version with footage from black/white movies.)
4. "Fat Bottomed Girls" (The original video, except intercut with "mud wrestling" footage)
5. "Sheer Heart Attack" (Rare video. Video includes clips of Queen performance at the Rainbow '74, Hammersmith '75, Earl's Court '77, Houston '77, Hammersmith '79, Buenos Aires '81, Wembley '86, and clips from other Queen videos including Under Pressure and Keep Yourself Alive.)
6. "I'm in Love with My Car" (Rare video. Video includes clips of Queen performing the song at Hammersmith '79, along with shots of zooming cars.)
7. "It's Late" (Rare video. Video includes clips of Queen performance at the Rainbow '74, Wembley '86, Milton Keynes '82, Hammersmith '75, Buenos Aires '81, Houston '77, Earl's Court '77, Japan '79, Rio '85, and clips from other Queen videos including "Keep Yourself Alive", "Princes of the Universe", "Killer Queen", "These Are the Days of Our Lives", and "The Miracle".)
8. "Tie Your Mother Down: Through the Years" (Clips from Japan '85, Wembley '86, Houston '77, Hammersmith '79, Earl’s Court '77, Rio '85, Budapest '86, Paris '79, Frankfurt '82, Montreal '81, and the Freddie Mercury Tribute Concert.)
9. "Seven Seas of Rhye" (Slightly modified 1992 DoRo video with footage from Tokyo '75 and Tokyo '85)
10. "Put Out the Fire" (Performance at Osaka '82 with clips from old black/white movies.)
11. "One Vision (extended)" (Original video with some never-before-seen footage.)
12. "Makings of No-One But You"

== Personnel ==
- Freddie Mercury – lead and backing vocals, handclaps, footstomps, synthesiser, piano, organ (except on "No-One but You (Only the Good Die Young)")
- Brian May – co-lead vocals on "No-One but You (Only the Good Die Young)", "I Want It All" (bridge), "Fat Bottomed Girls" (chorus), "Keep Yourself Alive" (bridge) and "Put Out The Fire" (falsetto at end of verses), backing vocals, electric and acoustic guitars, handclaps, footstomps, keyboards, piano, synthesiser, sampler, drum programming
- Roger Taylor – lead vocals on "I'm In Love With My Car", co-lead vocals on "No-One but You (Only the Good Die Young)", "Keep Yourself Alive" (bridge) and "Sheer Heart Attack", backing vocals, acoustic and electric drums, percussion, tambourine, cowbell, handclaps, footstomps, rhythm guitar, bass guitar on "Sheer Heart Attack"
- John Deacon – bass guitar, handclaps, footstomps (except on "Sheer Heart Attack")

=== Additional personnel ===
- David Richards – keyboards on "I Can't Live With You (1997 Rocks Retake)" and keyboard programming on "I Want It All"
- Fred Mandel – synthesiser on "Hammer to Fall"

== Charts ==
=== Weekly charts ===
Chart (1997)	Peak position
Austrian Albums (Ö3 Austria)	16
Dutch Albums (Album Top 100)	14
German Albums (Offizielle Top 100)	12
New Zealand Albums (RMNZ)	32
Scottish Albums (Official Charts)	17
Swedish Albums (Sverigetopplistan)	51
Swiss Albums (Schweizer Hitparade)	16
UK Albums (Official Charts)	7

=== Year-end charts ===
Chart (1997)	Position
UK Albums (OCC)	72

== Certifications ==
Region	Certification	Certified units/sales
Australia (ARIA)	Gold	35,000^{^}
Japan (RIAJ)	Gold	100,000^{^}
^{^} Shipments figures based on certification alone.
