= Scandal (song) =

1989 single by Queen

- Artwork for UK release

Single by Queen

from the album The Miracle
- B-side: "My Life Has Been Saved"
- Released: 9 October 1989
- Recorded: 1988
- Genre: Electro-rock
- Length: 4:43 (Album version); 6:23 (12" extended version)
- Label: Parlophone, EMI, Capitol
- Songwriters: Queen (Brian May)
- Producers: Queen and David Richards

Queen singles chronology
"The Invisible Man" (1989)	"Scandal" (1989)	"The Miracle" (1989)

Music video
- "Scandal" on YouTube

"Scandal" is a song by the British rock band Queen. It was released as the fourth single from their 1989 album The Miracle and peaked at No. 25 in the UK. The single was released in the United States but failed to chart.

== Composition ==
"Scandal", written by Brian May, but credited to Queen, is about the unwanted attention May and lead singer Freddie Mercury received from the press in the late 1980s, involving May's divorce from his first wife, Chrissie Mullen, and his relationship with actress Anita Dobson and growing media speculation about Mercury's health. Mercury was diagnosed with AIDS in April 1987; he did not reveal his condition until the day before his death in November 1991. However, changes in his appearance, particularly his weight loss and rather gaunt look, helped fuel speculation that he was seriously ill.

== Recording ==
May recorded the keyboards and guitars in one take. Mercury's vocal was also done in one take.

== Critical reception ==
Upon its release, pan-European magazine Music & Media described "Scandal" as a "medium-paced track with a catchy beat and a dramatic build up". Selina Webb of Music Week remarked that, while there were "no surprises here", Mercury's "turbo-whine is in fine fettle" and the band's backing has "lost nothing of its orchestral impact". William Shaw of Smash Hits called it "marvellous stuff" with its "thumping synths" and a "perky Brian May guitar bit". He added that, although the lyrics "deservedly lash the press for their tendency to make up fibs in their quest for smut, due to the sheer sensibleness of its theme, it lacks the usual over-the-topness that makes a good Queen single great".

Rebel MC and Michael Menson of Double Trouble, as guest reviewers for Number One, felt the song was more of an "album track" and one that was probably "rushed off the album" as a single. They concluded that chartwise it would "surface then sink like the Titanic". Phil Wilding of Kerrang! was negative in his review, calling it "such an unprecedented turd of a song that it's really not worth going on about". Muff Fitzgerald of Record Mirror was also critical, describing it as "terrible".

== Music video ==
The video for the song featured the band performing on a stage designed to look like a newspaper – it was filmed at Pinewood Studios on 27 September 1989.

In the audio commentary included with the video in Queen: Greatest Video Hits 2, drummer Roger Taylor admitted his dislike for it, stating it was "not one of my favourite songs. One of the most boring videos we ever made."

== B-sides ==
The original version of the song "My Life Has Been Saved" was featured on the B-Side of the single, before May, Taylor, Deacon and Richards reworked the track for their fifteenth and final studio album Made in Heaven. The 1995 version replaced the original guitar intro with keyboards played by bassist John Deacon. The 12" and CD singles include the extended version of "Scandal" on the A-Side, while the B-Sides are both "My Life Has Been Saved" and the album version of "Scandal".

== Track listings ==
7" single

1. "Scandal" (album version) – 4:43
2. "My Life Has Been Saved" – 3:15

12"/CD single

1. "Scandal" (extended version) – 6:23
2. "My Life Has Been Saved" – 3:15
3. "Scandal" (album version) – 4:43

== Personnel ==
- Freddie Mercury – vocals
- Brian May – guitars, keyboards
- Roger Taylor – drums, vibraslap
- John Deacon – bass guitar
- David Richards – synth bass, sampler

== Charts ==
Chart (1989)	Peak position
Australia (ARIA)	158
Belgium (Ultratop 50 Flanders)	29
Irish Singles Chart	14
Netherlands (Dutch Top 40)	16
Netherlands Singles Chart (Single Top 100)	12
UK Singles Chart	25

== Cover versions ==
- The Dutch symphonic metal band Delain covered the song on their album Moonbathers.
