= The Miracle (album) =

1989 album by Queen

Studio album by Queen
- Released: 22 May 1989
- Recorded: January 1988 – January 1989
- Studios: Olympic (London); Townhouse (London); Mountain (Montreux)
- Genres: Rock; pop
- Length: 41:22
- Labels: Parlophone; Capitol
- Producers: Queen; David Richards

Queen chronology
Live Magic (1986)	The Miracle (1989)	At the Beeb (1989)

Queen studio album chronology
A Kind of Magic (1986)	The Miracle (1989)	Innuendo (1991)

Singles from The Miracle
- 1. "I Want It All" Released: 2 May 1989; 2. "Breakthru" Released: 19 June 1989; 3. "The Invisible Man" Released: 7 August 1989 (UK only); 4. "Scandal" Released: 9 October 1989; 5. "The Miracle" Released: 27 November 1989 (UK only)

The Miracle is the thirteenth studio album by the British rock band Queen, released on 22 May 1989 by Parlophone and Capitol Records. The album was recorded following Brian May's marital problems and Freddie Mercury's HIV diagnosis in 1987. Recording started in January 1988 and lasted for an entire year. The album was originally going to be called The Invisible Men, but three weeks before the release, according to Roger Taylor, they changed the name to The Miracle. It was also the last Queen album with a photo of all four members on the front cover.

The album reached number one in the UK, Austria, Germany, the Netherlands, and Switzerland, and number 24 on the US Billboard Top Pop Albums chart. AllMusic would name The Miracle as Queen's best album of the 1980s, along with The Game.

== Songs ==
=== Side one ===
==== "Party" ====
"Party" began as a jam session between Freddie Mercury, Brian May and John Deacon. Mercury was at the piano and he started off the "we had a good night" section. From then on the three of them worked together and completed it. May sings lead on a small portion of the song near the beginning.

==== "Khashoggi's Ship" ====
"Khashoggi's Ship" was started by Mercury with all four band members contributing to the lyrics and music. The song is about famous billionaire Adnan Khashoggi and a ship (the Nabila, now Kingdom 5KR) that he owned at the time and was one of the largest private yachts in the world. On the album, this track segues from "Party", to which it has a very similar lyrical theme. The song served as the reference to the name of the Khashoggi character in the We Will Rock You musical.

==== "The Miracle" ====
"The Miracle" is one of the most complex songs from the band's later years. Mercury and Deacon co-wrote the chords together. It is one of May's favourite songs. The entire band contributed lyrical and some musical ideas, and Mercury played piano as well as many synth tracks, using a Korg M1 and a Roland D-50. The Collector's Edition includes an alternate version ("Original Take with John's Ending").

==== "I Want It All" ====
"I Want It All" was composed by May in 1987. On the "Greatest Video Hits II" DVD, May commented that the song was inspired by his second wife, Anita Dobson's, favourite motto, "I want it all, and I want it now!" The idea of having intro, verses, choruses and solos over the same chord progression was reused on their next album with another May song, "The Show Must Go On", from 1991. Mercury sang lead vocals for most of the song, but Mercury and May share lead vocals during the bridge. Mercury played keyboards, May played acoustic and electric guitars while Taylor used double-kick bass drums for the first (and only) time.

==== "The Invisible Man" ====
"The Invisible Man" is Taylor's first song on the album. The lyrical idea came from a book he was reading. May and Taylor commented (Queen for an Hour interview, 1989) that Taylor wrote part of the song in the bath (similarly to what happened with Mercury and "Crazy Little Thing Called Love" ten years before). Each of the four band members are name-checked in the vocals by Mercury throughout the course of the song: "Freddie Mercury" right before the first verse begins (done by Taylor), "John Deacon" after the first verse, "Brian May" (said twice) before his guitar solo, and "Roger Taylor" (with the initial "r" rolled by Mercury to sound like a drum roll) after the final chorus; Taylor "answers" with a drum fill. The demo version contains a completely different middle-eight with Mercury singing alternate lyrics in the style of Elvis Presley. The whispered parts of the chorus are sung by Taylor.

=== Side two ===
==== "Breakthru" ====
"Breakthru" is a combination of two songs: "When Love Breaks Up", by Mercury, and "Breakthru", written by Taylor with input by the others in the key change. Taylor's mid-1980s songs tended to be in flat keys, when he started writing at the piano instead of on a guitar. This song was released as a single and made the top ten in the UK over the summer of 1989. "When Love Breaks Up" was eventually released as part of the 2022 Collector's Edition.

==== "Rain Must Fall" ====
"Rain Must Fall" is a collaboration between Deacon (music) and Mercury (lyrics). Taylor recorded a lot of Latin percussion but most of that was edited out in order to have more space for vocal harmonies, guitars and keyboards, the latter shared between Mercury and Deacon in this piece.

==== "Scandal" ====
"Scandal" was written by May about the British press, in the wake of media-fuelled controversy about his recent divorce, his relationship with Anita Dobson, and Mercury's rare public appearances due to his battle with AIDS. May played keyboards and performed the guitar solo as a first take. Mercury's lead vocals were also a first take. Synth-bass is played by David Richards. May has since commented that the song is very close to his heart.

==== "My Baby Does Me" ====
"My Baby Does Me" is another collaboration of Mercury and Deacon. Both of them had the idea of a simpler track in order to ease off the album. In a Radio 1 interview in 1989, each of them claimed the other had constructed the bassline. The song was originally demoed as "My Baby Loves Me", but was rewritten to replace the word "loves" with "does" throughout.

==== "Was It All Worth It" ====
"Was It All Worth It" was composed by Mercury. The song harks back to the band's intricately produced sound in the 1970s. Though the bulk of the song was masterminded by Mercury, all members contributed ideas and lyrics (for example, Taylor contributed the line "we love you madly!"). Deacon later cited the song as his favourite on the album. Taylor uses a gong and timpani. Despite it not being released as a single, it remains hugely popular among the Queen fanbase.

=== Non-album tracks ===
==== "Hang on in There" ====
This song was initiated by Mercury, with lyrics that relate to his illness. The song's working title was "A Fiddly Jam". May plays both acoustic and electric guitars, as well as keyboards, a job he shared with Mercury, who also plays piano. The song originally appeared as the B-side to the "I Want It All" single.

==== "Chinese Torture" ====
The only CD track that did not appear on a single release. For the first time this track emerged during the last concerts of Queen's 1986 Magic Tour as part of May's guitar solo. He also included it in his solos when he was back on tour with Queen + Paul Rodgers in 2005 and 2006.

==== "Stealin'" ====
Principally composed by Mercury (though, as all other songs from these sessions, credited to the band as a whole), this song is a tongue-in-cheek representation of a man who spends his life committing robbery. The song is performed mainly through spoken words, but occasionally has lines sung. This song appeared in an edited form as the B-side to the "Breakthru" single.

==== "Hijack My Heart" ====
The song, credited to the band as an entity rather than one composer, was actually written by Taylor, who also provides lead vocals. It tells the story of a man who falls in love with a woman he meets, despite his original annoyance at her rudeness and mannerisms. It was the B-side to "The Invisible Man".

==== "My Life Has Been Saved" ====
Written by Deacon (originally as an acoustic track) about the state the world is in, this song was the B-side to "Scandal". A reworked version was later released on the 1995 Made in Heaven album.

=== Unreleased songs and demos ===
==== "Dog with a Bone" ====
This song was recorded in 1988 during the studio sessions of The Miracle album, but did not make the final album sequence. It was included in the 2022 box set The Miracle Collector's Edition in November 2022. A blues rock-style jam, it features lead vocals shared by Mercury and Taylor.

==== "Face It Alone" ====
"Face It Alone" was recorded during The Miracle sessions in 1988. The song was eventually released as a single on 13 October 2022. "Face It Alone" was written by all four members of Queen and was produced by David Richards, Kris Fredriksson and Justin Shirley-Smith. The song peaked at number 90 in the UK. An accompanying music video was released on October 21, 2022. The track was included on The Miracle Collector's Edition.

==== "You Know You Belong to Me" & "Water" & "I Guess We're All Falling Out" ====
All three Brian May compositions were included for the first time on The Miracle Collector's Edition. Only the last of these was worked on in the studio with May providing vocals for "You Know You Belong to Me" & "Water" and Mercury providing vocals for "I Guess We're All Falling Out".

== Artwork ==
The cover art was created by designer Richard Gray, utilising a chroma key and the Quantel Paintbox workstation, then state of the art image-manipulation technology, to combine photographs of the familiar faces of the four band members into one morphed gestalt image. This visual is in line with their decision to dispense with individual credits and simply present their music as the product of Queen; the back cover went a step further with a seamless regiment pattern of the band's eyes. May said in 2022 that nowadays, it could easily be made in Photoshop, but back then, the machinery required to produce the artwork was as big as a room and the process was very "enterprising" for its time.

== Singles ==
Five singles were released from the album, all in 1989:

- "I Want It All" was the lead single from the album, released in the UK on 2 May; it hit number three in the British charts but made it to number one in numerous other European countries. The song became an anti-apartheid anthem among youth in South Africa and also has been used to protest other causes. This well-known anthem has been heard as a rallying song for African youth. The song became Queen's first American rock radio hit since "Under Pressure" by peaking at number three on Billboard's Mainstream Rock Singles chart, but only reached number 50 on the Billboard Hot 100 Chart.
- "Breakthru" was the second single from the album released in the UK on 19 June; its video was filmed on a private steam train known as The Miracle Express. The single peaked at number seven in the UK, and was also released as a single in the US. Also appearing in the video is Debbie Leng, who was at the time Taylor's girlfriend.
- "The Invisible Man", released in the UK on 7 August, hit number 12 in the UK and was a hit throughout Europe; the video shows scores of computer-duplicated band members moving in unison. This song was later covered by American musician Scatman John.
- "Scandal" was the album's fourth single, and peaked at number 25 in the UK. It is a protest song about the way the tabloids dealt with May's relationship with Anita Dobson.
- "The Miracle" was the fifth and final single from the album, released on 27 November in the UK, reaching number 21 on the British charts. Its video involves young Queen lookalikes (including a then-unknown Ross McCall) who perform a Queen-style stage show. The real band appear only at the end jamming with their younger counterparts.

== Critical reception ==
Professional ratings
Review scores
Source	Rating
AllMusic	3.5/5 stars
Chicago Tribune	1/4 stars
Encyclopedia of Popular Music	2/5 stars
MusicHound Rock	2.5/5 stars
NME	6/10
Q	4/5 stars
Record Mirror	5/5 stars
Rolling Stone	2/5 stars
The Rolling Stone Album Guide	2/5 stars

The Sun-Sentinel wrote "With Freddie Mercury in vintage light-operatic form, here's an album (like so many of Queen's others) that should be used as a pop music how-to for aspirants. Combining the forces of rock, pop, metal, clever melodies and cunning stylisations, The Miracle never lets down. From one track to the next there is, as usual, no telling which way this band will go, affording even the most jaded ear a challenge."

Newsday (Melville, NY) wrote "On The Miracle, Mercury's voice is steady and solid, May's runs are as flashy and supple as ever. Most of the 10 songs, written collaboratively by the four members, stick pretty much to the band's formula of mini-suites: edgy pop with tempos that change half-way into the number and some delicious hooks."

Rolling Stone stated "The Miracle is a showcase for Freddie Mercury and his love of sweeping, quasi-operatic vocals. And indeed, Mercury – especially on the title track – has never sounded better... Only on a few tracks ("Khashoggi's Ship" and "Was It All Worth It") does May really let it rip, and when he does, it's like the old Queen peeping out for just a moment and then turning tail... At least The Miracle offers little snippets of Queen's former majesty."

AllMusic stated "The Miracle packs quite a sonic punch, recalling the rich sounds of their past classics (1976's A Day at the Races, etc.). Split 50/50 between pop and heavy rock, the album was another global smash. Along with The Game, The Miracle is Queen's strongest album of the '80s."

== Track listing ==
All tracks credited to Queen. All lead vocals by Freddie Mercury unless noted. The primary writers are mentioned below.

Side one
No.	Title	Writer(s)	Lead vocals	Length
1.	"Party"	Freddie Mercury; Brian May; John Deacon	Mercury with Brian May	2:24
2.	"Khashoggi's Ship"	Mercury; May; Deacon; Roger Taylor		2:47
3.	"The Miracle"	Mercury; Deacon		5:02
4.	"I Want It All"	May	Mercury with May	4:41
5.	"The Invisible Man"	Taylor	Mercury with Roger Taylor	3:55

Side two
No.	Title	Writer(s)	Length
6.	"Breakthru"	Mercury; Taylor	4:08
7.	"Rain Must Fall"	Mercury; Deacon	4:20
8.	"Scandal"	May	4:42
9.	"My Baby Does Me"	Mercury; Deacon	3:22
10.	"Was It All Worth It"	Mercury	5:45
Total length:			41:22

- Sides one and two were combined as tracks 1–10 on the CD release.

Extra tracks (1989 Parlophone/Capitol CD)
No.	Title	Writer(s)	Length
11.	"Hang On in There" (B-side to "I Want It All")	Mercury; May; Deacon; Taylor	3:46
12.	"Chinese Torture" (Non-album instrumental track)	May	1:46
13.	"The Invisible Man" (12" version)	Taylor	5:28
Total length:			51:42

Bonus tracks (1991 Hollywood Records CD reissue)
No.	Title	Writer(s)	Length
11.	"Hang On in There" (B-side to "I Want It All")	Mercury; May; Deacon; Taylor	3:46
12.	"Chinese Torture" (Non-album instrumental track)	May	1:46
13.	"The Invisible Man" (12" version)	Taylor	5:28
14.	"Scandal" (12" mix)	May	6:34
Total length:			58:16

Disc 2: Bonus EP (2011 Universal Music CD reissue)
No.	Title	Writer(s)	Length
1.	"I Want It All" (Single version)	May	4:01
2.	"The Invisible Man" (Demo version with guide vocal, August 1988)	Taylor	5:04
3.	"Hang on in There" (B-side to "I Want It All")	Queen	3:46
4.	"Hijack My Heart" (B-side to "The Invisible Man")	Taylor	4:13
5.	"Stealin'" (B-side to "Breakthru")	Mercury	4:01
6.	"Chinese Torture" (Non-album instrumental track)	May	1:46
7.	"The Invisible Man" (12" version)	Taylor	5:28
Total length:			28:19

Bonus videos (2011 iTunes deluxe edition)
No.	Title	Length
8.	"I Want It All" (Promo video)	4:40
9.	"The Making of The Miracle" (Mini documentary)	8:22
10.	"The Making of The Miracle album cover" (Mini documentary)	5:00
Total length:		46:21

== Personnel ==
Track numbering refers to CD and digital releases of the album.

Queen

- Freddie Mercury – lead vocals (all tracks), backing vocals (all but 5), keyboards (1–4, 6, 7, 9, 10), drum machine (1), piano (1, 3, 6)
- Brian May – electric guitar (all tracks), backing vocals (1, 3, 4, 6, 9, 10), keyboards (8, 10), acoustic guitar (4), co-lead vocals (1, 4)
- Roger Taylor – drums (all but 9), backing vocals (1, 3–6, 10), percussion (2, 3, 8, 10), lead vocals ("Hijack My Heart"), drum machine (1, 7, 9), keyboards (5, 6), electric guitar (5), co-lead vocals (5)
- John Deacon – bass guitar (all tracks), electric guitar (1, 5, 7, 9), keyboards (7, 9)

Additional personnel

- David Richards – keyboards (4–6), sampler (8), engineering
- Assistant engineers – Andrew Bradfield, John Brough, Angelique Cooper, Claude Frider, Andy Mason, Justin Shirley-Smith
- Mastered by Kevin Metcalf and Gordon Vickary
- Computer programming by Brian Zellis
- Album sleeve design by Richard Gray
- Original photography by Simon Fowler

== 2022 box set reissue ==
The Miracle Collector's Edition

Box set by Queen
- Released: 18 November 2022
- Recorded: January 1988 – January 1989; 2022 (pitch corrections)
- Studios: Olympic (London); Townhouse (London); Mountain (Montreux)
- Genres: Rock; pop
- Labels: EMI, Hollywood
- Producer: Queen

Queen chronology
Greatest Hits in Japan (2020)	The Miracle Collector's Edition (2022)	Queen I Collector's Edition (2024)

Singles from The Miracle Collector's Edition
- 1. "Face It Alone" Released: 13 October 2022

In October 2022, Queen announced plans for a November 18 reissue of the album, featuring six unreleased tracks, four featuring Mercury as the lead vocalist. Queen said that the eight-disc collection contains alternate takes, demos, and radio interviews.

As part of the announcement, Queen released the previously unheard song "Face It Alone". "We did find a little gem from Freddie, that we'd kind of forgotten about," Taylor said of the track. "It's wonderful, a real discovery. It's a very passionate piece."

Of the song, May said:

"It was kind of hiding in plain sight. We looked at it many times and thought, oh no, we can't really rescue that. But in fact, we went in there again and our wonderful engineering team went, 'OK, we can do this and this.' It's like kind of stitching bits together... but it's beautiful, it's touching."

The other unreleased tracks are "When Love Breaks Up" (Mercury), "You Know You Belong to Me" (May), "Dog with a Bone" (Taylor), "Water" (May) and "I Guess We're Falling Out" (May).

=== Track listing ===
All lead vocals by Freddie Mercury unless noted.

==== Vinyl ====
Side one: Long Lost Original LP Cut
No.	Title	Writer(s)	Lead vocals	Length
1.	"Party"	Freddie Mercury; Brian May; John Deacon	Mercury with Brian May	2:24
2.	"Khashoggi's Ship"	Mercury; May; Deacon; Roger Taylor		2:47
3.	"The Miracle"	Mercury; Deacon		5:02
4.	"I Want It All"	May	Mercury with May	4:41
5.	"Too Much Love Will Kill You"	May; Frank Musker; Elizabeth Lamers		4:20
6.	"The Invisible Man"	Taylor	Mercury with Roger Taylor	3:55

Side two
No.	Title	Writer(s)	Length
7.	"Breakthru"	Mercury; Taylor	4:08
8.	"Rain Must Fall"	Mercury; Deacon	4:20
9.	"Scandal"	May	4:42
10.	"My Baby Does Me"	Mercury; Deacon	3:22
11.	"Was It All Worth It"	Mercury	5:45
Total length:			45:42

==== CD ====
Disc one: The Miracle (Remastered by Bob Ludwig)
No.	Title	Writer(s)	Lead vocals	Length
1.	"Party"	Mercury; May; Deacon	Mercury with May	2:24
2.	"Khashoggi's Ship"	Mercury; May; Deacon; Taylor		2:47
3.	"The Miracle"	Mercury; Deacon		5:02
4.	"I Want It All"	May	Mercury with May	4:41
5.	"The Invisible Man"	Taylor	Mercury with Taylor	3:55
6.	"Breakthru"	Mercury; Taylor		4:08
7.	"Rain Must Fall"	Mercury; Deacon		4:20
8.	"Scandal"	May		4:42
9.	"My Baby Does Me"	Mercury; Deacon		3:22
10.	"Was It All Worth It"	Mercury		5:45
Total length:				41:22

Disc two: The Miracle Sessions
No.	Title	Writer(s)	Lead vocals	Length
1.	"Party" (Original Take)	Mercury; May; Deacon	Mercury with May	2:53
2.	"Khashoggi's Ship" (Original Take)	Mercury; May; Deacon; Taylor		3:07
3.	"The Miracle" (Original Take with John's Ending)	Mercury; Deacon		4:45
4.	"I Want It All" (Original Take)	May	Mercury with May	6:15
5.	"The Invisible Man" (Early Version with Guide Vocal)	Taylor	Mercury with Taylor	5:03
6.	"When Love Breaks Up" (Demo)	Mercury		1:43
7.	"Breakthru" (Real Drums and Bass)	Taylor		4:58
8.	"Rain Must Fall" (Demo)	Mercury; Deacon		2:41
9.	"Scandal" (Original Rough Mix)	May		4:39
10.	"My Baby Loves Me"	Mercury; Deacon		4:08
11.	"Was It All Worth It" (Original Take)	Mercury		5:02
12.	"You Know You Belong to Me"	May	May	1:53
13.	"I Guess We're Falling Out" (Demo)	May		3:42
14.	"Dog with a Bone"	Taylor	Mercury with Taylor	3:48
15.	"Water" (Demo)	May	May	1:51
16.	"Face It Alone"	Mercury; May; Taylor; Deacon	Mercury	4:07
Total length:				1:00:35

Disc three: Alternative Miracle (Extended Mixes and B-Sides)
No.	Title	Writer(s)	Lead vocals	Length
1.	"I Want It All" (Single Version)	May	Mercury with May	4:01
2.	"Hang on in There" (B-side to "I Want It All")	Mercury; May; Deacon; Taylor		3:46
3.	"Breakthru" (12" version)	Mercury; Taylor		5:44
4.	"Stealin'" (B-side to "Breakthru")	Mercury		3:59
5.	"The Invisible Man" (12" version)	Taylor		5:28
6.	"Hijack My Heart" (B-side to "The Invisible Man")	Taylor	Taylor	4:12
7.	"Scandal" (12" Mix)	May		6:35
8.	"My Life Has Been Saved" (B-side to "Scandal")	Deacon		3:16
9.	"Stone Cold Crazy" (Live at the Rainbow Theatre, November 1974/ B-side to "The Miracle")	Mercury; May; Taylor; Deacon		2:10
10.	"My Melancholy Blues" (Live in Houston, December 1977/ B-side to "The Miracle")	Mercury		3:50
11.	"Chinese Torture" (Instrumental track)	May		1:44
Total length:				44:46

Disc four: Miracu-mentals (Instrumentals & Backing Tracks)
No.	Title	Writer(s)	Length
1.	"Party" (Instrumental)	Mercury; May; Deacon	2:24
2.	"Khashoggi's Ship" (Backing Track)	Mercury; May; Deacon; Taylor	2:47
3.	"The Miracle" (Backing Track)	Mercury; Deacon	5:02
4.	"I Want It All" (Backing Track)	May	4:41
5.	"The Invisible Man" (Backing Track)	Taylor	3:55
6.	"Breakthru" (Backing Track)	Mercury; Taylor	4:08
7.	"Rain Must Fall" (Backing Track)	Mercury; Deacon	4:20
8.	"Scandal" (Backing Track)	May	4:42
9.	"My Baby Does Me" (Backing Track)	Mercury; Deacon	3:22
10.	"Was It All Worth It" (Backing Track)	Mercury	5:45
Total length:			41:22

Disc five: The Miracle Radio Interviews
No.	Title	Length
1.	"Queen for an Hour" (Trailer)
2.	"Queen for an Hour" (Interview)
3.	"Queen for an Hour" (Out-takes)
4.	"Rockline" (Programme)

==== Blu-ray/DVD ====
The Miracle Videos
No.	Title	Length
1.	"I Want It All" (Promotional Music Videos)
2.	"Breakthru" (Promotional Music Videos)
3.	"The Invisible Man" (Promotional Music Videos)
4.	"Scandal" (Promotional Music Videos)
5.	"The Miracle" (Promotional Music Videos)
6.	"The Miracle Interviews"
7.	"The Making of The Miracle Videos"
8.	"The Making of The Miracle Album Cover"

== Charts ==
=== Weekly charts ===
1989 weekly chart performance for The Miracle
Chart (1989)	Peak position
Australian Albums (ARIA)	4
Austrian Albums (Ö3 Austria)	1
Canada Top Albums/CDs (RPM)	19
Dutch Albums (Album Top 100)	1
Finnish Albums (The Official Finnish Charts)	1
French Albums (SNEP)	11
German Albums (Offizielle Top 100)	1
Italian Albums (Musica e Dischi)	3
Japanese Albums (Oricon)	23
New Zealand Albums (RMNZ)	2
Norwegian Albums (VG-lista)	2
Spanish Albums (PROMUSICAE)	4
Swedish Albums (Sverigetopplistan)	6
Swiss Albums (Schweizer Hitparade)	1
UK Albums (Official Charts)	1
US Billboard 200	24
US Top Compact Disks (Billboard)	9

1992 weekly chart performance for The Miracle
Chart (1992)	Peak position
Hungarian Albums (MAHASZ)	36

2019 weekly chart performance for The Miracle
Chart (2019)	Peak position
Belgian Albums (Ultratop Wallonia)	192

2022 weekly chart performance for The Miracle
Chart (2022)	Peak position
Belgian Albums (Ultratop Flanders)	21
Belgian Albums (Ultratop Wallonia)	13
German Albums (Offizielle Top 100)	2
Hungarian Albums (MAHASZ)	20
Irish Albums (IRMA)	55
Italian Albums (FIMI)	20
Japanese Albums (Oricon)	17
Japanese Combined Albums (Oricon)	36
Japanese Hot Albums (Billboard Japan)	21
Polish Albums (ZPAV)	22
Portuguese Albums (AFP)	8
Scottish Albums (Official Charts)	6
Spanish Albums (Promusicae)	30
UK Albums (Official Charts)	6

=== Year-end charts ===
1989 year-end chart performance for The Miracle
Chart (1989)	Position
Austrian Albums (Ö3 Austria)	12
Canadian Albums (RPM)	66
Dutch Albums (Album Top 100)	5
German Albums (Offizielle Top 100)	9
New Zealand Albums (RMNZ)	28
Swiss Albums (Schweizer Hitparade)	6
UK Albums (OCC)	14

== Certifications and sales ==
Certifications and sales for The Miracle
Region	Certification	Certified units/sales
Australia (ARIA)	Gold	35,000^{^}
Austria (IFPI Austria)	Gold	25,000^{*}
Finland (Musiikkituottajat)	Gold	43,130
France (SNEP)	Gold	100,000^{*}
Germany (BVMI)	Platinum	500,000^{^}
Italy	—	150,000
Netherlands (NVPI)	Platinum	100,000^{^}
New Zealand (RMNZ)	Gold	7,500^{^}
Poland (ZPAV) 2009 Agora SA album reissue	Platinum	20,000^{*}
Spain (Promusicae)	Platinum	100,000^{^}
Switzerland (IFPI Switzerland)	Platinum	50,000^{^}
United Kingdom (BPI)	Platinum	500,000
Summaries
Europe	—	2,000,000
^{*} Sales figures based on certification alone.^{^} Shipments figures based on certification alone.
