= Face It Alone =

Single by Queen

from the album The Miracle Collector's Edition
- Released: 13 October 2022
- Recorded: 1988; 2022 (pitch corrections)
- Genre: Soft rock; psychedelic rock
- Length: 4:07
- Label: EMI
- Songwriter(s): Queen
- Producer(s): David Richards; Queen; Kris Fredriksson; Justin Shirley-Smith; Joshua J. Macrae

Queen singles chronology
"We Are the Champions (Raw Session Version)" (2017)	"Face It Alone" (2022)	"Machines (or Back to Humans)" (2023)

Music video
- "Face It Alone" on YouTube

"Face It Alone" is a song by British rock band Queen. Written by Brian May, John Deacon, Roger Taylor and Freddie Mercury (credited as Queen) and produced by David Richards, Kris Fredriksson and Justin Shirley-Smith, recorded over thirty years prior to its eventual release, and originally thought "unsalvageable" by May and Taylor, it was released on 13 October 2022 as a single as part of promotion for The Miracle Collector's Edition box set, which itself was released on 18 November 2022.

== Background ==
Mercury and the rest of the band recorded "Face It Alone" in 1988 during the recording sessions for their 1989 album The Miracle. It was revisited during the recording sessions for Innuendo but was ultimately not included on either album. In summer 2022, Brian May and Roger Taylor leaked the news of the newly discovered song, and stated that the song had a good chance of being released (using the earlier recordings from The Miracle).

The final, officially released version of the song does not contain all of the lyrics present in the original takes, nor from Mercury's original handwritten lyrics. A verse beginning "But screaming out loud gets you nowhere in this world" as well as lines such as "and the Sun begins to loom" were cut from the eventual 2022 release. In addition to the unused lyrics, alternate guitar parts and an extended guitar solo were recorded, too.

The original 1988 recording that served as the basis for the official release has a running time of 5:18. Studio dialogue from Mercury, directed at May, can be heard at the beginning of this version. Many of the lyrics on this recording are incomplete and ad-libbed, as was typical of Mercury's writing style at this point in his career. This track has been known to collectors since the late 1990s and has leaked online multiple times since the mid 2000s.

== Music video ==
A lyric video was released on 13 October 2022. The official music video was uploaded on Queen's YouTube channel on 21 October. The music video features figures of the band along with footage of the sessions from The Miracle.

== Critical reception ==
Reviews for "Face It Alone" were generally positive. Neil McCormick, writing for The Telegraph, rated the song 4/5 stars and called it "tender, moving [and] defiant". In a review for The Guardian, Alexis Petridis gave the song 3/5 stars, adding that whilst he felt it was "not a bad song, [and] nor is it anything approaching a classic", he praised Mercury's vocals, calling "Face It Alone" "moving and slender, a minor footnote that manages to pack an emotional punch regardless". A subsequent review from Rolling Stone magazine felt the song fit "effortlessly" into the band's back catalogue.

== Chart performance ==
On the day of its digital release, "Face It Alone" became the most downloaded song in the world for five days in a row and topped the iTunes download charts in 21 countries. In the United Kingdom, the single peaked at number 4 on the UK Singles Downloads Chart, and at number 1 on the UK Physical Singles and Vinyl Singles charts. It debuted at number 90 on the main Singles Chart.

Placing on various charts around the world, the single peaked at number 7 on the US Hot Hard Rock Songs chart, number one on the Dutch Single Tip 100 chart,

"Face It Alone" was the 14th best-selling vinyl record of 2022 in the UK behind the Brilliant Adventure (1992–2001) box set by David Bowie and ahead of "Rock the Casbah" by the Clash.

== Personnel ==
Queen

- Freddie Mercury – lead and backing vocals, keyboards
- Brian May – guitars
- Roger Taylor – drums, percussion
- John Deacon – bass guitar

Production

- David Richards – producer, engineer
- Kris Fredriksson – producer, engineer, music supervisor
- Justin Shirley-Smith – producer, music supervisor
- Josh Macrae – producer, engineer
- Bob Ludwig – mastering engineer

== Charts ==
Chart performance for "Face It Alone"
Chart (2022)	Peak position
Belgium (Ultratop 50 Wallonia)	45
Canada Digital Song Sales (Billboard)	15
Global Excl. US (Billboard)	169
Hungary (Single Top 40)	12
Japan Hot Overseas (Billboard Japan)	13
Netherlands (Single Tip)	1
New Zealand Hot Singles (RMNZ)	17
South Korea BGM (Circle)	136
Sweden Heatseeker (Sverigetopplistan)	17
Switzerland (Schweizer Hitparade)	26
UK Singles (OCC)	90
US Digital Song Sales (Billboard)	36
US Hot Hard Rock Songs (Billboard)	7
US Rock Digital Song Sales (Billboard)	8
