= Need Your Loving Tonight =

- Japanese single picture sleeve

Single by Queen

from the album The Game
- B-side: "Rock It (Prime Jive)"
- Released: 18 November 1980 (US)
- Recorded: 1980
- Genre: Power pop; new wave
- Length: 2:49
- Label: Elektra
- Songwriter: John Deacon
- Producer: Queen

Queen singles chronology
"Another One Bites the Dust" (1980)	"Need Your Loving Tonight" (1980)	"Flash" (1980)

"Need Your Loving Tonight" is a song by the British rock band Queen, written by bassist John Deacon. It is the fourth track on the first side of their eight studio album The Game (1980) and the second song on the album by Deacon (the other being "Another One Bites the Dust"). It was released as a single in some countries in November 1980.

== Lyrics and music ==
The lyrics to "Need Your Loving Tonight" take the point of view of someone who is upset about losing his lover. Queen historian Georg Purvis explains that the lyrics give a "false optimistic slant to the end of a relationship" by having the singer insist that the split was mutual. Musician Benoît Clerc claims that the lyrics overuse the phrases "I love her" and "I love you." According to Clerc, the music is "driven by a simple and repetitive rhythm" that Deacon plays on acoustic guitar, which he plays on this song in addition to his normal bass guitar. Freddie Mercury sings the lead vocal in what music professor Nick Braae describes as his "sincere voice," where he primarily uses his chest voice but avoids a gravelly tone and sings at a generally lower volume.

The structure of the song is unusual. While the song generally follows a verse-refrain structure, the first verse contains a contrasting bridge-like section in the middle. Songs typically do not have a bridge that early, but several of Deacon's songs incorporate multiple bridges, "Spread Your Wings" being another example.

Producer Reinhold Mack obtained a snare drum sound on the song that Clerc describes as both "muffled and punchy." Mack described how he obtained this sound, stating "You don't mic the snare drum from an angle down toward it and one at the bottom. I just use one on the side." According to Ultimate Classic Rock critic Eduardo Rivadavia, Deacon plays acoustic rhythm guitar to soften the sharp angles [of the song] into a buttery-smooth arrangement, simultaneously suggesting his Beatles influences and the period's power-pop inspiration. "Need Your Loving Tonight" was one of the first Queen songs on which a reverb effect was applied to lead singer Freddie Mercury's vocal.

== Reception ==
Allmusic critic Stephen Thomas Erlewine felt that the band sounded like Boston on the song. Similarly, Queen FAQ author Daniel Ross claimed that it could "sit happily alongside Journey or Boston on a compilation album of driving anthems." Andrew Wild suggested that it was influenced by the Beatles as well as contemporary power pop songs such as Cheap Trick's "Surrender," Blondie's "Hanging on the Telephone" and The Knack's "My Sharona." Baltimore Sun critic Tom Basham said that it "incorporates a Cheap Trick sounding bass pattern and some tasty strumming to produce a pure pop sound that is as memorable as it is lightweight." Ultimate Classic Rock critic Eduardo Rivadavia rated the song as the 8th best song Deacon wrote for Queen and described the song as "infectious power pop." Classic Rock History critic Millie Zeiler rated it John Deacon's 7th best Queen song, saying that the song "came from the viewpoint of a heartbroken man who saw the end of his romantic relationship as a mutual decision" but was "partially in denial." Zeiler said that the touch of 1960s nostalgia in the music made the song special.

Rolling Stone critic Steve Pond regarded "Need Your Loving Tonight" as the best rock 'n' roll song on The Game, but complained that it "keeps tripping over its sluggish power chords." Clerc calls it a "pop-rock song par excellence" but claims that it is not among Deacon's greatest songwriting successes. Billboard claimed that the song has "the breezy energy of a 1960s pop song" and praised Brian May's "biting guitar work." Cash Box called it a "fine pop-oriented rocker." Record World called it a "pop rocker [that] celebrates young love with a pounding beat [and] guitar havoc."

"Need Your Loving Tonight" was released as a single in some countries as a follow-up to "Another One Bites the Dust" but did not match its predecessor's success, peaking at #44 on the Billboard Hot 100.

== Live performances ==
"Need Your Loving Tonight" was played frequently during The Game Tour in 1980 and then less frequently in 1981, but was not played live thereafter. Also during live performances of the song, Brian May and Roger Taylor sang backing vocals and Freddie Mercury played piano during Brian's guitar solo (both of which were absent in the studio version).

== Personnel ==
- Freddie Mercury – lead and backing vocals
- Brian May – electric guitar, backing vocals
- Roger Taylor – drums, backing vocals
- John Deacon – bass guitar, acoustic guitar
