= The Miracle (song) =

1989 single by Queen

- UK single picture sleeve

Single by Queen

from the album The Miracle
- B-side: "Stone Cold Crazy" (live); "My Melancholy Blues" (live)
- Released: 27 November 1989
- Genre: Progressive rock
- Length: 5:02 (album version); 4:24 (Classic Queen edit); 4:54 (Greatest Hits II edit)
- Label: Parlophone; Capitol
- Songwriters: Queen (Freddie Mercury and John Deacon)
- Producers: Queen; David Richards

Queen singles chronology
"Scandal" (1989)	"The Miracle" (1989)	"Innuendo" (1991)

Music video
- "The Miracle" on YouTube

"The Miracle" is the fifth and final single from Queen's 1989 studio album of the same name. It was composed by the entire band, though Freddie Mercury and John Deacon were the main writers. It was released as a single on 27 November 1989 and it was the band's final single release of the 1980s.

== Composition ==
The idea for the song came from Freddie Mercury and John Deacon, who wrote the basic chord structure for the song. All four contributed to the lyrics and musical ideas, and the song was still credited to the entire band because they had agreed to do so during the album recording, regardless of who had been the actual writer. While both Mercury and May regarded this as one of their favourites, Taylor said in the audio commentary of Greatest Video Hits II that although it was not a favourite of his, he respected it as "an incredibly complex track".

The song describes several of "God's creations, great and small", such as great buildings like the Golden Gate Bridge, the Taj Mahal and the Tower of Babel, all described as "miracles" in the song, yet the one miracle "we're all waiting for" is "peace on Earth and an end to war." The song also references well-known figures such as Captain Cook, Cain and Abel, and Jimi Hendrix.

== Release ==
The sleeve artwork for the single uses the album's artwork inverted with a hologram-like fashion. The B-sides of the single are live versions of the songs "Stone Cold Crazy" and "My Melancholy Blues" originally from the albums Sheer Heart Attack and News Of The World respectively. Specifically, Stone Cold Crazy comes from one of the two Rainbow shows that took place in November 1974, and My Melancholy Blues comes from the Houston show that took place in December of 1977.

== Critical reception ==
Upon its release as a single, pan-European magazine Music & Media described "The Miracle" as a "nicely textured, discreetly operatic, arty pop song, as only Queen can make". David Giles of Music Week felt that it "shows Mercury and co at their overblown best, with massed harmonies, guitar climaxes and effortlessly pompous lyrics". He added, "Dripping with melodrama, this is classic showbiz overdose."

Mick Mercer of Melody Maker commented that "miraculously enough, this isn't bad" and continued, "The usual drama and wraparound Hades, but there's a plethora of attractive pop bursts and May isn't allowed to be his usual squelch self." Phil Wilding of Kerrang! called it "dreadful" and was more enthusiastic about the "charismatic" B-side – the live version of "Stone Cold Crazy", recorded in 1974. He remarked, "Energetic, fuelled, and bloody frightening. Same band? Apparently so."

== Music video ==
The music video for the song features four young boys performing as Queen on stage: Paul Howard as Brian May, James Currie as John Deacon, Adam Gladdish as Roger Taylor, and a then-unknown Ross McCall as Freddie Mercury. Throughout the video, McCall appears as four different incarnations of Mercury: 1977 Freddie (long hair with a one-piece black and white Harlequin spandex leotard), 1978–1979 Freddie (leather pants and leather jacket), Live Aid 1985 Freddie (white tank top, Adidas shoes, jeans), and 1986 Freddie (yellow jacket with track pants).

The video, which Queen themselves appear only near the end, was filmed at Elstree Studios, Borehamwood in November 1989. According to Roger Taylor, Mercury joked about sending the boys out on tour instead of them because of how well they did in the video.

== Track listings ==
7-inch single

A. "The Miracle" – 5:02
B. "Stone Cold Crazy" (live at the Rainbow Theatre, November 1974) – 2:15

12-inch and CD single

1. "The Miracle" – 5:02
2. "Stone Cold Crazy" (live at the Rainbow Theatre, November 1974) – 2:15
3. "My Melancholy Blues" (live in Houston, December 1977) – 3:43

== Personnel ==
- Freddie Mercury – lead and backing vocals, piano, synthesizers
- Brian May – guitars, backing vocals
- Roger Taylor – drums, percussion, backing vocals
- John Deacon – bass guitar

== Charts ==
Chart (1989–1990)	Peak position
Australia (ARIA)	151
Belgium (Ultratop 50 Flanders)	28
Netherlands (Dutch Top 40)	20
Netherlands (Single Top 100)	16
Ireland (IRMA)	23
UK Singles (Official Charts)	21
West Germany (GfK)	78
