= The Game (Queen album) =

Studio album by Queen
- Released: 30 June 1980
- Recorded: June–July 1979; February–May 1980
- Studios: Musicland (Munich, Germany)
- Genres: Rock; funk rock; pop; disco; new wave
- Length: 35:42
- Labels: EMI; Elektra
- Producer: Queen

Queen chronology
Live Killers (1979)	The Game (1980)	Flash Gordon (1980)

Queen studio album chronology
Jazz (1978)	The Game (1980)	Flash Gordon (1980)

Singles from The Game
- 1. "Crazy Little Thing Called Love" Released: 12 October 1979; 2. "Save Me" Released: 25 January 1980; 3. "Play the Game" Released: 30 May 1980; 4. "Another One Bites the Dust" Released: 22 August 1980; 5. "Need Your Loving Tonight" Released: 18 November 1980 (US)

The Game is the eighth studio album by the British rock band Queen. It was released on 30 June 1980 by EMI Records in the UK and by Elektra Records in the United States. The album is the first by Queen to feature a synthesizer, specifically the Oberheim OB-X.

The Game features a different, more pop-oriented sound compared to its predecessor, Jazz (1978). As a result of this stylistic shift, it became the only Queen album to reach number one in the US Billboard 200, and it remains their best-selling studio album in the United States, with four million copies sold. Songs on the album include the rockabilly tribute "Crazy Little Thing Called Love", which became the band's first number-one single on the Billboard Hot 100, and the funk-inspired "Another One Bites the Dust", which was their second and final US number-one hit.

The album was reissued in May 2003 on DVD-Audio with Dolby 5.1 surround sound and DTS 5.1.

== Songs ==
=== Side one ===
==== "Play the Game" ====
"Play the Game" was written by Freddie Mercury. The song begins with a series of overlapping synthesizer sounds played on an Oberheim OB-X, signaling the band's acceptance of electronic instruments into what had previously been an explicitly "no synths" sonic approach. It was released as the album's third single on 30 May 1980, reaching No. 14 in the UK and No. 42 in the United States. The song was performed live until 1982.

==== "Dragon Attack" ====
"Dragon Attack" was written by Brian May and was featured as the B-side of the UK single release of "Another One Bites The Dust", due to its stylistic similarity as a funk rock song. It was performed live from 1980 to 1985. Two remixes of the track were scheduled to appear on the cancelled 1992 BASIC Queen Bootlegs album. The first, by Jack Benson and R.A.K., was included as a bonus track on 1991 reissues of The Game. The second was an instrumental remix by Dave Ogilvie.

==== "Another One Bites the Dust" ====
"Another One Bites the Dust" was written by John Deacon. The song, a funk and disco track, was released as a single at the suggestion of Michael Jackson, a fan of the band who attended their July 1980 concert at The Forum near Los Angeles. It quickly became a success, reaching No. 1 in the United States and several other countries, and No. 7 in the United Kingdom. It is Queen's best selling single, with sales of approximately 7 million copies worldwide. The song was performed live from 1980 until the band's final tour with Mercury in 1986. Portions of the song were included in a Queen medley performed by Extreme at The Freddie Mercury Tribute Concert in 1992.

==== "Need Your Loving Tonight" ====
"Need Your Loving Tonight" was written by Deacon. The song was released as a single in November 1980 and reached No. 44 in the United States. It was performed frequently during The Game Tour in 1980 and less frequently in 1981, but was not performed live thereafter.

==== "Crazy Little Thing Called Love" ====
"Crazy Little Thing Called Love" was written by Mercury as a tribute to Elvis Presley while he was relaxing in a bath at the Bayerischer Hof Hotel in Munich, where Queen were staying during the recording of The Game. The track was released as a single eight months before release of the album. It peaked at No. 2 in the United Kingdom in late 1979 and then No. 1 in Australia, Canada, Mexico, Netherlands, and the United States in early 1980. The song was performed live from 1979 to 1986, first during the Crazy Tour and later as part of Queen's set at Live Aid. In addition to playing guitar on the recording, Mercury also played guitar in live performances of the song.

=== Side two ===
==== "Rock It (Prime Jive)" ====
"Rock It (Prime Jive)" was written by Roger Taylor. The song begins with Mercury singing the intro and then Taylor sings the rest of the song. The song was only performed live in North and South America, and in Japan, during The Game and Hot Space Tours respectively.

==== "Don't Try Suicide" ====
"Don't Try Suicide" was written by Mercury, and is Mercury's third and final song on the album. The song has never been performed live. The song was the B-side on the American release of "Another One Bites the Dust". In 1992, DJ Muggs remixed the track for inclusion on the later cancelled BASIC Queen Bootlegs compilation.

==== "Sail Away Sweet Sister" ====
"Sail Away Sweet Sister (To the Sister I Never Had)" was written by May and features him on lead vocals. The bridge was sung by Mercury. The song was recorded in June/July 1979. It has never been performed live by Queen, but has been by Guns N' Roses and by Brian May himself during the Another World tour in 1998. The song was sampled by Das EFX on their 1998 track "Change" from the album Generation EFX. May said that Mercury played the piano riff.

The song has also been on compilation albums Deep Cuts, Volume 2 (1977–1982) and Queen Forever.

==== "Coming Soon" ====
"Coming Soon" was written by Taylor. Mercury and Taylor share lead vocals. The song had been started during the Jazz sessions.

==== "Save Me" ====
"Save Me" was written by May, in tribute to a friend whose marriage had recently ended. May played most of the instruments on the track including acoustic and electric guitars, piano and synthesizer. The song was performed live from 1979 to 1982. When live the song features a short piano entrance absent from the studio version. The song peaked at No. 11 in the UK Singles Chart.

== Artwork ==
The photo on the cover of the EMI CD is different from that originally used on the LP and cassette release, even though the Hollywood CD still has the original photo. The original photo (with Roger Taylor having folded arms and Brian May not having a hand resting upon his exposed hip) is shown in the article. This alternate photo was also used on the cover of the album in the Crown Jewels box set released in 1998, and on the DTS DVD-Audio edition of the album released in 2003.

== Reception ==
Professional ratings
Review scores
Source	Rating
AllMusic	4.5/5 stars
Chicago Tribune	2.5/4 stars
The Encyclopedia of Popular Music	3/5 stars
The Guardian	4/5 stars
MusicHound Rock	3/5 stars
Record Mirror	4/5 stars
The Rolling Stone Album Guide	3/5 stars
Smash Hits	3/10
Uncut	4/5 stars

Contemporary critical reception was mixed. Billboard notes that "The energy never flags, the music is expertly rendered throughout, and the effects and studio trickery are subtly handled". Cashbox believed that "While its high harmony, melodic heavy metal sound is unmistakable, each song on "The Game" has a totally different sound from the next." Record World in its Album Hits of the week said that "These artists do it all masterfully." on this album." For Record Mirror, Robin Smith wrote of the album, "It's like winning the men's singles at Wimbledon." Rolling Stone felt that it was "nice to hear a Queen album with songs, not 'anthems'," but opined that "these guys know how this music should sound and feel, but they can't bend enough to get with it." The Washington Post gave a scathing review, writing: "After five years of unchallenging, dismal albums, this was supposed to be Queen's comeback. But no such luck." Steve Taylor, writing for Smash Hits, was equally as dismissive, writing "sandwiched between two slabs of Queen's usual symphonic and/or choral pomp-rock [...] lies a filling of utterly unoriginal corn".

Creem readers voted The Game the seventh greatest album of 1980. At the Grammy Awards in 1981, Queen and Mack were nominated for Producer of the Year (Non-Classical) while "Another One Bites the Dust" was nominated for Best Rock Performance by a Duo or Group with Vocal. Queen received an American Music Award nomination for Favorite Pop/Rock Band/Duo/Group, while "Another One Bites the Dust" received the award for Favorite Pop/Rock Single.

In a retrospective review, AllMusic's Stephen Thomas Erlewine said that the album's "disco rock blends" showed a band that has "turned away from rock and toward pop", "turning decidedly, decisively pop, and it's a grand, state-of-the-art circa 1980 pop album that still stands as one of the band's most enjoyable records." AllMusic would go on to name The Game as Queen's best album of the 1980s. Evan Sawdey of PopMatters called The Game a "regular ol' rock album". In 2008, Out ranked the album number 28 of 100 in a poll of "more than 100 actors, comedians, musicians, writers, critics, performance artists, label reps, and DJs, asking each to list the ten albums that left the most indelible impressions on their lives."

=== Band appraisal ===
Yeah, that was when we started trying to get outside what was normal for us. Plus we had a new engineer in Mack and a new environment in Munich. Everything was different. We turned our whole studio technique around in a sense, because Mack had come from a different background from us. We thought there was only one way of doing things, like doing backing tracks: we would just do it until we got it right. If there were some bits where it speeded up or slowed down, then we would do it again until it was right. We had done some of our old backing tracks so many times, they were too stiff. Mack's first contribution was to say, "Well you don't have to do that. I can drop the whole thing in. If it breaks down after half a minute, then we can edit in and carry on if you just play along with the tempo". We laughed and said "Don't be silly. You can't do that". But in fact, you can. What you gain is the freshness, because often a lot of the backing tracks is first time though. It really helped a lot. There was less guitar on that album, but that's really not going to be the same forever; that was just an experiment.

— Brian May

== Track listing ==
All lead vocals by Freddie Mercury unless noted.

Side one
No.	Title	Writer(s)	Length
1.	"Play the Game"	Freddie Mercury	3:30
2.	"Dragon Attack"	Brian May	4:18
3.	"Another One Bites the Dust"	John Deacon	3:35
4.	"Need Your Loving Tonight"	Deacon	2:50
5.	"Crazy Little Thing Called Love"	Mercury	2:42

Side two
No.	Title	Writer(s)	Lead vocals	Length
6.	"Rock It (Prime Jive)"	Roger Taylor	Roger Taylor with Mercury	4:33
7.	"Don't Try Suicide"	Mercury		3:52
8.	"Sail Away Sweet Sister"	May	Brian May with Mercury	3:33
9.	"Coming Soon"	Taylor	Mercury with Taylor	2:51
10.	"Save Me"	May		3:48
Total length:				35:42

Bonus track (1991 Hollywood Records CD reissue)
No.	Title	Length
11.	"Dragon Attack" (1991 bonus remix by R.A.K. and Jack Benson)	4:19
Total length:		40:01

Disc 2: Bonus EP (2011 Universal Music CD reissue)
No.	Title	Writer(s)	Length
1.	"Save Me" (Live at the Montreal Forum, November 1981)		4:18
2.	"A Human Body" (B-side to "Play The Game")	Taylor	3:44
3.	"Sail Away Sweet Sister" (Take 1 with guide vocal, February 1980)		2:34
4.	"It's a Beautiful Day" (Original spontaneous idea, April 1980)	Mercury	1:31
5.	"Dragon Attack" (Live at the Milton Keynes Bowl, June 1982)		5:15
Total length:			17:22

Bonus videos (2011 iTunes deluxe edition)
No.	Title	Length
6.	"Vocal Improv/Dragon Attack" (Live at Morumbi Stadium, São Paulo, March 1981)	5:02
7.	"Save Me" (Live at Seibu Lions Stadium, Tokyo, November 1982)	3:56
8.	"Crazy Little Thing Called Love" (Saturday Night Live, September 1982)	3:58
Total length:		29:38

== Personnel ==
Queen

- Freddie Mercury – lead vocals (1–5, 7, 9, 10), co-lead vocals (6, 8), backing vocals (all tracks), piano (1, 7, 8), synthesiser (1), acoustic guitar (5)
- Brian May – electric guitar (all tracks), backing vocals (1, 2, 4–8, 10), acoustic guitar (7, 8, 10), synthesiser (8, 10), piano (10), lead vocals (8)
- Roger Taylor – drums (all tracks), backing vocals (all but 3), electric guitar (9), synthesiser (6, 9), lead vocals (6, "A Human Body"), co-lead vocals (9), percussion
- John Deacon – bass guitar (all tracks), electric guitar (3), acoustic guitar (4), piano (3)

Additional musician

- Mack – synthesiser (6, 10)

Production

- Queen – production, sleeve concept
- Reinhold Mack – co-production, engineering, mastering
- Allen Zentz – mastering
- Brian Gardener – mastering
- Cream – sleeve design
- Peter Hince – photography
- Christopher Hopper – photography

== Charts ==
=== Weekly charts ===
Chart (1980–1981)	Peak position
Argentina (CAPIF)	1
Australian Albums (Kent Music Report)	11
Austrian Albums (Ö3 Austria)	5
Canada Top Albums/CDs (RPM)	1
Dutch Albums (Album Top 100)	1
Finnish Albums (The Official Finnish Charts)	24
French Albums (SNEP)	17
German Albums (Offizielle Top 100)	2
Italian Albums (Musica e Dischi)	10
Japanese Albums (Oricon)	5
New Zealand Albums (RMNZ)	11
Norwegian Albums (VG-lista)	2
Spanish Albums (AFE)	13
Swedish Albums (Sverigetopplistan)	7
UK Albums (Official Charts)	1
US Billboard 200	1

Chart (2026)	Peak position
Greek Albums (IFPI)	63

=== Year-end charts ===
Chart (1980)	Position
Austrian Albums Chart	15
Canadian Albums Chart	14
Japanese Albums Chart (Oricon)	79
New Zealand Albums (RMNZ)	34
UK Albums Chart	46
Chart (1981)	Position
Canadian Albums Chart	44
US Billboard Year-End	55
Chart (2019)	Position
Icelandic Albums Chart	92

== Certifications and sales ==
Region	Certification	Certified units/sales
Argentina (CAPIF)	2× Platinum	120,000^{^}
Austria (IFPI Austria)	Gold	25,000^{*}
Brazil (Pro-Música Brasil)	Gold	130,000
Canada (Music Canada)	6× Platinum	600,000^{^}
Denmark (IFPI Danmark) original release	Silver	25,000
Denmark (IFPI Danmark) reissue	Platinum	20,000^{‡}
Germany (BVMI)	Gold	250,000^{^}
Italy (FIMI) sales since 2009	Gold	25,000^{‡}
Mexico (AMPROFON)	Gold	100,000^{^}
Netherlands (NVPI)	Gold	50,000^{^}
New Zealand (RMNZ)	Gold	7,500^{^}
Poland (ZPAV) 2008 Agora SA album reissue	Platinum	20,000^{*}
Spain (Promusicae)	Gold	50,000^{^}
United Kingdom (BPI)	Gold	100,000^{^}
United States (RIAA)	4× Platinum	4,000,000^{^}
^{*} Sales figures based on certification alone.^{^} Shipments figures based on certification alone.^{‡} Sales+streaming figures based on certification alone.
