= The Invisible Man (song) =

- Artwork for UK release

Single by Queen

from the album The Miracle
- B-side: "Hijack My Heart"
- Released: 7 August 1989
- Recorded: 1988
- Genre: Electro-funk; synth-pop
- Length: 3:57 (album version); 5:04 (early version with guide vocal); 4:17 (video version); 5:28 (12" extended version)
- Label: Parlophone; EMI
- Songwriters: Queen (Roger Taylor)
- Producers: Queen; David Richards

Queen singles chronology
"Breakthru" (1989)	"The Invisible Man" (1989)	"Scandal" (1989)

Music video
- "The Invisible Man" on YouTube

"The Invisible Man" is a song by the British rock band Queen, written by drummer Roger Taylor but credited to Queen. The song is sung mostly by Freddie Mercury, with vocal contributions from Taylor. The song was released in August 1989 as the third single from the band's album The Miracle. Taylor said that he got the inspiration to create the song while reading a book, and the bassline instantly came to his imagination. The song title was inspired by the H. G. Wells novel of the same name.

This song contains a distinction whereby all four band members' names are mentioned in the lyrics. The first being Freddie Mercury, followed by John Deacon. Brian May's name is then said twice (just before his guitar solo starts), and while saying "Roger Taylor", the first "r" is rolled to emulate the drums at the end of the verse. Mercury's name is announced by Taylor, and the other three by Mercury.

== Critical reception ==
Upon its release as a single, David Giles of Music Week described "The Invisible Man" as a "somewhat watered-down effort to create a modern dancefloor frenzy [that] is enhanced by a Brian May guitar solo". Ian Broudie, as guest reviewer for Number One, rated the song two out of five stars and said that "aside from a good rhythm this doesn't have much going for it". Kerrang! wrote, "Yes, it has no substance, you can see straight through it. No, of course it won't flop, it's bound to be a hit."

== Music video ==
In the music video, a video game called "The Invisible Man" plays a large part, as a young boy is playing a game while the band (all dressed in black) are the "bad guys" and Freddie Mercury (who wears a pair of virtual reality goggles, while the rest of the band wear black shades instead) enters the real world and performs the song in his room. As they perform, the boy tries to shoot them with the game controller.

Mercury appears in various places in the child's room, vanishing before the boy can shoot him with the video controller. After Mercury emerges from the child's closet with his band in tow, John Deacon removes his cowboy hat and throws it to the floor. In perhaps a futile attempt to emulate him, the boy removes his baseball cap, and dons the other. The screen then shows an image of the band in the game once more, Deacon without a hat, and the child walks underneath them, with a "Game Over" message appearing.

A then-15-year-old Danniella Westbrook, who joined soap opera EastEnders the following year, appears in the video as the boy's sister.

Freddie Mercury's eyewear and John Deacon's cowboy hat were also used in the cover of their next single "Scandal".

== Track listings ==
7" single

A. "The Invisible Man" (album version) – 3:57
B. "Hijack My Heart" – 4:11

12"/CD single

1/A. "The Invisible Man" (extended version) – 5:28
2/B1. "Hijack My Heart" – 4:11
3/B2. "The Invisible Man" (album version) – 3:57

== Personnel ==
- Freddie Mercury – lead vocals
- Brian May – lead guitar
- Roger Taylor – drums, synthesizer, sampler, electric guitar, backing vocals, co-lead vocals
- John Deacon – bass guitar, rhythm guitar
- David Richards – synthesizer, sequencer, programming

== Charts ==
=== Weekly charts ===
Chart (1989)	Peak position
Australia (ARIA)	118
Belgium (Ultratop 50 Flanders)	13
Ireland (IRMA)	10
Italy (Musica e Dischi)	14
Italy Airplay (Music & Media)	4
Netherlands (Dutch Top 40)	4
Netherlands (Single Top 100)	6
New Zealand (Recorded Music NZ)	15
Switzerland (Schweizer Hitparade)	30
UK Singles (Official Charts)	12
West Germany (GfK)	31

=== Year-end charts ===
Chart (1989)	Position
Belgium (Ultratop Flanders)	98
Netherlands (Dutch Top 40)	72
Netherlands (Single Top 100)	57
