= Breakthru (song) =

1989 single by Queen

- Artwork for UK release

Single by Queen

from the album The Miracle
- B-side: "Stealin'"
- Released: 19 June 1989
- Recorded: January 1988 – January 1989
- Genre: Power pop; pop
- Length: 4:08 (Album version); 5:45 (12" extended version)
- Label: Parlophone, EMI, Capitol
- Songwriters: Queen (Freddie Mercury and Roger Taylor)
- Producers: Queen and David Richards

Queen singles chronology
| "I Want It All" (1989) | "Breakthru" (1989) | "The Invisible Man" (1989) |

Music video
- "Breakthru" on YouTube

"Breakthru" is a song by the British rock band Queen. Written by Freddie Mercury and Roger Taylor but credited to Queen, it was released in June 1989 from the album The Miracle. The single reached number seven in the UK, and peaked at number 6 in the Netherlands and Ireland, but failed to chart in the US. The song is notable for its video where the group is performing the song on an open platform of a fast-moving steam train.

== Song ==
The album version of the song begins with 30 seconds of slow vocal harmony. It was apparently written by Freddie Mercury for a different song which ended up never being released, "When Love Breaks Up". It then abruptly changes to a fast-paced rocker, that was written by Roger Taylor. Other song versions were created by either extending or cutting the introduction. On the Queen for an Hour interview conducted in 1989, Mercury said that this was a great example of two separate bits coming together to make a final track. He commented on how the band had about 30 tracks to work with and only completed a handful, working on all of them at least somewhat.

== Critical reception ==
Upon its release as a single, pan-European magazine Music & Media praised "Breakthru" as "up-tempo, basic, highly effective and expertly constructed pop of the very highest quality". Based on the "first three or four piano-festooned seconds", Mike Soutar of Smash Hits was optimistic that the song "might be a classic of the 'We Are the Champions'/'Bohemian Rhapsody' mould". However, he felt that the song then "degenerates into a bit of a turgid plod in which Queen entirely neglect to insert a chorus [and] Mercury striv[es] to drown out everyone else".

Tim Nicholson of Record Mirror called it "as pompous as you could possibly imagine a record to be, times 17". Phil Wilding of Kerrang! was negative in his review, writing, "For a living legend this is a bit shitty. Whatever happened to Queen?"

== Video ==
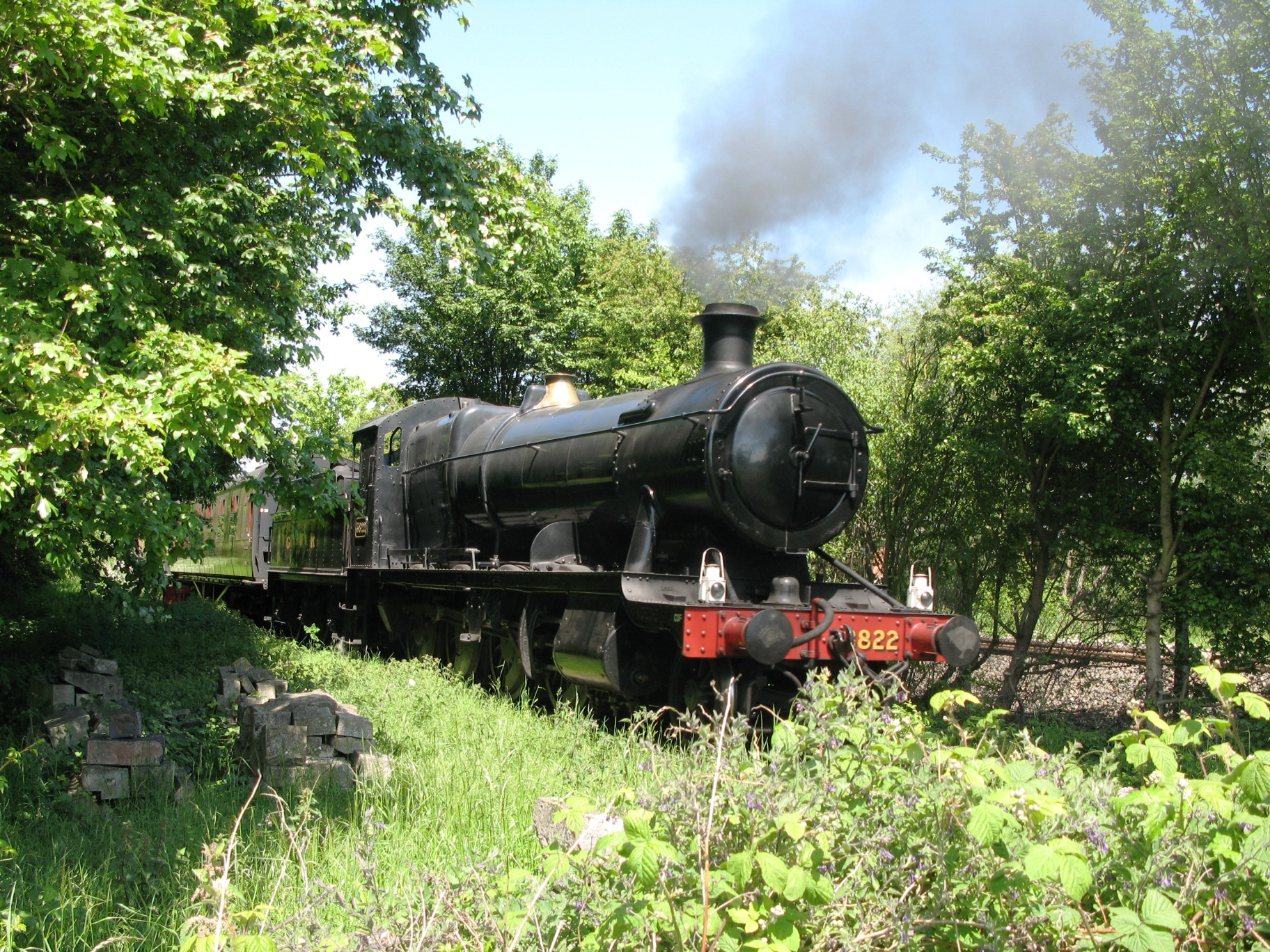
A regular (demonstration) run of loco 3822 along Didcot Railway Centre's main demonstration line.

The video of the song was filmed within two days in June 1989 on the preserved Nene Valley Railway, near Peterborough in Cambridgeshire, England. The group members mentioned in the interviews that despite the hot summer weather, the event brought a nice refreshment to their studio work. It also helped heighten guitarist Brian May's spirits, as he was going through a bout of depression from the intense scrutiny surrounding his first marriage and Freddie Mercury's health starting to falter as a result of AIDS.

The steam locomotive No. 3822 (fired by Mark Needham) and an open flatbed were rented by Queen from the Didcot Railway Centre in Oxfordshire and repainted for the video. In particular, the group named the train "The Miracle Express", and this name was reflected in large red letters on the sides of the locomotive.

The idea of using a train in the video was suggested by Taylor and was inspired by the rhythm of the rapid part of the song. During the introduction ("new life is born"), the video features Taylor's then-girlfriend Debbie Leng, with a black mask painted around her eyes, waking up and getting up on the rail track. The commencing of the fast part coincides with the scene of the train breaking through a polystyrene wall painted as a brick wall; the wall was constructed in a tunnel, under an arch of a stone bridge. The group was dissatisfied with this part because polystyrene could not stand the enormous air pressure buildup in the tunnel from the incoming train and the wall started breaking before the physical impact. The rest of the clip mostly shows the moving train with an attached open platform whereon the group performs the song.

May, Deacon and Taylor are playing guitars and drums, whereas Mercury is moving around the whole platform with his trademark bottomless microphone stand while singing. Leng appears in some scenes on the platform and further in the clip. The train was reportedly going at a speed of between 30 and 60 mph (intermediate values were mentioned in interviews), and thus the group insured itself for £2 million against bodily damage. The entire clip cost £300,000 to make, closer to £780,000 as of March 2025.

== Queen comments on the record ==
It's the prime example what we were talking about before, I mean, the track "Breakthru" sort of stemmed from Roger, really, it's basically his track. But the sort of a capella vocal bit in front was from someone else, as we've said: we have 30 tracks, and that was a little piece that I thought was quite good, and I didn't want it to go amiss, and I just said, 'Oh, well, we'll just put it in front of "Breakthru".' It's basically another song, sort of seem to go away quite nicely, so, we just snipped it.

— Freddie Mercury

I very much like the track, this is a Roger track, full of energy, and the track speaking lyrically is about breaking through to the next part of your life.

— Brian May

== Track listings ==
7" Single

A Side. "Breakthru" (Album Version) – 4:08

B Side. "Stealin'" – 3:58

12"/CD Single

1/A Side. "Breakthru" (Extended Version) – 5:45

2/B1. "Stealin'" – 3:58

3/B2. "Breakthru" (Album Version) – 4:08

== Personnel ==
Queen

- Freddie Mercury – lead and backing vocals, piano, keyboards
- Brian May – guitars, backing vocals
- Roger Taylor – drums, keyboards, backing vocals
- John Deacon – bass guitar

Additional

- David Richards – keyboards, synth bass, programming

== Distribution ==
The single was distributed in 1989 as 7-inch and 12-inch records, 5-inch CDs and tapes, with a Parlophone label in most countries. The label was from Capitol in the US. The B-side either contained the song "Stealin'", was only used as an addition to "Breakthru", or was blank as in some UK 12" records. Other 12" records and 5" CDs contained two versions of "Breakthru" and one of "Stealin'". Most covers contained a photomorph of four heads of the group members; the faces were merged at one eye of each face creating a five-eyed merged face. A strip showing eyes only was cut of this picture for most covers.

The song was included into the following albums and compilations: The Miracle, Greatest Hits II, The Platinum Collection, Box of Tricks, Greatest Video Hits 2 (disk 1), Greatest Flix II (VHS) and Queen: The eYe (electronic video game released in 1998 by Electronic Arts).

== Charts ==
| Chart (1989) | Peak position |
|---|---|
| Australia (ARIA) | 45 |
| Belgium (Ultratop 50 Flanders) | 10 |
| Canadian Singles Chart | 80 |
| Finland (Suomen Virallinen) | 10 |
| German Singles Chart | 24 |
| Ireland (IRMA) | 6 |
| Italy (Musica e Dischi) | 15 |
| Netherlands (Dutch Top 40) | 4 |
| Netherlands (Single Top 100) | 6 |
| New Zealand (Recorded Music NZ) | 45 |
| Switzerland (Schweizer Hitparade) | 28 |
| UK Singles Chart | 6 |
