= Live at Wembley '86 =

Live album by Queen
- Released: 26 May 1992
- Recorded: 12 July 1986; September 1986 (overdubs)
- Venues: Wembley Stadium, London, England
- Genre: Rock
- Length: 110:53
- Labels: EMI/Parlophone; Hollywood (US)
- Producer: Queen

Queen chronology
Classic Queen (1992)	Live at Wembley '86 (1992)	The 12″ Collection (1992)

Singles from Live at Wembley '86
- 1. "We Will Rock You / We Are the Champions" Released: June 1992 (EU)

Professional ratings
Review scores
Source	Rating
AllMusic	3.5/5 stars
MusicHound Rock	4/5 stars
The Rolling Stone Album Guide	3/5 stars
VideoVista	9/10 stars

Live at Wembley '86 is a double live album by the British rock band Queen. It was recorded live on Saturday 12 July 1986 during the Magic Tour at Wembley Stadium in London, England. The album was released on 26 May 1992, with a companion DVD released in June 2003.

The album was remastered and re-released with bonus tracks in August 2003 in the US as Live at Wembley Stadium after the companion DVD. This name has also been used on subsequent releases elsewhere, although they lack the bonus tracks included with the US version.

A remastered special edition DVD was released on 5 September 2011 in the UK (what would have been Freddie Mercury's 65th birthday), and for the first time included the Friday evening concert in addition to the Saturday night show. Snippets of the Friday show were included on earlier DVDs, but the remastered release marked the first time that the concert has been presented in full. A Deluxe Edition also included the Saturday concert in remastered CD form.

== Track listing ==
=== Disc one ===
No.	Title	Writer(s)	Length
1.	"One Vision"	Roger Taylor; Freddie Mercury; Brian May; John Deacon	5:50
2.	"Tie Your Mother Down"	May	3:52
3.	"In the Lap of the Gods... Revisited"	Mercury	2:44
4.	"Seven Seas of Rhye"	Mercury	1:19
5.	"Tear It Up" (with "Liar" Intro)	May (Liar intro written by Mercury)	2:12
6.	"A Kind of Magic"	Taylor	8:41
7.	"Under Pressure"	Taylor; Mercury; David Bowie; Deacon; May	3:41
8.	"Another One Bites the Dust"	Deacon	4:54
9.	"Who Wants to Live Forever"	May	5:16
10.	"I Want to Break Free"	Deacon	3:34
11.	"Impromptu"	Mercury; May; Taylor; Deacon	2:55
12.	"Brighton Rock" (Guitar Solo)	May	9:11
13.	"Now I'm Here"	May	6:19
Total length:			1:00:28

=== Disc two ===
No.	Title	Writer(s)	Length
1.	"Love of My Life"	Mercury	4:47
2.	"Is This the World We Created...?"	Mercury; May	2:59
3.	"(You're So Square) Baby I Don't Care"	Jerry Leiber; Mike Stoller	1:34
4.	"Hello Mary Lou"	Gene Pitney; Cayet Mangiaracina	1:24
5.	"Tutti Frutti"	Richard Penniman; Dorothy LaBostrie	3:23
6.	"Gimme Some Lovin"	Steve Winwood; Spencer Davis; Muff Winwood	0:55
7.	"Bohemian Rhapsody"	Mercury	5:50
8.	"Hammer to Fall"	May	5:36
9.	"Crazy Little Thing Called Love"	Mercury	6:27
10.	"Big Spender"	Dorothy Fields; Cy Coleman	1:07
11.	"Radio Ga Ga"	Taylor	5:57
12.	"We Will Rock You"	May	2:46
13.	"Friends Will Be Friends"	Mercury; Deacon	2:08
14.	"We Are the Champions"	Mercury	4:05
15.	"God Save the Queen"	Traditional (arr. May)	1:27
Total length:			50:25

== Bonus tracks on 2003 Hollywood Records remaster ==
1. "A Kind of Magic (Live 11 July 1986 at Wembley Stadium, London)"
2. "Another One Bites the Dust (Live 11 July 1986 at Wembley Stadium, London)"
3. "Crazy Little Thing Called Love (Live 11 July 1986 at Wembley Stadium, London)"
4. "Tavaszi szél vízet áraszt (Live 27 July 1986 at Népstadion, Budapest, Hungary)"

== The original Saturday concert ==
The original Saturday concert started at 4.00pm with tickets costing £14.50. Four bands performed in the following order:

1. INXS
2. The Alarm
3. Status Quo
4. Queen

== Charts ==
=== Weekly charts ===
Chart (1992)	Peak position
Australian Albums (ARIA)	96
Austrian Albums (Ö3 Austria)	6
Dutch Albums (Album Top 100)	12
Finnish Albums (Suomen Virallinen)	17
German Albums (Offizielle Top 100)	20
Hungarian Albums (MAHASZ)	13
New Zealand Albums (RMNZ)	3
Portuguese Albums (AFP)	1
Swedish Albums (Sverigetopplistan)	29
Swiss Albums (Schweizer Hitparade)	6
UK Albums (Official Charts)	2
US Billboard 200	53

Chart (2005–06)	Peak position
French Albums (SNEP)	126
Irish Albums (IRMA)	91
Italian Albums (FIMI)	13
Spanish Albums (Promusicae)	14

Chart (2020)	Peak position
Portuguese Albums (AFP)	37

=== Year-end charts ===
Chart (1992)	Position
Austrian Albums (Ö3 Austria)	32
Dutch Albums (Album Top 100)	53
German Albums (Offizielle Top 100)	92
New Zealand Albums (RMNZ)	37
Chart (2006)	Position
UK Albums (OCC)	167

== Certifications and sales ==
Music Album
Region	Certification	Certified units/sales
Brazil (Pro-Música Brasil)	Gold	100,000^{*}
France (SNEP)	Platinum	300,000^{*}
Germany (BVMI)	Gold	250,000^{^}
Netherlands (NVPI)	Gold	50,000^{^}
New Zealand (RMNZ)	Gold	7,500^{^}
Spain (Promusicae)	Platinum	100,000^{^}
Switzerland (IFPI Switzerland)	Gold	25,000^{^}
United Kingdom (BPI)	Platinum	300,000^{*}
United States (RIAA)	Platinum	1,000,000^{^}
^{*} Sales figures based on certification alone.^{^} Shipments figures based on certification alone.

Video Album
Region	Certification	Certified units/sales
Australia (ARIA)	2× Platinum	30,000^{^}
Austria (IFPI Austria)	Gold	5,000^{*}
Germany (BVMI)	4× Platinum	200,000^{^}
Italy	—	15,000
Mexico (AMPROFON)	Platinum	20,000^{^}
Portugal (AFP)	11× Platinum	88,000^{^}
United States (RIAA)	5× Platinum	500,000^{^}
^{*} Sales figures based on certification alone.^{^} Shipments figures based on certification alone.

== Personnel ==
Queen

- Freddie Mercury – lead vocals, piano, guitar on "Crazy Little Thing Called Love"
- Brian May – guitars, keyboards, backing vocals, co-lead vocals in "Hello Mary Lou" and "One Vision"
- Roger Taylor – drums, percussion, backing vocals, co-lead vocals in "Hello Mary Lou", "Tutti Frutti" and "Under Pressure"
- John Deacon – bass guitars, backing vocals

Additional musicians

- Spike Edney – keyboards, piano, guitar on "Hammer to Fall", backing vocals
