= List of Queen concert tours =

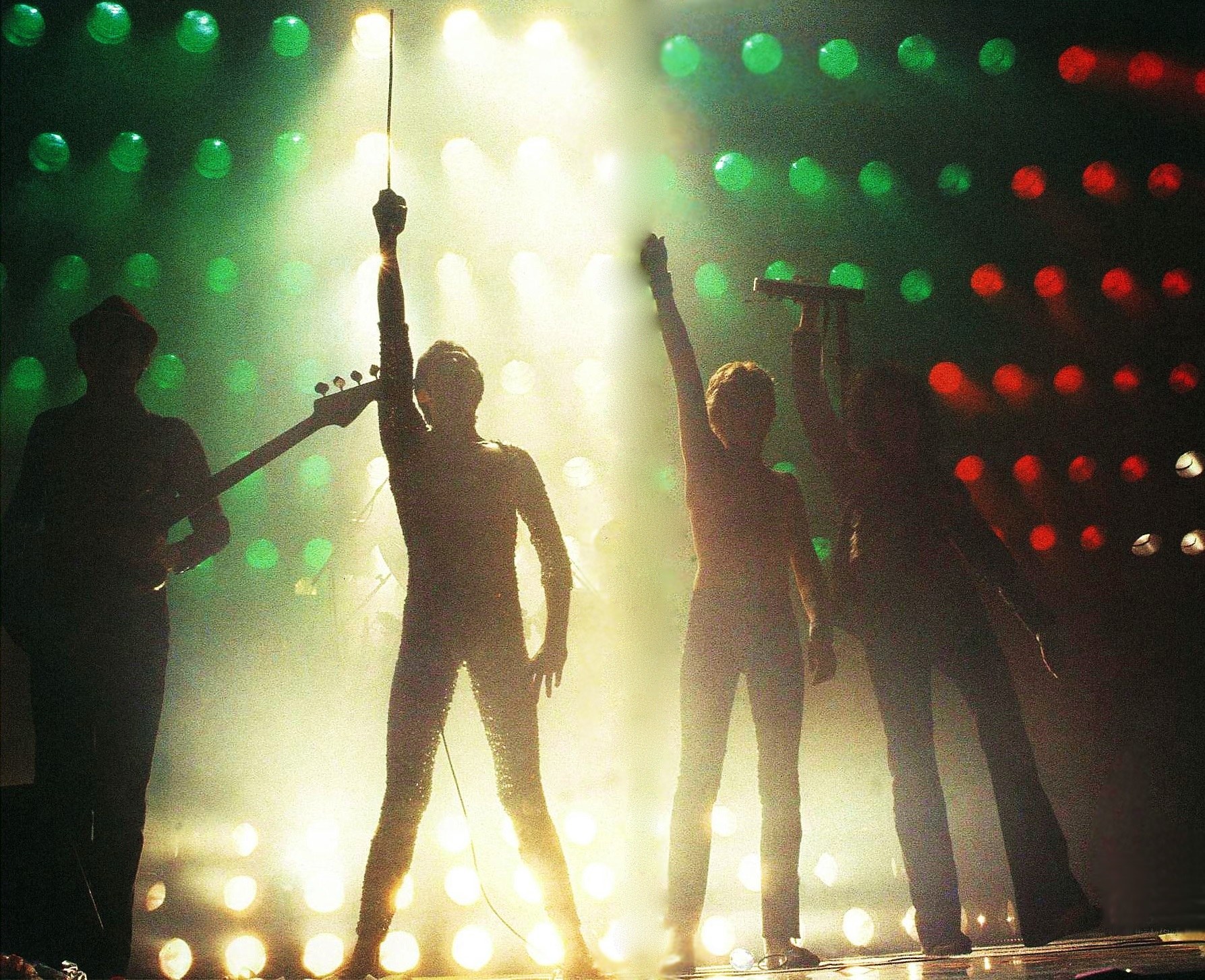
Queen live at Tokyo, 24 April 1979

The British rock band Queen were well known for their diverse music style in contemporary rock. Their large sound systems, lighting rigs, innovative pyrotechnics and extravagant costumes often gave shows a theatrical nature. Artists such as Bob Geldof, George Michael, David Bowie, Michael Jackson and Robbie Williams have expressed admiration for lead singer Freddie Mercury's stage presence.

Queen wrote certain songs, such as "We Will Rock You" and "We Are the Champions", with the goal of audience participation. "Radio Ga Ga" came to inspire synchronized hand-clapping (this routine, originating from the song's video, was the invention of the video's director, David Mallet). This influenced Queen's appearance at Live Aid, where the 72,000-person crowd at Wembley Stadium would sing loudly and clap their hands in unison. Queen's performance at Live Aid was later voted the greatest live show of all time by a group of over 60 musicians, critics, and executives in a poll conducted by Channel 4.

== 1970s ==
Queen played approximately 700 live performances during their career with roughly two-thirds during the 1970s. Their early performances were generally hard rock, but the band developed a noticeably more pop-oriented sound in later years. Many of their future trademarks first appeared in these early shows, although some could be traced back to the members' previous bands and artistic outlets (e.g., Smile, Ibex later renamed as Wreckage, and Sour Milk Sea).

Freddie Mercury often dressed in a flamboyant manner and acted with camp, while dry ice and multi-coloured lights were used. During the concerts, it was typical for both Brian May and Roger Taylor to have impromptu, instrumental interludes and for Mercury to engage in a crowd 'shout-along' whereas it was traditional for Taylor to sing one song. Brian May and John Deacon sang backup vocals. Other distinguishable trademarks were Mercury's microphone, which featured only the upper part of the stand with no base (which allegedly came about while Mercury was with "Wreckage" during which the bottom of his stand accidentally broke off), a grand piano, and May's hand-built electric guitar, the Red Special. The lengthy guitar solo by May showcased his use of a multiple-delay effect, helping create a layered atmosphere. Rarely, Queen would host a non-member on stage with them, the most notable being keyboardist Spike Edney who performed with the band during the 1980s. A semi-informal medley of 1950s rock 'n' roll songs (especially "Big Spender" and "Jailhouse Rock") was also a staple and usually formed the backbone of an encore. The band's logo, designed by Mercury shortly before the release of the first album, is made up of the band's star signs and was usually displayed on the front of Taylor's bass drum during their early tours. Some stage costumes worn by Mercury and May on their earliest tours and a few subsequent tours were created by fashion designer Zandra Rhodes.

The concert duration and set-list for each Queen show progressed significantly during its career, eventually leading to shows exceeding two hours. Queen performed most of the songs released on their studio albums during concerts. So far, two shows have been officially released as concert videos from this era, which are the November 1974 show at the Rainbow and the Christmas Eve 1975 show at the Hammersmith Odeon.

Lisa Marie Presley stated that the first rock concert she attended was by Queen in Los Angeles in the late 70s. After the show, she gave Mercury a scarf that belonged to her late father.

With the release of their first two albums Queen & Queen II, the band began live performing in earnest, essentially following the traditional 'album-tour' cycle throughout the 70s. The embryonic Queen played numerous gigs in and around London in the early seventies, but evidence suggests that its first performance was on 27 June 1970 at Truro in England. The year 1974 had started with their first trip outside of Europe and an appearance at the Sunbury Music Festival in Australia on 27 January.

=== Documented Gigs Between 1970 and 1973 ===
Date	Town/ City	Country	Venue	Ref.
Europe
27 June 1970	Truro	England	Truro City Hall	
18 July 1970	London	England	Imperial College	
25 July 1970	Truro	England	PJ’s Club	
23 August 1970 (Note: First of 13 concerts featuring Barry Mitchell on bass.)	London	England	Imperial College	
4 September 1970	London	England	Swiss Cottage Private School	
16 October 1970	London	England	The College of Estate Management	
22 October 1970	Derby	England	Clouds Club	
23 October 1970	London	England	Potter's Bar Youth Club	
30 October 1970	St Helens	England	College of Technology	
14 November 1970	Hertford	England	Balls Park College	
27 November 1970	Liverpool	England	The Cavern Club	
28 November 1970	Liverpool	England	The Cavern Club	
5 December 1970	Egham	England	Shoreditch College	
10 December 1970	London	England	Byam Shaw School of Art	
18 December 1970	St Helens	England	College of Technology	
19 December 1970	St Helens	England	Congregational Church Hall	
8 January 1971	London	England	Marquee Club	
9 January 1971 (Note: Supporting Kevin Ayers and The Whole World.)	Ewell	England	Technical College	
19 February 1971 (Note: First of 2 concerts featuring Doug Bogie on bass.)	London	England	Hornsey Town Hall	
20 February 1971 (Note: Supporting the band, Yes.)	London	England	Kingston Polytechnic College	
2 July 1971 (Note: First concert to feature John Deacon on bass.)	Redhill	England	Surrey College	
11 July 1971 (Note: Private gig for guests from record labels.)	London	England	Imperial College	
17 July 1971 (Note: Start of an 11 date tour of Cornwall.)	Penzance	England	The Garden	
19 July 1971	Hayle	England	Rugby Club	
24 July 1971	Wadebridge	England	Wadebridge Town Hall	
29 July 1971 (Note: Supporting the band, Warm Dust.)	Penzance	England	The Garden	
31 July 1971	Truro	England	Truro City Hall	
2 August 1971	Hayle	England	Rugby Club	
9 August 1971	St Agnes	England	Driftwood Spars	
12 August 1971	Truro	England	Tregye Hotel	
14 August 1971	RNAS Culdrose	England	Warrant Officer and Senior Rates Mess	
17 August 1971 (Note: Supporting the band, East of Eden.)	Truro	England	Truro City Hall	
21 August 1971 (Note: Part of the Carnon Downs Festival.)	Truro	England	Tregye Country Club	
6 October 1971	London	England	Imperial College	
2 December 1971	Epsom	England	Swimming Baths	
31 December 1971	Twickenham	England	Rugby Club	
28 January 1972	Bedford	England	Bedford College	
10 March 1972	London	England	King's College Medical School	
24 March 1972	London	England	Forest Hill Hospital	
6 November 1972	London	England	Pheasantry Club	
20 December 1972	London	England	Marquee Club	
9 April 1973	London	England	Marquee Club	
13 July 1973	Basingstoke	England	Queen Mary College	
23 July 1973	London	England	Marquee Club	
3 August 1973 (Note: Supporting the band, Vinegar Joe.)	Newcastle	England	The Mayfair	
17 August 1973	Peterborough	England	Peterborough Town Hall	
13 September 1973	London	England	Golders Green Hippodrome	
13 October 1973	Bonn	West Germany	Underground	
14 October 1973	Luxembourg	Luxembourg	Le Blow Up	
2 November 1973	London	England	Imperial College	
6 December 1973	Cheltenham	England	Cheltenham College	
7 December 1973	Cheltenham	England	Shaftesbury Hall	
8 December 1973	Liverpool	England	University of Liverpool	
15 December 1973	Leicester	England	University of Leicester	
21 December 1973	Taunton	England	County Ballroom	
28 December 1973 (Note: Supporting the band, 10cc.)	Liverpool	England	Top Rank Club	

=== Supporting Tour ===
==== Queen Tour ====
Title	Dates	Album	Continents	Shows	Band	Supporting
Queen Tour	12 November - 14 December 1973	Queen	Europe	21	Queen	Mott The Hoople

The band's first major step toward becoming a recognized live act came when Queen was a support act to Mott the Hoople on its 1973 UK tour. Queen's performances consistently received an enthusiastic reception from audiences.

===== Tour dates =====
Date	City	Country	Venue
Europe
12 November 1973	Leeds	England	Leeds Town Hall
13 November 1973	Blackburn	England	King George's Hall
15 November 1973	Worcester	England	Gaumont
16 November 1973	Lancaster	England	Lancaster University
17 November 1973	Liverpool	England	Stadium
18 November 1973	Hanley	England	Victoria Hall
19 November 1973	Wolverhampton	England	Wolverhampton Civic Hall
20 November 1973	Oxford	England	New Theatre
21 November 1973	Preston	England	Preston Guild Hall
22 November 1973	Newcastle	England	Newcastle City Hall
23 November 1973	Glasgow	Scotland	The Apollo
25 November 1973	Edinburgh	Scotland	Caley Picture House
26 November 1973	Manchester	England	Opera House
27 November 1973	Birmingham	England	Birmingham Town Hall
28 November 1973	Swansea	Wales	Brangwyn Hall
29 November 1973	Bristol	England	Colston Hall
30 November 1973	Bournemouth	England	Winter Gardens
1 December 1973	Southend-on-Sea	England	The Kursaal
2 December 1973	Chatham	England	Chatham Central Hall
14 December 1973 (Note: The band performed two shows on this date.)	London	England	Hammersmith Odeon

==== Queen II (US) Tour ====
Title	Dates	Album	Continents	Shows	Band	Supporting
Queen II (US) Tour	16 April - 11 May 1974	Queen II	North America	18	Queen	Mott The Hoople

Mott the Hoople decided to invite Queen to be its support act for Hoople's US tour as well. Here, the band was able to hone its on-stage presentations in front of large crowds, try out different songs and arrangements, and gain experience with state-of-the-art light and sound systems. The Queen song "Now I'm Here" was written by Brian May as a tribute to Mott The Hoople. They embarked on their first trip to the USA. Once again, beginning a four-week tour starting from April. The band paid more attention to their look on stage and employed the services of Zandra Rhodes to design some of their costumes, such as Freddie Mercury and Brian May's white and black wingsuits. Queen's supporting stint came to an abrupt halt, however, when May collapsed from hepatitis after the New York show on 11 May, and they all had to fly home so that he could recover.

===== Tour dates =====
Date	City	Country	Venue
North America
16 April 1974	Denver	United States	Regis College Fieldhouse
17 April 1974	Kansas City	United States	Memorial Hall
18 April 1974	St. Louis	United States	Kiel Auditorium
19 April 1974	Oklahoma City	United States	State Fair Arena
20 April 1974	Memphis	United States	Mid-South Coliseum
21 April 1974	Chalmette	United States	St. Bernard Civic Auditorium
27 April 1974	Providence	United States	Palace Concert Theatre
28 April 1974	Portland	United States	Exposition Hall
1 May 1974	Harrisburg	United States	State Farm Show Arena
2 May 1974	Allentown	United States	Agricultural Hall
3 May 1974	Wilkes-Barre	United States	King's College
4 May 1974	Waterbury	United States	Palace Theatre
7 May 1974	New York City	United States	Uris Theatre
8 May 1974	New York City	United States	Uris Theatre
9 May 1974	New York City	United States	Uris Theatre
10 May 1974	New York City	United States	Uris Theatre
11 May 1974	New York City	United States	Uris Theatre

=== Headlining Tours ===
==== Queen II (UK) Tour ====
Title	Dates	Album	Continents	Shows	Band
Queen II (UK) Tour	1 March - 2 April 1974	Queen II	Europe	19	Queen

In March, the band commenced on their first headlining tour of the United Kingdom to promote their new album Queen II. It was the second major tour by the group and started only a month and a half after the end of the Queen I Tour.

===== Tour dates =====
Date	City	Country	Venue	Opening Act
Europe
1 March 1974	Blackpool	England	Empress Ballroom	Nutz
2 March 1974	Aylesbury	England	Friars Aylesbury	Nutz
3 March 1974	Plymouth	England	Plymouth Guildhall	Nutz
4 March 1974	Paignton	England	Paignton Festival Hall	Nutz
8 March 1974	Sunderland	England	Locarno Ballroom	Nutz
9 March 1974	Cambridge	England	Cambridge Corn Exchange	Nutz
10 March 1974	Croydon	England	The Greyhound	Nutz
12 March 1974	London	England	Dagenham Roundhouse	Nutz
14 March 1974	Cheltenham	England	Cheltenham Town Hall	Nutz
15 March 1974	Glasgow	Scotland	Queen Margaret Union	Nutz
16 March 1974	Stirling	Scotland	Pathfoot Refectory	Nutz
19 March 1974	Cleethorpes	England	Winter Gardens	Nutz
20 March 1974	Manchester	England	Main Debating Hall	Nutz
22 March 1974	Canvey Island	England	The Paddocks	Nutz
23 March 1974	Cromer	England	Royal Links Pavilion	Nutz
24 March 1974	Colchester	England	Woods Leisure Centre	Nutz
26 March 1974	Douglas	Isle of Man	Palace Lido	Nutz
28 March 1974	Aberystwyth	Wales	The Great Hall	Nutz
29 March 1974	Penzance	England	Penzance Gardens	Nutz
30 March 1974	Taunton	England	County Ballroom	Nutz
31 March 1974	London	England	Rainbow Theatre	Nutz
2 April 1974	Birmingham	England	Barbarella's	Nutz

==== Sheer Heart Attack Tour ====
Title	Dates	Album	Continents	Shows	Band
Sheer Heart Attack Tour	30 October 1974 – 1 May 1975	Sheer Heart Attack	Europe North America Asia	76	Queen

The Sheer Heart Attack Tour was the second headlining concert tour, and first world tour by the band in support of their 1974 album Sheer Heart Attack.

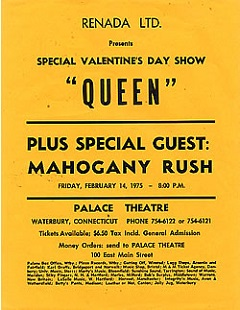
Poster for the concert at the Palace Theatre

===== Background =====
The band were soon back on the road and commenced their second tour as the headlining act, with nineteen concerts at eighteen different venues around the UK. The band rotated supporting acts, and the setlist contained much of the material from the new album Sheer Heart Attack. With more money to invest in a new stage show, the band wore new costumes for this tour and added an additional lighting rig, complete with state of the art stage effects. To conclude Queen's touring for the year, they extended the leg with mainland European shows, consisting of ten shows in six countries, performing over a two-and-a-half-week period. The year 1975 started with the American leg of the tour, before transferring to Japan. The tour would have been longer, but an accident involving the truck that transported their equipment meant it was not able to reach the remaining scheduled venues, which would have been a second American leg for the tour. In late February, on the North American tour, a handful of shows were cancelled due to Freddie Mercury's voice failing on him. After several doctor's visits, he was diagnosed with vocal fold nodules, which would impact him for the rest of his life. With this, several more shows were cancelled to allow for a more lenient touring schedule for his voice.

There were slight differences between the European, North American and Japanese sets. The Japanese shows were a bit longer; the band added Doing All Right to the set, extended Killer Queen to include the second verse, and added See What A Fool I've Been to the end of some shows as well as reviving Hangman on the final night of the tour, almost certainly due to the warm welcome they received from the Japanese fans. Additionally, for the North American leg, Seven Seas of Rhye was dropped from the setlist due to it picking up little attention from listeners.

The band planned to return to the United States in late 1975 to play arena shows, however these were all cancelled, most likely due to Queen wanting to distance themselves from Trident and switching managers to John Reid. The shows most likely wouldn't have been profitable, seeing as Queen didn't tour arenas in the United States until 1977.

===== Opening acts =====
- Hustler (United Kingdom)
- Lynyrd Skynyrd (Europe, select dates)
- Kansas (North America, select dates)
- Mahogany Rush (North America, select dates)
- Kayak (The Hague)
- The Storm (Barcelona)
- Argent (Passaic)
- REO Speedwagon (Madison)
- Bloodrock (Dallas)
- Styx (Calgary)

===== Tour dates =====
Date	City	Country	Venue
Europe
30 October 1974	Sheffield	England	Palace Theatre
31 October 1974	Hanley	England	Victoria Hall
1 November 1974	Liverpool	England	Liverpool Empire Theatre
2 November 1974	Leeds	England	University of Leeds Refectory
3 November 1974	Coventry	England	Coventry Theatre
5 November 1974	Sheffield	England	Sheffield City Hall
6 November 1974	Bradford	England	St George's Hall
7 November 1974	Newcastle	England	Newcastle City Hall
8 November 1974	Glasgow	Scotland	The Apollo
9 November 1974	Lancaster	England	The Great Hall
10 November 1974	Preston	England	Preston Guild Hall
12 November 1974	Bristol	England	Colston Hall
13 November 1974	Bournemouth	England	Winter Gardens
14 November 1974	Southampton	England	Gaumont Theatre
15 November 1974	Swansea	Wales	Brangwyn Hall
16 November 1974	Birmingham	England	Birmingham Town Hall
18 November 1974	Oxford	England	New Theatre
19 November 1974	London	England	Rainbow Theatre
20 November 1974	London	England	Rainbow Theatre
23 November 1974	Gothenburg	Sweden	Gothenburg Concert Hall
25 November 1974	Helsinki	Finland	Kulttuuritalo
27 November 1974	Lund	Sweden	Olympen
2 December 1974	Munich	West Germany	Theater an der Brienner Straße
4 December 1974 (Note: Originally scheduled at Jahrhunderthalle.)	Frankfurt	West Germany	Palmengarten
5 December 1974	Hamburg	West Germany	Musikhalle
6 December 1974	Cologne	West Germany	Sartory-Saal
8 December 1974	The Hague	Netherlands	Nederlands Congresgebouw
10 December 1974 (Note: Originally scheduled at Ancienne Belgique, Brussels.)	Schaerbeek	Belgium	Théâtre 140
13 December 1974	Barcelona	Spain	Palau dels Esports
North America
5 February 1975	Columbus	United States	Agora Ballroom
7 February 1975	Dayton	United States	Palace Theatre
8 February 1975	Cleveland	United States	Music Hall
9 February 1975	South Bend	United States	Morris Civic Auditorium
10 February 1975	Detroit	United States	Ford Auditorium
11 February 1975	Toledo	United States	Student Union Auditorium
14 February 1975	Waterbury	United States	Palace Theater
15 February 1975 (Note: Consisted of matinee and evening shows.)	Boston	United States	Orpheum Theatre
16 February 1975	New York City	United States	Avery Fisher Hall
17 February 1975	Trenton	United States	Trenton War Memorial Theater
19 February 1975	Lewiston	United States	Lewiston Armory
21 February 1975	Passaic	United States	Capitol Theatre
22 February 1975	Harrisburg	United States	State Farm Show Arena
23 February 1975	Philadelphia	United States	Erlanger Theatre
24 February 1975	Washington, D.C.	United States	Kennedy Center Concert Hall
5 March 1975	La Crosse	United States	Sawyer Auditorium
6 March 1975	Madison	United States	Dane County Coliseum
7 March 1975	Milwaukee	United States	Uptown Theatre
8 March 1975	Chicago	United States	Aragon Ballroom
9 March 1975	St. Louis	United States	Convention Hall
10 March 1975	Fort Wayne	United States	Allen County War Memorial Coliseum
12 March 1975	Atlanta	United States	Municipal Auditorium
13 March 1975	Charleston	United States	Charleston Coliseum
17 March 1975 (Note: Originally scheduled for 15 March 1975.)	Miami	United States	Miami Marine Stadium
18 March 1975	Chalmette	United States	St. Bernard Parish Civic Auditorium
20 March 1975	San Antonio	United States	San Antonio Municipal Auditorium
21 March 1975	Houston	United States	Houston Music Hall
22 March 1975	Dallas	United States	McFarlin Memorial Auditorium
23 March 1975	Dallas	United States	McFarlin Memorial Auditorium
25 March 1975	Tulsa	United States	Tulsa Municipal Theater
29 March 1975	Santa Monica	United States	Santa Monica Civic Auditorium
30 March 1975	San Francisco	United States	Winterland Ballroom
2 April 1975	Edmonton	Canada	Kinsmen Field House
3 April 1975	Calgary	Canada	Stampede Corral
6 April 1975	Seattle	United States	Paramount Northwest Theatre
Asia
19 April 1975	Tokyo	Japan	Nippon Budokan
22 April 1975	Nagoya	Japan	Aichi Prefectural Gymnasium
23 April 1975	Kobe	Japan	Kokusai Kaikan Hall
25 April 1975	Fukuoka	Japan	Fukuoka Kyuden Kinen Gymnasium
28 April 1975	Okayama	Japan	Kenritsu Taiikukan
29 April 1975	Kakegawa	Japan	Yamaha Tsumagoi Hall
30 April 1975	Yokohama	Japan	Yokohama Cultural Gymnasium
1 May 1975	Tokyo	Japan	Nippon Budokan

==== A Night at the Opera Tour ====
Title	Dates	Album	Continents	Shows	Band
A Night At The Opera Tour	14 November 1975 – 23 April 1976	A Night at the Opera	Europe North America Asia Oceania	78	Queen

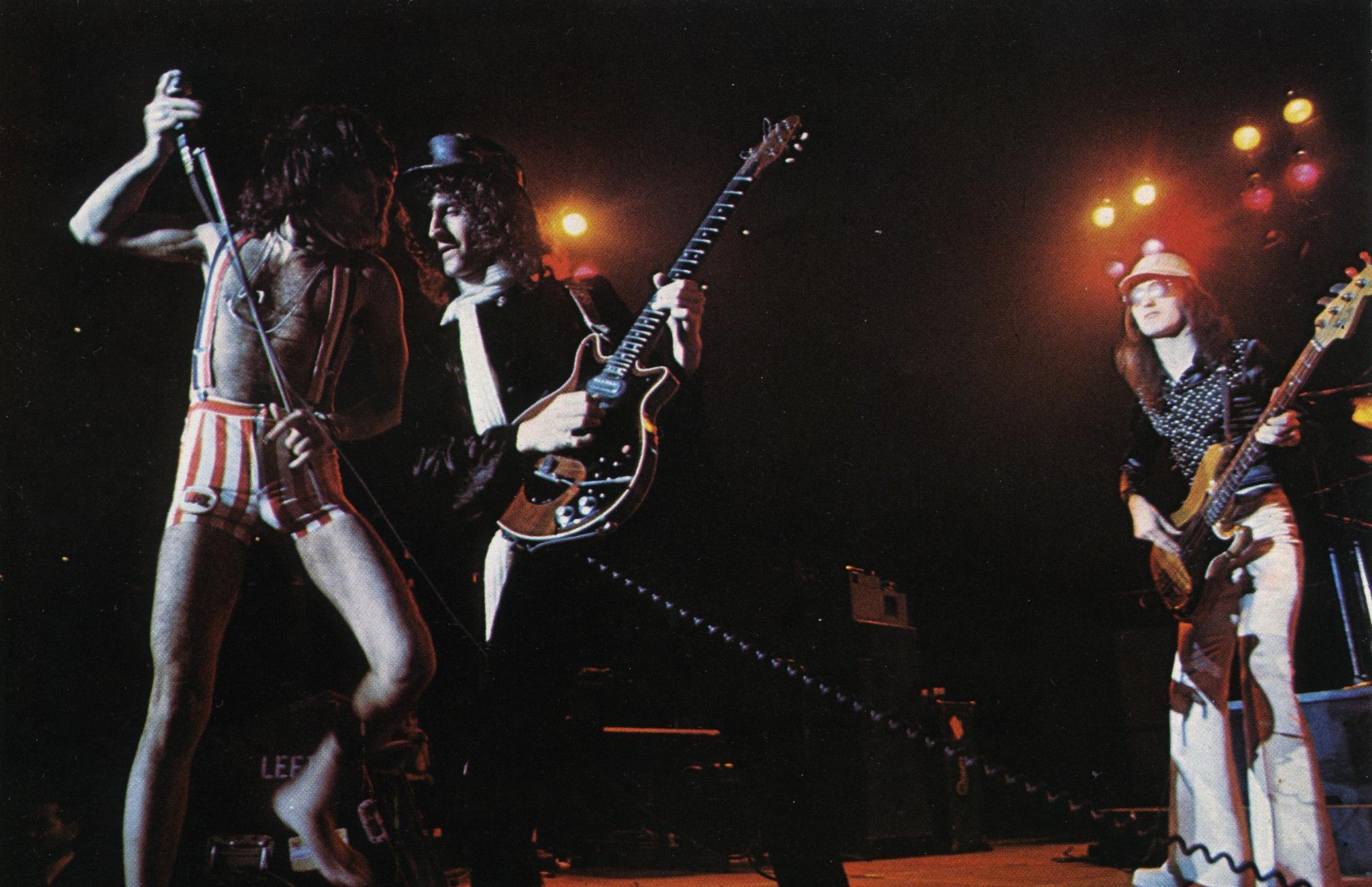
Queen performing at the 22 March 1976 concert in Tokyo

The A Night at the Opera Tour was the third headlining concert tour by Queen to promote A Night at the Opera. It spanned 1975 and 1976, and covered the UK, the US, Japan, and Australia. It marked the debut of "Bohemian Rhapsody", which would be played at virtually every Queen gig thereafter.

The DVD A Night at the Odeon is taken from the Christmas Eve concert at the Hammersmith Odeon. "It's quite something to watch", said Brian May. "We were just a four-piece, but we made a lot of noise. I'm quite shocked at how good it was. We were incredibly tight and, at the same time – because we knew each other so well – very loose in terms of improvisation."

===== Opening acts =====
- Mr Big (Europe)
- Cate Brothers (North America, select dates)
- Ray Burton (Australia, select dates)
- The Bellamy Brothers (Detroit)
- Foghat (Cincinnati)
- Bob Seger & the Silver Bullet Band (Saginaw, St. Louis, Indianapolis)
- Leslie West (Fort Wayne, Milwaukee)
- Y & T (Berkeley)
- Lucifer (Perth)
- Cold Chisel (Adelaide)
- Taste (Sydney, Melbourne)

===== Tour dates =====
Date	City	Country	Venue
Europe
14 November 1975	Liverpool	England	Liverpool Empire Theatre
15 November 1975	Liverpool	England	Liverpool Empire Theatre
16 November 1975	Coventry	England	Coventry Theatre
17 November 1975	Bristol	England	Colston Hall
18 November 1975	Bristol	England	Colston Hall
19 November 1975	Cardiff	Wales	Capitol Theatre
21 November 1975	Taunton	England	Odeon Theatre
23 November 1975	Bournemouth	England	Winter Gardens
24 November 1975	Southampton	England	Gaumont Theatre
26 November 1975	Manchester	England	Free Trade Hall
29 November 1975	London	England	Hammersmith Odeon
30 November 1975	London	England	Hammersmith Odeon
1 December 1975	London	England	Hammersmith Odeon
2 December 1975	London	England	Hammersmith Odeon
3 December 1975	London	England	Hammersmith Odeon
7 December 1975	Wolverhampton	England	Wolverhampton Civic Hall
8 December 1975	Preston	England	Preston Guild Hall
9 December 1975	Birmingham	England	Odeon Theatre
10 December 1975	Birmingham	England	Odeon Theatre
11 December 1975	Newcastle	England	Newcastle City Hall
13 December 1975	Dundee	Scotland	Caird Hall
14 December 1975	Aberdeen	Scotland	Capitol Theatre
15 December 1975	Glasgow	Scotland	The Apollo
16 December 1975	Glasgow	Scotland	The Apollo
24 December 1975	London	England	Hammersmith Odeon
North America
27 January 1976	Waterbury	United States	Palace Theatre
29 January 1976	Boston	United States	Music Hall
30 January 1976	Boston	United States	Music Hall
31 January 1976	Upper Darby	United States	Tower Theater
1 February 1976	Upper Darby	United States	Tower Theater
2 February 1976	Upper Darby	United States	Tower Theater
5 February 1976	New York City	United States	Beacon Theatre
6 February 1976	New York City	United States	Beacon Theatre
7 February 1976	New York City	United States	Beacon Theatre
8 February 1976	New York City	United States	Beacon Theatre
11 February 1976	Detroit	United States	Masonic Auditorium
12 February 1976	Detroit	United States	Masonic Auditorium
13 February 1976	Cincinnati	United States	Riverfront Coliseum
14 February 1976	Cleveland	United States	Music Hall
15 February 1976	Toledo	United States	Toledo Sports Arena
18 February 1976	Saginaw	United States	Saginaw Civic Center
19 February 1976	Columbus	United States	Veterans Memorial Auditorium
20 February 1976	Pittsburgh	United States	Stanley Theater
22 February 1976	Chicago	United States	Auditorium Theatre
23 February 1976	Chicago	United States	Auditorium Theatre
24 February 1976	Chicago	United States	Auditorium Theatre
26 February 1976	St. Louis	United States	Convention Hall
27 February 1976	Indianapolis	United States	Indiana Convention Exposition Center
28 February 1976	Madison	United States	Dane County Memorial Coliseum
29 February 1976	Fort Wayne	United States	War Memorial Coliseum
2 March 1976	Milwaukee	United States	Milwaukee Auditorium
3 March 1976	Saint Paul	United States	St. Paul Auditorium
7 March 1976	Berkeley	United States	Berkeley Community Theatre
9 March 1976	Santa Monica	United States	Santa Monica Civic Auditorium
10 March 1976	Santa Monica	United States	Santa Monica Civic Auditorium
11 March 1976	Santa Monica	United States	Santa Monica Civic Auditorium
12 March 1976	San Diego	United States	San Diego Sports Arena
Asia
22 March 1976	Tokyo	Japan	Nippon Budokan
23 March 1976	Nagoya	Japan	Aichi Prefectural Gymnasium
24 March 1976	Himeji	Japan	Himeji Kōsei Nenkin Kaikan
26 March 1976	Fukuoka	Japan	Fukuoka Kyuden Kinen Gymnasium
29 March 1976	Osaka	Japan	Osaka Kōsei Nenkin Kaikan
31 March 1976	Tokyo	Japan	Nippon Budokan
1 April 1976	Tokyo	Japan	Nippon Budokan
2 April 1976	Sendai	Japan	Miyagi Prefectural Sport Center
4 April 1976	Tokyo	Japan	Nihon University Auditorium
Oceania
11 April 1976	Perth	Australia	Perth Entertainment Centre
14 April 1976	Adelaide	Australia	Apollo Stadium
15 April 1976	Adelaide	Australia	Apollo Stadium
17 April 1976	Sydney	Australia	Hordern Pavilion
18 April 1976	Sydney	Australia	Hordern Pavilion
19 April 1976	Melbourne	Australia	Festival Hall
20 April 1976	Melbourne	Australia	Festival Hall
23 April 1976	Brisbane	Australia	Festival Hall

==== Summer Tour 1976 ====
Title	Dates	Album	Continents	Shows	Band
Summer Tour 1976	1–18 September 1976	N/A	Europe	4	Queen

Queen played four shows during a short UK tour in September 1976. They began with two nights at Edinburgh Playhouse on 1 and 2 September. On 10 September, they played in Cardiff, which was their second and final show in the city, having played there on their previous tour in 1975.

The final Queen show of the year was in Hyde Park, London, on 18 September, after the hot summer of 1976. The Hyde Park gig was in fact a free concert which drew in a crowd of about 180,000. The free concert was organised by entrepreneur Richard Branson.

Several audio recordings exist of the Hyde Park concert, including a soundboard source. The only other concert on the tour with available audio is the second Edinburgh gig, which has an audience recording in circulation.

This tour featured the debut performances of "You Take My Breath Away", "'39" and "Tie Your Mother Down" (Tie Your Mother Down was not played at Hyde Park due to limited time), about 3 months before A Day At The Races was released.

===== Tour dates =====
Date	City	Country	Venue
1 September 1976	Edinburgh	Scotland	Edinburgh Playhouse
2 September 1976	Edinburgh	Scotland	Edinburgh Playhouse
10 September 1976	Cardiff	Wales	Cardiff Castle
18 September 1976	London	England	Hyde Park

==== A Day at the Races Tour ====
Title	Dates	Album	Continents	Shows	Band
A Day at the Races Tour	13 January - 7 June 1977	A Day at the Races	North America Europe	59	Queen

==== News of the World Tour ====
Title	Dates	Album	Continents	Shows	Band
News of the World Tour	11 November 1977 – 13 May 1978	News of the World	North America Europe	46	Queen

==== Jazz Tour ====
Title	Dates	Album	Continents	Shows	Band
Jazz Tour	28 October 1978 – 6 May 1979	Jazz	North America Europe Asia	78	Queen

==== Crazy Tour ====
Title	Dates	Album	Continents	Shows	Band
Crazy Tour	22 November - 26 December 1979 (Note: The gig on 26 December 1979 was one of the benefit concerts in Concerts for the People of Kampuchea)	N/A	Europe	20	Queen

=== One-off performances post-1973 ===
Date	Event	City	Country	Performed Songs	Type
27 January 1974	Sunbury Pop Festival	Melbourne	Australia	N/A	Music festival
6 October 1977	We Are The Champions Music Video Shoot	London	United Kingdom	1. We Are The Champions; 2. We Are The Champions 3. We Are The Champions 4. We Are The Champions 5. Tie Your Mother Down 6. Keep Yourself Alive 7. Somebody To Love 8. White Man 9. The Prophet's Song 10. Liar 11. Bohemian Rhapsody (Intro) 12. Now I'm Here 13. Jailhouse Rock 14. See What A Fool I've Been	Music Video Shooting
18 August 1979	Saarbrücken Open Air	Saarbrücken	Germany	1. We Will Rock You (Fast); 2. Let Me Entertain You 3. If You Can't Beat Them 4. Mustapha 5. Death On Two Legs 6. Killer Queen 7. I'm In Love With My Car 8. Get Down, Make Love 9. You're My Best Friend 10. Now I'm Here 11. Somebody to Love 12. Spread Your Wings 13. Love of My Life 14. Keep Yourself Alive 15. Drum / Tympani Solo 16. Guitar Solo 17. Brighton Rock (ending) 18. Bohemian Rhapsody 19. Tie Your Mother Down 20. Sheer Heart Attack 21. Jailhouse Rock 22. We Will Rock You 23. We Are the Champions	Music festival

=== Guest Appearances ===
Date	Event	City	Country	Songs Performed	Band Member(s)
17 October 1979	The Royal Ballet	London	United Kingdom	1. Crazy Little Thing Called Love; 2. Bohemian Rhapsody	Freddie Mercury

== 1980s ==
=== Headlining Tours ===
==== The Game Tour ====
Title	Dates	Album	Continents	Shows	Band
The Game Tour	30 June 1980 – 18 October 1981	The Game	North America Europe Asia South America	80	Queen

==== Hot Space Tour ====
Title	Dates	Album	Continents	Shows	Band
Hot Space Tour	9 April - 3 November 1982	Hot Space	Europe North America Asia	69	Queen

==== The Works Tour ====
Title	Dates	Album	Continents	Shows	Band
The Works Tour	24 August 1984 – 15 May 1985 (Note: The gigs on 12 & 19 January 1985 were part of the music festival Rock in Rio)	The Works	Europe Africa South America Oceania Asia	48	Queen

==== The Magic Tour ====
Title	Dates	Album	Continents	Shows	Band
The Magic Tour	7 June - 9 August 1986	A Kind of Magic	Europe	26	Queen

=== One-off performances ===
Date	Event	City	Country	Songs Performed	Type
24 November 1981	One-off Concerts	Montreal	Canada	1. We Will Rock You (fast); 2. Let Me Entertain You 3. Play the Game 4. Somebody to Love 5. Killer Queen 6. I'm in Love with My Car 7. Get Down, Make Love 8. Save Me 9. Now I'm Here 10. Dragon Attack 11. Now I'm Here (Reprise) 12. Love of My Life 13. Under Pressure 14. Keep Yourself Alive 15. Timpani & Guitar Solos 16. Flash's Theme 17. The Hero 18. Crazy Little Thing Called Love 19. Bohemian Rhapsody 20. Tie Your Mother Down 21. Another One Bites the Dust 22. Sheer Heart Attack 23. Jailhouse Rock 24. We Will Rock You 25. We Are the Champions	Concert film shooting
25 November 1981	One-off Concerts	Montreal	Canada	1. We Will Rock You (fast); 2. Let Me Entertain You 3. Play the Game 4. Somebody to Love 5. Killer Queen 6. I'm in Love with My Car 7. Get Down, Make Love 8. Save Me 9. Now I'm Here 10. Dragon Attack 11. Now I'm Here (Reprise) 12. Love of My Life 13. Under Pressure 14. Keep Yourself Alive 15. Timpani & Guitar Solos 16. Flash's Theme 17. The Hero 18. Crazy Little Thing Called Love 19. Bohemian Rhapsody 20. Tie Your Mother Down 21. Another One Bites the Dust 22. Sheer Heart Attack 23. We Will Rock You 24. We Are the Champions	Concert film shooting
25 September 1982	Saturday Night Live	New York City	United States	1. Crazy Little Thing Called Love; 2. Under Pressure	Television shows and specials
3 February 1984	Sanremo Music Festival	Sanremo	Italy	1. Radio Ga Ga (Mimed)	Television shows and specials
4 February 1984	Sanremo Music Festival	Sanremo	Italy	1. Radio Ga Ga (Mimed)	Television shows and specials
12 May 1984	Golden Rose Festival	Montreux	Switzerland	1. Radio Ga Ga (Mimed); 2. Tear It Up (Mimed) 3. It's a Hard Life (Mimed) 4. Hammer to Fall (Mimed)	Music festival
13 July 1985	Live Aid	London	United Kingdom	1. Bohemian Rhapsody; 2. Radio Ga Ga 3. Hammer To Fall 4. Crazy Little Thing Called Love 5. We Will Rock You 6. We Are The Champions	Benefit concert
13 July 1985	Live Aid	London	United Kingdom	1.Is This the World We Created...?	Benefit concert
11 May 1986	Golden Rose Festival	Montreux	Switzerland	1. One Vision (Mimed); 2. A Kind of Magic (Mimed) 3. Friends Will Be Friends (Mimed) 4. Hammer To Fall (Mimed)	Music festival

==== Montreal 1981 ====
In 1980, director Saul Swimmer approached Queen with the idea of producing a concert film. Initially proposed to be shot at the Madison Square Garden, the band moved shooting to the Montreal Forum in Canada due to the audience being louder than the monitors there. Two one-off gigs were played on 24 and 25 November 1981. When filming was occurring, Saul Swimmer wanted the band to choreograph their act and wear the same outfits on both nights, so he could switch between the footage at will. Out of spite, Jailhouse Rock was performed on the first night, with Mercury still in his trousers, which he wore during the encores. During the second night, not only was the Elvis cover not performed, but Freddie had also switched to shorts for the encores, to deliberately mess with the continuity of the footage.

Later on, Swimmer acquired the rights to the footage. The footage was given a dry mix and released in 1982 as "We Will Rock You" by Mobilevision. Despite being performed during the second encore of the first night, "Jailhouse Rock" was placed after "Crazy Little Thing Called Love" on official releases.

The film was released many times, including in 1984, 1997 and 2001, before the rights to the film were bought back by Queen Productions in early 2007. As all the footage that had not been included in the final cut had been discarded, the band could not re-edit the film, and could only remaster the video and remix the audio. Nonetheless, the footage was re-released properly in 2007 as "Queen Rock Montreal", and has received much critical acclaim since.

These two gigs marked the last time Queen played live without a fifth player, as all tours and live performances from 1982 onwards would feature an extra man playing on keyboards.

==== Live Aid ====
The performance at Live Aid at Wembley Stadium in 1985 is often regarded as Queen's greatest single live performance. Their set lasted 21 minutes and consisted of a version of "Bohemian Rhapsody" (ballad section and guitar solo) slightly sped up in lyrics, "Radio Ga Ga", a crowd singalong, "Hammer to Fall", "Crazy Little Thing Called Love", "We Will Rock You" (1st verse), and "We Are the Champions". Mercury and May returned later on to perform a version of "Is This the World We Created?" The band were unenthusiastic about performing when they were first approached by Bob Geldof, but the acclaim they received after their performance led to them writing, collectively, the song "One Vision" which was then released as a single.

=== Guest Appearances ===
Date	Event	City	Country	Songs Performed	Band member(s)
9 September 1987	Def Leppard	London	United Kingdom	1. Now I'm Here	Brian May

== 1990s ==
Queen did not perform any concerts in their original line-up in the 1990s. They only appeared sporadically following The Freddie Mercury Tribute Concert. Not all appearances featured all three surviving members.

=== The Freddie Mercury Tribute Concert ===
After Freddie Mercury's death in November 1991, Queen organised The Freddie Mercury Tribute Concert and took place in April 1992 at Wembley Stadium. The three remaining members (in one of the few concerts they played together after Mercury's death) and a host of special guests staged a lengthy and emotional show billed as the Concert For AIDS Awareness (as well as Concert for Life) that was televised worldwide.

Date	Event	City	Country	Songs Performed	Type
20 April 1992	The Freddie Mercury Tribute Concert	London	United Kingdom	1. Tie Your Mother Down (With Joe Elliot & Slash); 2. I Want It All (With Roger Daltrey & Tony Iommi) 3. Las Palabras de Amor (With Zucchero); 4. Hammer To Fall (With Gary Cherone) 5. Stone Cold Crazy (With James Hetfield); 6. Innuendo (With Robert Plant) 7. Crazy Little Thing Called Love (With Robert Plant) 8. Radio Ga Ga (With Paul Young) 9. Who Wants To Love Forever (With Seal); 10. I Want To Break Free (With Lisa Stansfield) 11. Under Pressure (With David Bowie & Annie Lennox); 12. All The Young Dudes (With David Bowie, Ian Hunter, Mick Ronson, Joe Elliot & Phil Collen) 13. Heroes (With David Bowie & Mick Ronson); 14. '39 (With George Michael) 15. These Are The Days Of Our Lives (With George Michael & Lisa Stansfield); 16. Somebody To Love (With George Michael) 17. Bohemian Rhapsody (With Elton John & Axl Rose); 18. The Show Must Go On (With Elton John & Tony Iommi) 19. We Will Rock You (With Axl Rose) 20. We Are The Champions (With Liza Minnelli)	Benefit Concert

=== World Premiere of Bejart Ballet For Life ===
The final occasion where all remaining members of Queen performed on stage was in January 1997 at Paris in France for the world premiere of Bejart Ballet For Life. Joining the surviving trio were Spike Edney on keyboards/backing-vocals and Elton John who sang lead vocals. They only performed one song, namely "The Show Must Go On" which was one of the two songs they had performed together at The Freddie Mercury Tribute Concert, and this was the last reported appearance of John Deacon on stage.

Date	Event	City	Country	Songs Performed	Band
17 January 1997	Béjart Ballet	Paris	France	1. The Show Must Go On	Queen + Elton John, last appearance of John Deacon

=== Guest Appearances ===
Date	Event	City	Country	Song(s) Performed	Band Member(s)
22 October 1991	Extreme	London	United Kingdom	1. Tie Your Mother Down; 2. Song For Love	Brian May
20 April 1992	Freddie Mercury Tribute Concert	London	United Kingdom	1. Now I'm Here (With Def Leppard)	Brian May
13 June 1992	Guns N' Roses	London	United Kingdom	1. Tie Your Mother Down; 2. We Will Rock You (Fast)	Brian May
19 November 1992	DoRo Party	Vienna	Austria	1. Money; 2. Twist and Shout (With Campino and Nina Hagen) 3. Lucille (With Nina Hagen) 4. Long Tall Sally (With Klaus Meine)	Brian & Roger
23 December 1992	Extreme	London	United Kingdom	1. I Want To Break Free; 2. Tie Your Mother Down	Brian May
18 September 1993	Midhurst Festival	Midhurst	United Kingdom	1. A Kind Of Magic; 2. I Want To Break Free 3. We Will Rock You 4. Another One Bites The Dust (With Paul Young) 5. These Are The Days Of Our Lives 6. Radio Ga Ga	Roger & John
5 December 1994	Meat Loaf	London	United Kingdom	1. We Will Rock You; 2. Roll Over Beethoven	Brian May
17 December 1994	SAS Band	London	United Kingdom	1. Only Make Believe; 2. Tie Your Mother Down (Country Version)	Brian May
7 February 1998	DoRo Party	Purkersdorf	Austria	N/A	Brian & Roger
25 November 1999	Foo Fighters	London	United Kingdom	1. We Will Rock You (Only Brian); 2. Now I'm Here	Brian & Roger

== 2000s ==
Following Freddie Mercury's death and John Deacon's retirement, May and Taylor continued to make sporadic live appearances in addition to their long-term collaboration with Paul Rodgers.

=== Headlining Tours ===
==== Queen + Paul Rodgers Tour ====
Title	Dates	Album	Continents	Shows	Band
Queen + Paul Rodgers Tour	28 March 2005 – 13 April 2006	N/A	Europe North America Asia	64	Queen + Paul Rodgers

==== Rock the Cosmos Tour ====
Title	Dates	Album	Continents	Shows	Band
Rock the Cosmos Tour	12 September - 29 November 2008	The Cosmos Rocks	Europe Middle East South America	40	Queen + Paul Rodgers

=== One-off performances ===
==== Music festivals ====
Date	Event	City	Country	Performed Songs	Band
19 March 2005	46664	Cape Town	South Africa	1. Tie Your Mother Down; 2. Can't Get Enough 3. I Want to Break Free 4. Fat Bottomed Girls 5. Say It's Not True 6. Too Much Love Will Kill You 7. Hammer To Fall 8. A Kind Of Magic 9. Feel Like Makin' Love 10. Radio Ga Ga 11. Crazy Little Thing Called Love 12. The Show Must Go On 13. All Right Now 14. We Will Rock You 15. We Are The Champions	Queen + Paul Rodgers
27 June 2008	46664	London	United Kingdom	1. One Vision; 2. Tie Your Mother Down 3. The Show Must Go On 4. We Will Rock You 5. We Are The Champions 6. All Right Now	Queen + Paul Rodgers

==== Benefit concerts ====
Date	Event	City	Country	Songs Performed	Band
14 May 2003	ARK Charity	London	United Kingdom	1. I Want To Break Free; 2. A Kind Of Magic 3. Radio Ga Ga 4. The Kids Are Alright (With Bob Geldof) 5. We Will Rock You 6. Tie Your Mother Down 7. Rock And Roll	Brian & Roger
29 November 2003	46664	Cape Town	South Africa	1. Say It's Not True; 2. Invincible Hope 3. 46664 4. The Show Must Go On (With Chris Thompson) 5. Toss The Feathers (With The Corrs); 6. Is This The World We Created? (With Andrea Corr) 7. Everybody's Got to Learn Sometime (With Zucchero); 8. Amandla (With Anastacia, Beyoncé, Dave Stewart etc.) 9. Bohemian Rhapsody 10. I Want It All (With Zucchero) 11. I Want To Break Free (With Tandy) 12. Radio Ga Ga 13. We Will Rock You (With Anastacia) 14. We Are The Champions (With Anastacia)	Brian & Roger

==== Award shows ====
Date	Event	City	Country	Songs performed	Band
19 March 2001	Rock and Roll Hall of Fame Induction Ceremony	New York City	United States	1. We Will Rock You (With Dave Grohl and Taylor Hawkins); 2. Tie Your Mother Down (With Dave Grohl & Taylor Hawkins)	Brian & Roger
12 June 2003	Songwriters Hall of Fame	New York City	United States	1. Crazy Little Thing Called Love (With Wynonna Judd); 2. We Will Rock You	Brian & Roger
16 October 2004	MTV Russia Music Awards	Moscow	Russia	1. We Will Rock You (With We Will Rock You Cast); 2. We Are The Champions (With We Will Rock You Cast)	Brian & Roger
11 November 2004	UK Hall Of Fame Induction	London	United Kingdom	1. We Will Rock You; 2. We Are The Champions 3. All Right Now	Queen + Paul Rodgers

==== Television shows and specials ====
Date	Show	City	Country	Songs Performed	Band
18 May 2002	Parkinson	London	United Kingdom	1. Somebody To Love (With Hannah Jane Fox); 2. Hammer To Fall 3. We Will Rock You (With Tony Vincent); 4. We Are The Champions (With Tony Vincent)	Brian & Roger
3 June 2002	Party at the Palace	London	United Kingdom	1. God Save The Queen	Brian May
3 June 2002	Party at the Palace	London	United Kingdom	1. Radio Ga Ga; 2. We Will Rock You 3. We Are The Champions (With Will Young); 4. Bohemian Rhapsody (With We Will Rock You Cast) 5. All You Need Is Love (All Star Finale); 6. Hey Jude (All Star Finale) 7. I Saw Her Standing There (All Star Finale)	Brian & Roger
16 November 2002	Children in Need	London	United Kingdom	1. We Will Rock You (With We Will Rock You Cast); 2. We Are The Champions (With We Will Rock You Cast) 3. We Are The Champions (With We Will Rock You Cast)	Brian & Roger
8 August 2004	TV Special	Sydney	Australia	1. Bohemian Rhapsody (With We Will Rock You Cast)	Brian & Roger
12 November 2004	Wetten, dass..?	Nuremberg	Germany	1. We Will Rock You (With We Will Rock You Cast); 2. We Are The Champions (With We Will Rock You Cast)	Brian & Roger
25 May 2006	VH1 Rock Honors	Las Vegas	United States	1. Tie Your Mother Down (With Foo Fighters); 2. Under Pressure 3. The Show Must Go On 4. We Will Rock You (With Dave Grohl & Taylor Hawkins) 5. We Are The Champions (With Foo Fighters)	Queen + Paul Rodgers
10 March 2007	Al Murray's Happy Hour	London	United Kingdom	1. We Will Rock You (With We Will Rock You Cast)	Brian & Roger
4 April 2008	Al Murray's Happy Hour	London	United Kingdom	1. C-lebrity; 2. Bohemian Rhapsody (Final chords only) 3. All Right Now 4. We Will Rock You	Queen + Paul Rodgers
20 May 2009	American Idol	Los Angeles	United States	1. We Are The Champions (With Kris Allen & Adam Lambert)	Brian & Roger
15 November 2009	The X Factor	London	United Kingdom	1. Bohemian Rhapsody (With finalists)	Brian & Roger

==== Other performances ====
Date	Event	City	Country	Songs Performed	Band
30 April 2002	Koningsdag	Amsterdam	Netherlands	1. Radio Ga Ga; 2. Tie Your Mother Down 3. Another One Bites The Dust (With Patti Russo); 4. Under Pressure (With Patti Russo) 5. Hammer To Fall 6. The Show Must Go On (With Patti Russo) 7. No-One but You (Only the Good Die Young) 8. We Will Rock You 9. We Are The Champions (With Trijntje Oosterhuis)	Brian & Roger
14 May 2002	We Will Rock You Afterparty	London	United Kingdom	1. Tie Your Mother Down (With Kerry Ellis); 2. Guitar Men (With Ben Elton) 3. Hammer To Fall 4. Tutti Frutti (With Gary Brooker) 5. A Whiter Shade of Pale (With Gary Booker); 6. Rock and Roll 7. With A Little Help From My Friends 8. All The Way	Brian & Roger
18 October 2002	Hollywood Walk of Fame Afterparty	Los Angeles	United States	1. Tie Your Mother Down; 2. Under Pressure (With Patti Russo) 3. Another One Bites The Dust (With Patti Russo) 4. Sleeping On The Sidewalk 5. I'm In Love With My Car 6. Stone Cold Crazy (With Jeff Scott Soto) 7. Crazy Little Thing Called Love 8. Hammer To Fall 9. We Will Rock You 10. We Are The Champions 11. Rock and Roll (With Steve Vai and Carmine Appice)	Brian & Roger
7 August 2003	We Will Rock You Afterparty	Melbourne	Australia	1. Tie Your Mother Down (With Amanda Harrison); 2. Whole Lotta Love 3. Rock and Roll	Brian & Roger
8 September 2004	We Will Rock You Afterparty	Las Vegas	United States	1. Tie Your Mother Down (With Jason Wooten and Kacie Sheik); 2. The Show Must Go On (With Kacie Sheik) 3. Don't Stop Me Now (With Jason Wooten) 4. Stone Cold Crazy (With Glenn Hughes) 5. Rock and Roll 6. Johnny B. Goode (With Meat Loaf) 7. With a Little Help from My Friends (With Jason Wooten)	Brian & Roger
9 October 2004	We Will Rock You Afterparty	Sydney	Australia	1. Tie Your Mother Down (With Amanda Harrison); 2. I'm In Love With My Car 3. Rock and Roll 4. Little Wing 5. Johnny B. Goode (With Andrew Swann) 6. With A Little Help From My Friends (With Kate Hoolihan)	Brian & Roger
17 October 2004	We Will Rock You Afterparty	Moscow	Russia	1. Tie Your Mother Down (With Olga Belaya); 2. I'm In Love With My Car 3. The Show Must Go On (With Zemfira); 4. Sleeping On The Sidewalk 5. We Will Rock You (With We Will Rock You Cast) 6. Rock And Roll 7. Johnny B. Goode (With Evgeiny Drier and Anthon Bizeev 8. With A Little Help From My Friends (With We Will Rock You Cast)	Brian & Roger
12 December 2004	We Will Rock You Afterparty	Cologne	Germany	1. Tie Your Mother Down (With Brigitte Oelke); 2. I'm In Love With My Car 3. The Show Must Go On (With Alex Melcher) 4. Little Wing 5. Don't Stop Me Now (With Michaela Kovarikova) 6. Sleeping On The Sidewalk 7. Rock and Roll 8. With A Little Help From My Friends (With We Will Rock You Cast)	Brian & Roger

=== Guest Appearances ===
Date	Event	City	Country	Songs Performed	Band Member(s)
9 July 2000	Party in the Park	London	United Kingdom	1. We Will Rock You (With Five); 2. Tie Your Mother Down (With Five)	Brian & Roger
27 September 2000	Five	London	United Kingdom	1. We Will Rock You	Brian & Roger
24 November 2001	SAS Band	London	United Kingdom	1. Radio Ga Ga; 2. Since You've Been Gone 3. Under Pressure (With Treana Morris) 4. Strange Frontier 5. Tie Your Mother Down 6. No-One But You	Brian & Roger
16 March 2002	Liza Minnelli's Wedding	New York City	United States	1. We Are The Champions; 2. Tie Your Mother Down	Brian May
3 June 2002	Party at the Palace	London	United Kingdom	1. You Can't Hurry Love (With Phil Collins)	Roger Taylor
3 June 2002	Party at the Palace	London	United Kingdom	1. Move It (With Cliff Richard and S Club 7); 2. With A Little Help From My Friends (With Joe Cocker)	Brian May
27 May 2003	Pavarotti & Friends	Modena	Italy	1. We Will Rock You; 2. Radio Ga Ga 3. Too Much Love Will Kill You (With Luciano Pavarotti); 4. We Are The Champions (With Zucchero)	Brian & Roger
20 September 2003	We Will Rock You (Martinee performance)	London	United Kingdom	1. Bohemian Rhapsody	Brian May
20 September 2003	We Will Rock You (Evening Performance)	London	United Kingdom	1. Bohemian Rhapsody	Brian May
27 September 2003	We Will Rock You Musical	London	United Kingdom	1. Bohemian Rhapsody	Brian May
20 October 2003	We Will Rock You Musical	London	United Kingdom	1. Bohemian Rhapsody	Brian May
27 October 2003	We Will Rock You Musical	London	United Kingdom	1. Bohemian Rhapsody	Brian May
29 October 2003	We Will Rock You Musical	London	United Kingdom	1. Bohemian Rhapsody	Brian May
30 October 2003	We Will Rock You Musical	London	United Kingdom	1. Bohemian Rhapsody	Brian May
31 October 2003	Def Leppard	London	United Kingdom	1. Tie Your Mother Down	Brian May
2 January 2004	We Will Rock You Musical	Madrid	Spain	1. Bohemian Rhapsody	Brian May
27 January 2004	We Will Rock You Musical	Madrid	Spain	1. Bohemian Rhapsody; 2. Tie Your Mother Down	Brian May
31 January 2004	We Will Rock You (Matinee Performance)	London	United Kingdom	1. Bohemian Rhapsody	Brian May
31 January 2004	We Will Rock You (Evening Performance)	London	United Kingdom	1. Bohemian Rhapsody; 2. We Are The Champions	Brian May
17 April 2004	We Will Rock You (Matinee Performance)	London	United Kingdom	1. Bohemian Rhapsody; 2. We Are The Champions	Brian May
17 April 2004	We Will Rock You (Evening Performance)	London	United Kingdom	1. Bohemian Rhapsody; 2. We Are The Champions	Brian May
3 May 2004	We Will Rock You Musical	Madrid	Spain	1. Bohemian Rhapsody	Brian May
11 May 2004	We Will Rock You Musical	London	United Kingdom	1. Bohemian Rhapsody; 2. We Are The Champions	Brian May
30 May 2004	We Will Rock You Musical	Madrid	Spain	1. Bohemian Rhapsody; 2. The Show Must Go On	Brian May
18 November 2004	SAS Band	Copenhagen	Denmark	1. Radio Ga Ga; 2. Under Pressure (With Chris Thompson) 3. Rock and Roll 4. Boys Are Back In Town (With Midge Ure) 5. We Will Rock You 6. We Are The Champions	Roger Taylor
6 December 2004	SAS Band	London	United Kingdom	1. Radio Ga Ga; 2. Under Pressure (With Chris Thompson) 3. Rock and Roll 4. We Will Rock You 5. We Are The Champions	Roger Taylor
18 December 2004	We Will Rock You (Matinee Performance)	Las Vegas	United States	1. Bohemian Rhapsody; 2. The Show Must Go On	Brian May
18 December 2004	We Will Rock You (Evening Performance)	Las Vegas	United States	1. Bohemian Rhapsody; 2. The Show Must Go On	Brian May
12 January 2005	We Will Rock You Musical	London	United Kingdom	1. Bohemian Rhapsody; 2. Tie Your Mother Down 3. The Show Must Go On	Brian & Roger
14 October 2005	Foo Fighters	East Rutherford	United States	1. Tie Your Mother Down	Roger Taylor
11 May 2006	We Will Rock You Musical	London	United Kingdom	1. Bohemian Rhapsody; 2. The Show Must Go On	Brian May
17 June 2006	Foo Fighters	London	United Kingdom	1. We Will Rock You; 2. Tie Your Mother Down	Brian & Roger
5 September 2006	We Will Rock You Musical	London	United Kingdom	1. Bohemian Rhapsody; 2. Love Of My Life 3. Say It's Not True 4. The Show Must Go On	Brian & Roger
22 September 2006	McFly	London	United Kingdom	1. Don't Stop Me Now; 2. 5 Colours in Her Hair	Brian May
7 October 2006	We Will Rock You (Matinee Performance)	London	United Kingdom	1. Bohemian Rhapsody	Brian May
7 October 2006	We Will Rock You (Evening Performance)	London	United Kingdom	1. Bohemian Rhapsody	Brian May
14 May 2007	We Will Rock You Musical	London	United Kingdom	1. Bohemian Rhapsody; 2. The Show Must Go On	Brian & Roger
1 August 2007	We Will Rock You Musical	Toronto	Canada	1. Bohemian Rhapsody; 2. The Show Must Go On (With Canadian Idol Finalists)	Brian & Roger
29 September 2007	We Will Rock You (Matinee Performance)	London	United Kingdom	1. Bohemian Rhapsody	Brian May
29 September 2007	We Will Rock You (Evening Performance)	London	United Kingdom	1. Bohemian Rhapsody	Brian May
17 November 2007	Foo Fighters	London	United Kingdom	1. '39	Brian & Roger
29 December 2007	We Will Rock You (Matinee Performance)	London	United Kingdom	1. Bohemian Rhapsody	Brian May
29 December 2007	We Will Rock You (Evening Performance)	London	United Kingdom	1. Bohemian Rhapsody	Brian May
24 January 2008	We Will Rock You Musical	Vienna	Austria	1. Bohemian Rhapsody	Brian May
21 May 2008	We Will Rock You Musical	London	United Kingdom	1. Don't Stop Me Now; 2. Bohemian Rhapsody 3. The Show Must Go On	Brian May
27 June 2008	46664	London	United Kingdom	1. Is This The World We Created? (With Andrea Corr)	Brian May
10 January 2009	We Will Rock You (Matinee Performance)	London	United Kingdom	1. Bohemian Rhapsody	Brian May
10 January 2009	We Will Rock You (Evening Performance)	London	United Kingdom	1. Bohemian Rhapsody	Brian May
25 March 2009	We Will Rock You Musical	Manchester	United Kingdom	1. Bohemian Rhapsody	Brian & Roger
18 May 2009	We Will Rock You Musical	London	United Kingdom	1. Bohemian Rhapsody; 2. The Show Must Go On	Brian May
11 June 2009	We Will Rock You Musical	Sunderland	United Kingdom	1. Bohemian Rhapsody	Brian May
2 July 2009	We Will Rock You Musical	Birmingham	United Kingdom	1. Bohemian Rhapsody	Brian & Roger
12 September 2009	We Will Rock You (Matinee Performance)	London	United Kingdom	1. Bohemian Rhapsody	Brian May
12 September 2009	We Will Rock You (Evening Performance)	London	United Kingdom	1. Bohemian Rhapsody; 2. The Show Must Go On	Brian May
17 September 2009	We Will Rock You Musical	Bristol	United Kingdom	1. Bohemian Rhapsody	Brian May
9 November 2009	We Will Rock You Musical	Edinburgh	United Kingdom	1. Bohemian Rhapsody	Brian & Roger
12 November 2009	We Will Rock You Musical	Stuttgart	Germany	1. Bohemian Rhapsody; 2. The Show Must Go On	Brian May
4 December 2009	We Will Rock You Musical	Milan	Italy	1. Bohemian Rhapsody	Brian May

== 2010s ==
=== Headlining Tours ===
==== Queen + Adam Lambert Tour 2012 ====
Title	Dates	Album	Continents	Shows	Band
Queen + Adam Lambert Tour 2012	30 June - 14 July 2012	N/A	Europe	6	Queen + Adam Lambert

==== Queen + Adam Lambert Tour 2014–2015 ====
Title	Dates	Album	Continents	Shows	Band
Queen + Adam Lambert Tour 2014–2015	19 June 2014 – 30 September 2015	N/A	North America Asia Oceania Europe South America	67	Queen + Adam Lambert

==== Queen + Adam Lambert 2016 Summer Festival Tour ====
Title	Dates	Album	Continents	Shows	Band
Queen + Adam Lambert 2016 Summer Festival Tour	19 June - 30 September 2016	N/A	Europe Asia	24	Queen + Adam Lambert

==== Queen + Adam Lambert Tour 2017–2018 ====
Title	Dates	Album	Continents	Shows	Band
Queen + Adam Lambert Tour 2017–2018	23 June 2017 – 22 September 2018	N/A	North America Europe Oceania	88	Queen + Adam Lambert

==== The Rhapsody Tour ====
Title	Dates	Album	Continents	Shows	Band
The Rhapsody Tour	10 July 2019 – 28 September 2019	N/A	North America	26	Queen + Adam Lambert

=== One-off performances ===
==== Music festivals ====
Date	Event	City	Country	Performed Songs	Band
20 September 2013	IHeartRadio Music Festival	Las Vegas	United States	1. Bohemian Rhapsody; 2. Another One Bites The Dust 3. Crazy Little Thing Called Love 4. Who Wants To Live Forever 5. Somebody To Love (With Fun) 6. Fat Bottomed Girls (With Fun) 7. Dragon Attack 8. Bohemian Rhapsody (Reprise) 9. We Will Rock You 10. We Are The Champions	Queen + Adam Lambert
28 September 2019	Global Citizen Festival	New York City	United States	1. Now I'm Here; 2. Don't Stop Me Now 3. Somebody To Love 4. Another One Bites The Dust 5. I Want It All 6. Love Of My Life 7. Crazy Little Thing Called Love 8. Under Pressure 9. Who Wants To Live Forever 10. Radio Ga Ga 11. Bohemian Rhapsody 12. We Will Rock You 13. We Are The Champions	Queen + Adam Lambert

==== Benefit concerts ====
Date	Event	City	Country	Songs Performed	Band
17 November 2010	Princes Trust Rock Gala	London	United Kingdom	1. These Are The Days Of Our Lives; 2. Last Horizon 3. It's A Hard Life (With Tom Chaplin); 4. Seven Seas Of Rhye (With Midge Ure) 5. We Will Rock You	Brian & Roger

==== Award shows ====
Date	Event	City	Country	Songs performed	Band
6 November 2011	2011 MTV Europe Music Awards	Belfast	United Kingdom	1. The Show Must Go On; 2. Under Pressure (Intro) 3. We Will Rock You 4. We Are The Champions)	Queen + Adam Lambert
24 February 2019	91st Academy Awards	Los Angeles	United States	1. We Will Rock You; 2. We Are The Champions	Queen + Adam Lambert

==== Television shows and specials ====
Date	Show	City	Country	Songs Performed	Band
10 January 2010	The Late Late Show	Dublin	Ireland	1. We Will Rock You (With We Will Rock You Cast); 2. We Are The Champions (With We Will Rock You Cast)	Brian & Roger
25 April 2012	American Idol	Los Angeles	United States	1. Fat Bottomed Girls (With Finalists); 2. Another One Bites The Dust (With Finalists) 3. We Will Rock You (With Finalists) 4. We Are The Champions (With Finalists)	Brian & Roger
26 April 2012	American Idol	Los Angeles	United States	1. Somebody To Love (With Queen Extravaganza)	Brian & Roger
30 November 2014	The X Factor	London	United Kingdom	1. Somebody To Love (With Finalists)	Queen + Adam Lambert
31 December 2014	New Years Eve Special	London	United Kingdom	1. Don't Stop Me Now; 2. I Want To Break Free 3. Somebody To Love 4. Another One Bites The Dust 5. Under Pressure 6. Fat Bottomed Girls 7. Radio Ga Ga 8. I Want It All 9. Crazy Little Thing Called Love 10. The Show Must Go On 11. Bohemian Rhapsody 12. Killer Queen 13. Bohemian Rhapsody (Reprise) 14. We Will Rock You 15. We Are The Champions	Queen + Adam Lambert
1 February 2017	The Late Late Show with James Corden	Los Angeles	United States	1. We Will Rock You; 2. Don't Stop Me Now (With James Corden) 3. Crazy Little Thing Called Love (With James Corden) 4. Another One Bites The Dust 5. Somebody To Love (With James Corden)	Queen + Adam Lambert
22 June 2017	Jimmy Kimmel Live!	Los Angeles	United States	1. I Want It All; 2. Don't Stop Me Now 3. Two Fux 4. Crazy Little Thing Called Love	Queen + Adam Lambert

==== Other performances ====
Date	Event	City	Country	Songs Performed	Band
5 September 2011	Freddie Mercury 65th Birthday Party	London	United Kingdom	1. Love Of My Life (With Kerry Ellis); 2. These Are The Days Of Our Lives 3. Under Pressure (With Patti Russo) 4. Good Old-Fashioned Lover Boy (With Matt Lucas) 5. Don't Stop Me Now (With David Armand); 6. Crazy Little Thing Called Love (With Ty Taylor and Mike Rutherford) 7. Say It's Not True (With Jeff Beck); 8. Little Wing (With Jeff Beck) 9. It's A Hard Life (With Tom Chaplin) 10. Tie Your Mother Down (With Jeff Beck and Kerry Ellis) 11. The Show Must Go On (With Tom Chaplin) 12. We Will Rock You (With We Will Rock You Cast)	Brian & Roger
12 August 2012	2012 Summer Olympics closing ceremony	London	United Kingdom	1. Brighton Rock (Only Brian); 2. We Will Rock You (With Jessie J)	Brian & Roger
16 June 2014	iHeart Radio Music Theatre (Promo Gig)	Los Angeles	United States	1. We Will Rock You; 2. Another One Bites The Dust 3. Crazy Little Thing Called Love 4. Love Kills 5. Fat Bottomed Girls 6. Under Pressure 7. We Are The Champions 8. Don't Stop Me Now	Queen + Adam Lambert
21 September 2019	Kym Rapier's Birthday Party	Florence	Italy	1. Now I'm Here; 2. Somebody To Love 3. Don't Stop Me Now 4. Another One Bites The Dust 5. I Want It All 6. Love Of My Life 7. Happy Birthday To You 8. Crazy Little Thing Called Love 9. Under Pressure 10. Who Wants To Live Forever 11. Fat Bottomed Girls 12. Radio Ga Ga 13. Bohemian Rhapsody 14. We Will Rock You 15. We Are The Champions	Queen + Adam Lambert

=== Guest Appearances ===
Date	Event	City	Country	Songs Performed	Band Member(s)
31 January 2010	We Will Rock You (Matinee Performance)	Dublin	Ireland	1. Bohemian Rhapsody	Brian May
31 January 2010	We Will Rock You (Evening Performance)	Dublin	Ireland	1. Bohemian Rhapsody	Brian May
10 May 2010	We Will Rock You Musical	London	United Kingdom	1. Bohemian Rhapsody	Brian & Roger
11 May 2010	Taylor Hawkins and the Coattail Riders	London	United Kingdom	1. In Your Shoes; 2. I'm In Love With Your Car 3. Sleeping On The Sidewalk 4. Long Away 5. Tenement Funster 6. Way Down	Brian & Roger
3 September 2010	We Will Rock You Musical	Utrecht	Netherlands	1. Bohemian Rhapsody	Brian May
4 September 2010	We Will Rock You (Matinee Performance)	London	United Kingdom	1. Bohemian Rhapsody	Brian May
4 September 2010	We Will Rock You (Evening Performance)	London	United Kingdom	1. Bohemian Rhapsody	Brian May
21 October 2010	We Will Rock You Musical	Berlin	Germany	1. Bohemian Rhapsody	Brian May
20 January 2011	We Will Rock You Musical	Glasgow	United Kingdom	1. Bohemian Rhapsody	Brian May
27 January 2011	We Will Rock You Musical	Oslo	Norway	1. Bohemian Rhapsody	Brian May
23 February 2011	We Will Rock You Musical	Copenhagen	Denmark	1. Bohemian Rhapsody	Roger Taylor
22 March 2011	We Will Rock You Musical	Cardiff	United Kingdom	1. Bohemian Rhapsody	Brian May
31 May 2011	We Will Rock You Musical	London	United Kingdom	1. Bohemian Rhapsody; 2. The Show Must Go On	Brian May
8 June 2011	We Will Rock You Musical	Aberdeen	United Kingdom	1. Bohemian Rhapsody	Brian May
7 July 2011	We Will Rock You Musical	Birmingham	United Kingdom	1. Bohemian Rhapsody	Brian May
11 July 2011	Foo Fighters	London	United Kingdom	1. Tie Your Mother Down	Brian & Roger
20 August 2011	We Will Rock You Musical	London	United Kingdom	1. Bohemian Rhapsody	Brian May
26 August 2011	Reading Festival	Reading	United Kingdom	1. We Will Rock You (With My Chemical Romance); 2. Welcome to the Black Parade (With My Chemical Romance)	Brian May
13 September 2011	We Will Rock You Musical	London	United Kingdom	1. We Will Rock You (With Melanie C); 2. We Are The Champions (With Melanie C)	Brian May
13 October 2011	We Will Rock You Musical	Bristol	United Kingdom	1. Bohemian Rhapsody	Brian May
1 December 2011	We Will Rock You Musical	Edinburgh	United Kingdom	1. Bohemian Rhapsody	Brian May
9 December 2011	Melanie C	London	United Kingdom	1. One Vision	Brian May
15 April 2012	Laurence Olivier Awards	London	United Kingdom	1. Bohemian Rhapsody (With We Will Rock You Cast)	Brian May
14 May 2012	We Will Rock You Musical	London	United Kingdom	1. Bohemian Rhapsody (Only Brian); 2. The Show Must Go On	Brian & Roger
27 March 2013	We Will Rock You Musical	Nottingham	United Kingdom	1. Bohemian Rhapsody	Brian May
5 October 2013	We Will Rock You Musical	London	United Kingdom	1. Bohemian Rhapsody	Brian May
15 October 2013	We Will Rock You Musical	Baltimore	United States	1. Bohemian Rhapsody	Brian May
12 December 2014	Helene Fischer Show	Berlin	Germany	1. Who Wants To Live Forever (With Helene Fischer); 2. I Want It All	Queen + Adam Lambert
16 March 2015	We Will Rock You Musical	Hamburg	Germany	1. Bohemian Rhapsody	Brian May
5 September 2015	Foo Fighters	Milton Keynes	United Kingdom	1. Under Pressure (With Foo Fighters and John Paul Jones)	Roger Taylor
26 August 2018	Cal Jam Festival	Los Angeles	United States	1. Under Pressure (With Chevy Metal & Foo Fighters)	Roger Taylor
2 February 2019	Super Saturday Night	Atlanta	United States	1. Under Pressure (With Foo Fighters)	Roger Taylor
24 June 2019	Starmus festival	Zurich	Switzerland	1. Who Wants To Live Forever (with Vittorio Grigolo); 2. '39 (Orchestrated) 3. We Are The Champions (with Vittorio Grigolo on vocals)	Brian May

== 2020s ==
=== Headlining tours ===
Title	Dates	Album	Continents	Shows	Band
The Rhapsody Tour	18 January 2020 – 14 February 2024	N/A	Asia North America Oceania Europe	83	Queen + Adam Lambert

=== One-off performances ===
Date	Event	City	Country	Songs Performed	Type	Band
16 February 2020	Fire Fight Australia	Sydney	Australia	1. Bohemian Rhapsody; 2. Radio Ga Ga 3. Hammer To Fall 4. Crazy Little Thing Called Love 5. We Will Rock You 6. We Are The Champions	Benefit concert	Queen + Adam Lambert
23 May 2022	Warm-Up Show	Bristol	United Kingdom	1. Tie Your Mother Down; 2. The Show Must Go On 3. Radio Ga Ga 4. Bohemian Rhapsody 5. We Will Rock You 6. We Are The Champions	N/A	Queen + Adam Lambert
4 June 2022	Platinum Party at the Palace	London	United Kingdom	1. We Will Rock You; 2. Don't Stop Me Now 3. We Are The Champions	Television shows and specials	Queen + Adam Lambert
3 September 2022	Taylor Hawkins Tribute Concert	London	United Kingdom	1. We Will Rock You (With Luke Spiller & Foo Fighters); 2. I'm In Love With My Car (With Foo Fighters) 3. Under Pressure (With Justin Hawkins & Foo Fighters); 4. Somebody To Love (With Sam Ryder & Foo Fighters) 5. Love Of My Life	N/A	Brian & Roger
29 September 2022	Taylor Hawkins Tribute Concert	Los Angeles	United States	1. We Will Rock You (With Justin Hawkins & Foo Fighters); 2. I'm In Love With My Car (With Foo Fighters) 3. Under Pressure (With Justin Hawkins & Foo Fighters) 4. Somebody To Love (With Pink and Foo Fighters) 5. Love Of My Life	N/A	Brian & Roger

=== Guest Appearances ===
Date	Event	City	Country	Songs Performed	Band Member(s)
5 June 2023	We Will Rock You Musical	London	United Kingdom	1. Bohemian Rhapsody	Brian May
7 June 2023	We Will Rock You Musical	London	United Kingdom	1. Bohemian Rhapsody	Brian May
27 August 2023	We Will Rock You Musical	London	United Kingdom	1. Bohemian Rhapsody	Brian May
15 May 2024	Stephen Hawking Medal Award Ceremony	Bratislava	Slovakia	1. The Miracle (with Celeste Buckingham); 2. Gone Away (with The Offspring) 3. Stone Cold Crazy (with The Offspring)	Brian May
19 July 2024	Andrea Bocelli 30: The Celebration	Lajatico	Italy	1. Because We Believe (with Andrea Bocelli); 2. Who Wants To Live Forever (with Andrea Bocelli)	Brian May
11 April 2025	Coachella 2025	Indio	United States	1. Bohemian Rhapsody (With Benson Boone); 2. Beautiful Things (With Benson Boone)	Brian May
22 May 2025	amfAR Gala	Cannes	France	1. Another One Bites The Dust (With Adam Lambert); 2. Crazy Little Thing Called Love (With Adam Lambert) 3. Under Pressure (With Adam Lambert)	Roger Taylor
13 September 2025	Last Night of the Proms	London	United Kingdom	1. Bohemian Rhapsody (Orchestrated)	Brian & Roger
4 November 2025	Benson Boone American Heart World Tour	London	United Kingdom	1. Bohemian Rhapsody (With Benson Boone); 2. Beautiful Things (With Benson Boone)	Brian May
15 March 2026	Benson Boone American Heart World Tour	Birmingham	United Kingdom	1. We Will Rock You (With Benson Boone); 2. We Are the Champions (With Benson Boone) 3. Beautiful Things (With Benson Boone)	Brian May

== Queen's line-up (live) ==
Queen (1970–1971)	Freddie Mercury – lead vocals, piano; Brian May – guitar, vocals; Roger Taylor – drums, percussion, vocals; Mike Grose – bass guitar (April–July 1970); Barry Mitchell – bass guitar (August 1970 – January 1971); Doug Bogie – bass guitar (February 1971)
Queen (1971–1981)	Freddie Mercury – lead vocals, piano, keyboards, rhythm guitar; Brian May – guitar, keyboards, piano, vocals, Roger Taylor – drums, percussion, vocals; John Deacon – bass guitar, backing vocals
Queen (1982–1986)	Freddie Mercury – lead vocals, piano, keyboards, rhythm guitar; Brian May – guitar, keyboards, piano, vocals; Roger Taylor – drums, percussion, vocals; John Deacon – bass guitar, guitar, backing vocals; With: Morgan Fisher – keyboards, piano (April–June 1982); Fred Mandel – keyboards, piano (July–November 1982); Spike Edney – keyboards, piano, rhythm guitar, backing vocals (1984–1986)
Queen + (1992–1997)	Brian May – guitar, keyboards, piano, vocals; Roger Taylor – drums, percussion, vocals; John Deacon – bass guitar, backing vocals; With: Spike Edney – keyboards, piano, guitar, backing vocals; and various other guests
Queen + (1997–present)	Brian May – guitar, keyboards, piano, vocals; Roger Taylor – drums, percussion, vocals; With: Spike Edney – keyboards, piano, guitar, backing vocals; David Grosman – bass guitar, backing vocals (1998–2004); Danny Miranda – bass guitar, backing vocals (2005–2009); Neil Fairclough – bass guitar, backing vocals (2009–present); and various other guests
Queen + Paul Rodgers (2005–2009)	Brian May – guitar, vocals; Roger Taylor – drums, percussion, vocals; Paul Rodgers – lead vocals, guitar, piano, harmonica; With: Spike Edney – keyboards, accordion, backing vocals; Jamie Moses – rhythm guitar, backing vocals; Danny Miranda – bass guitar, backing vocals; Neil Murray – bass guitar (14 & 16 October 2008 only)
Queen + Adam Lambert (2011–2017)	Brian May – guitar, vocals; Roger Taylor – drums, percussion, vocals; Adam Lambert – lead vocals; With: Spike Edney – keyboards, backing vocals; Rufus Tiger Taylor – percussion, drums, backing vocals; Neil Fairclough – bass guitar, backing vocals
Queen + Adam Lambert (2017–present)	Brian May – guitar, vocals; Roger Taylor – drums, percussion, vocals; Adam Lambert – lead vocals; With: Spike Edney – keyboards, backing vocals; Neil Fairclough – bass guitar, backing vocals; Tyler Warren – percussion, drums, backing vocals

== See also ==
- Concerts for the People of Kampuchea
- Rock in Rio
- Live Aid
- The Freddie Mercury Tribute Concert
- Party at the Palace
- 46664 Concerts
