= Queen Hyde Park 1976 =

1976 concert by Queen

Coordinates: 51.5083°N 0.1590°W

Queen concert in Hyde Park
- Concert by Queen
- Location: London, England
- Venue: Hyde Park
- Tour: Summer Gigs 1976
- Date: 18 September 1976
- Supporting acts: Kiki Dee, Steve Hillage, Supercharge
- Attendance: 150.000 – 200.000

Queen concert chronology
- Cardiff (10 Sept 1976); Hyde Park, London (18 Sept 1976); Milwaukee (13 Jan 1977)

Queen live in Hyde Park 1976 was a concert by the band Queen. The concert took place on 18 September 1976 in Hyde Park, London. It was part of a brief summer tour of the UK by the band; they also played in Edinburgh and Cardiff on this tour.

The Hyde Park gig was a free concert, which drew in a crowd of over 150,000, which was one of the largest audiences for any concert in London. The free concert was organised by Richard Branson, an entrepreneur at the time. The band intended to perform their usual encores of Now I'm Here, Big Spender and Jailhouse Rock, but the show had run a half hour past its scheduled ending time (a curfew strictly enforced by the authorities). The police threatened to arrest the band if they tried to go back on stage to play the encores, and Mercury was later quoted saying how he would prefer not to be stuck in a jail cell in his leotard, so the show was over after "In the Lap of the Gods... Revisited".

There is more than one audio source of this concert as well as a video. According to Roger Taylor, the drummer of Queen, the complete show was supposed to be shown on TV in early 1977 but was never aired. Since then, the full show has leaked out to the Internet, though in terrible quality. Over the years, some of the footage has been shown in various documentaries and there are rumors of a future official release. The 2011 reissue of A Day at the Races includes a performance of "You Take My Breath Away" from this date.

The rest of the day's music was provided by The Kiki Dee Band, Supercharge, The Rich Kids (not to be confused with Midge Ure's band of the same name), Broken Wreck Chords and Steve Hillage. Elton John did not appear duetting with Kiki Dee for "Don't Go Breaking My Heart". She sang to a 2/3 life-sized cardboard cut-out of Elton instead.

A post-concert review by Record Mirror linked the performance, and especially Brian May's appearance and style, to the death of Jimi Hendrix, exactly six years earlier on 18 September 1970, but stating that "Queen aren't Hendrix,...they're Freddie Mercury."

The concert was shot on videotape, then kinescoped onto 16 mm film. Reportedly, the film negatives have been damaged. However, snippets from a high quality videotape source appeared on the A Night at the Opera 30th Anniversary DVD.

== Setlist ==
1. "A Day at the Races (Intro)"
2. "Bohemian Rhapsody (Opera and Rock Section)"
3. "Ogre Battle"
4. "Sweet Lady"
5. "White Queen (As It Began)"
6. "Flick Of The Wrist"
7. "You're My Best Friend"
8. "Bohemian Rhapsody (Ballad)"
9. "Killer Queen"
10. "The March of the Black Queen"
11. "Bohemian Rhapsody (Reprise)"
12. "Bring Back That Leroy Brown"
13. "Brighton Rock"
14. "Son And Daughter (Reprise)"
15. "'39"
16. "You Take My Breath Away"
17. "The Prophet's Song"
18. "Stone Cold Crazy"
19. "Keep Yourself Alive"
20. "Liar"
21. "In the Lap of the Gods... Revisited"
