= 46664 =

Concerts honouring Nelson Mandela and his initial number while in prison

46664 was a series of AIDS benefit concerts played in honour of Nelson Mandela by South African and foreign musicians between 2003 and 2008.

== Origin ==
The second time that Mandela was imprisoned on Robben Island was in 1964, and he was the 466th prisoner that year. His prison number remained 466/64 until 1982, when he was transferred to Pollsmoor Prison and given the prison number 220/82. "Prisoner 46664" continues to be used as a reverential title for him. Shortly before Joe Strummer's death, he and U2's Bono co-wrote the song "46664" for Mandela as part of the campaign against AIDS in Africa.

== 46664 concerts ==
=== Cape Town, South Africa ===
On 29 November 2003, an event called the 46664 Concert was held at Green Point Stadium, Cape Town. It was hosted by Mandela and its goal was to raise awareness of the spread of HIV/AIDS in South Africa. The following artists performed:

- Anastacia
- Beyoncé Knowles
- Bob Geldof
- Queen (Brian May and Roger Taylor)
- Paul Oakenfold with Shifty Shellshock and TC
- Amampondo Drummers
- Baaba Maal
- Youssou N'Dour
- Yusuf Islam (Cat Stevens)
- Angelique Kidjo
- Bono and The Edge from U2
- Abdel Wright
- Chris Thompson, Zoe Nicholas, Treana Morris
- Yvonne Chaka Chaka
- Bongo Maffin
- Johnny Clegg
- Jimmy Cliff
- The Corrs
- Ladysmith Black Mambazo
- Eurythmics
- Danny K
- Watershed
- Zucchero
- Ms. Dynamite
- Andrew Bonsu
- Soweto Gospel Choir
- 9ice
- Peter Gabriel

Following the concert, three live CDs and a DVD titled "46664: The Event" were released.

=== George, South Africa ===
On 19 March 2005, another "annual" 46664 Concert was held at Fancourt Country Club and Golfing Estate, in George, South Africa with people like Katie Melua, Prime Circle, Annie Lennox, Juluka with Johnny Clegg and Queen + Paul Rodgers. Will Smith was the host.

=== Madrid, Spain ===
The first 46664 event to be staged in Europe took place from 29 April 2005 through to 1 May 2005 in Madrid, Spain. The concerts named "46664 Festival Madrid" focused on Spanish-speaking artists, as shown in the following list:

"Noche de Raices"

("Roots night", 29 April 2005)

- Falete
- Valderrama
- Diana Navarro
- José Mercé
- Queco
- La Tana
- Diego El Cigala
- Josemi Carmona
- Pepe Habichuela
- Pasión Vega
- Alberto Cortez
- Niña Pastori

"Noche de Pop"

("Pop night", 30 April 2005)

- Taxi
- No se lo digas a Mamá
- Beatriz Luengo
- Fábula
- Modestia Aparte
- Sybel
- La sonrisa de Julia
- El sueño de Morfeo
- El Canto del Loco
- Jarabe de Palo
- Mikel Erentxun
- Nacho García Vega
- Miguel Ríos
- Los Anónimos
- Danza Invisible
- Presuntos Implicados
- Loquillo y Trogloditas
- Iguana Tango
- Pereza
- Javier Gurruchaga

"Noche de Solistas"

("Singer-songwriter's night", 1 May 2005)

- Elena Bujedo
- Pedro Javier Hermosilla
- Carmen Paris
- Jorge Drexler
- Carlos Núñez
- Ismael Serrano
- Manolo García
- Sergio Dalma
- Zucchero

=== Tromsø, Norway ===
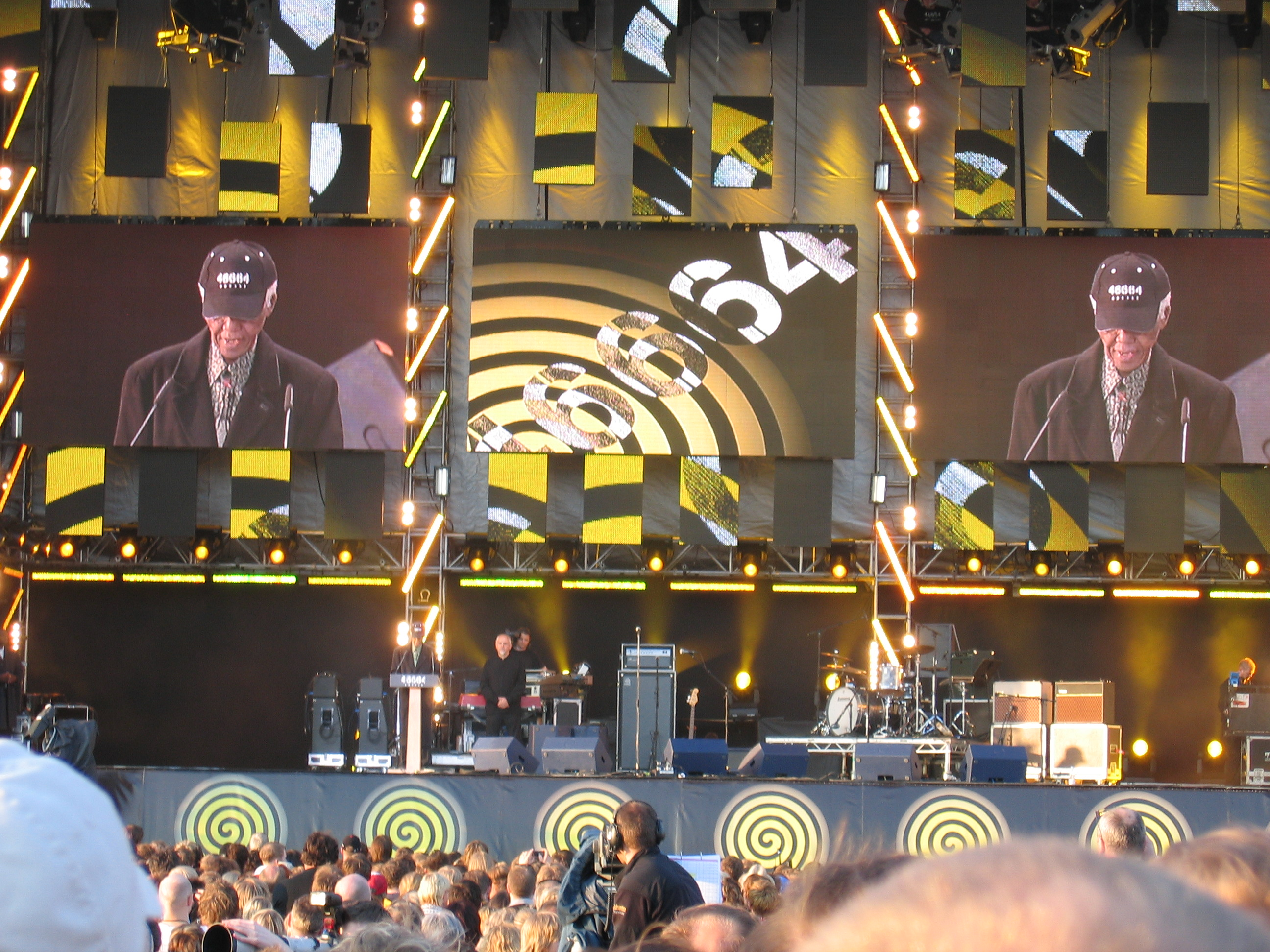
Nelson Mandela speaking in Tromsø.

On 11 June 2005, the 46664 Arctic Concert was held in Tromsø, Norway. The following artists performed:

- Anneli Drecker and Jane Kelly (NO)
- Adjagas and Lawra Somby
- Razorlight (UK)
- Kaizers Orchestra (NO)
- Bongo Maffin (ZA)
- Samsaya (IND/NO)
- Earth Affair (IS)
- Noora Noor (NO)
- Thomas Dybdahl (NO)
- Saybia (DK)
- Angelique Kidjo (DK)
- Peter Gabriel (UK)
- Robert Plant and Strange Sensation (UK)
- Mafikizolo (ZA)
- Madrugada (NO)
- Ane Brun (NO)
- Jivan Gasparyan
- House band with:
  - Annie Lennox (UK)
  - Brian May (UK)
  - Sharon Corr (IRL)
  - Zucchero (ITA)
- Sami
- Johnny Clegg (UK/ZA)

=== Johannesburg, South Africa ===
On 1 December 2007, International World AIDS Day, a third concert was held in Johannesburg, South Africa. The concert was hosted at Ellis Park, with tens of thousands of people in attendance. Peter Gabriel, Annie Lennox, Angelique Kidjo, Ludacris, Corinne Bailey Rae, Goo Goo Dolls, Razorlight, the Who, Prime Circle, Cassette and Jamelia performed for Nelson Mandela on stage. The event was streamed live on iclips.net. All technical services were supplied by the Gearhouse Group South Africa

=== London, United Kingdom ===
A concert celebrating Nelson Mandela's 90th birthday took place in London's Hyde Park on 27 June 2008.

Artists who performed at this special event included Jivan Gasparyan, Josh Groban, Zucchero, Queen + Paul Rodgers, Annie Lennox, Simple Minds, Jerry Dammers, Amy Winehouse, Amaral, the Who, Sugababes, Razorlight, Leona Lewis, Eddy Grant, Joan Baez and Jamelia. Will Smith opened the concert with his wife Jada Pinkett Smith. Smith later performed his song "Switch". Quincy Jones also made an appearance introducing Leona Lewis. Other celebrities who made an appearance include Lewis Hamilton, Geri Halliwell and Peter Gabriel.

Joining them were South African and African artists Johnny Clegg, Sipho Mabuse, Loyiso, Vusi Mahlasela, the Soweto Gospel Choir, AIDS orphan choir The Children of Agape (the subject of the award-winning film feature We Are Together), the legendary Papa Wemba, and Sudanese "war child" rapper Emmanuel Jal, among others.

A surprise guest, expected to be the Spice Girls, had been promised, but the girl group did not perform. Dame Shirley Bassey had been confirmed as a guest, but did not appear on advice from her doctors, following recent stomach surgery.

The concert was broadcast live online at Iclips.net and on Virgin Radio, and highlights shown on ITV1 (and MHD in the United States), hosted by Phillip Schofield and Fearne Cotton.

== See also ==
- Nelson Mandela 70th Birthday Tribute
- Nelson Mandela Day
- Nelson Mandela Foundation
