= Live at the Rainbow '74 =

Live album by Queen
- Released: 8 September 2014
- Recorded: 31 March; 19–20 November 1974; 1975 (overdubs); 2014 (pitch corrections)
- Venues: Rainbow Theatre, London, UK
- Genres: Hard rock, heavy metal
- Length: 79:55 (1CD); 144:10 (2CD)
- Labels: Virgin EMI; Hollywood
- Producers: Justin Shirley-Smith; Josh Macrae; Kris Fredriksson

Queen chronology
| Icon (2013) | Live at the Rainbow '74 (2014) | Queen Forever (2014) |

Live at the Rainbow '74 is a live album by the British rock band Queen released on 8 September 2014.

== Release and content ==
The album was released in single CD, double CD, DVD, SD Blu-ray and quadruple vinyl formats, as well as a deluxe box set including reproduction tour memorabilia. The single disc and video editions contain a concert from the band's Sheer Heart Attack Tour, recorded live at the Rainbow Theatre in London on 19 & 20 November 1974, while the double CD and vinyl releases include this material plus a concert recorded at the Rainbow earlier in the year, on 31 March, as part of the Queen II Tour. That concert was originally recorded with the intention of being released as a live album after the band's third album, "Sheer Heart Attack", but was later shelved after being mixed and produced, although it was later bootlegged over the coming decades. The DVD and Blu-ray also include four bonus tracks from the earlier Queen II concert.

The video footage was previously released as Live at the Rainbow, a half-hour film containing footage from both November shows. It was shown in cinemas in the 1970s and 1980s as an opener to films, including longer concert films by Led Zeppelin and Pink Floyd, as well as the release of Jaws 2 in British cinemas. More footage from the November shows was later released on VHS as part of the Box of Tricks box set on 26 May 1992, though this footage was heavily overdubbed. The 2014 release removes most of the overdubs, however it employs the use of manual pitch correction in some areas. This extends to the March concert as well, which had its' original overdubs removed and replaced with pitch correction.

One song from the album was previously available as audio. "Stone Cold Crazy" was released as a b-side to "The Miracle" single in 1989. Two tracks, "Big Spender" and "Bama Lama Lama Loo", both covers, were recorded at the March concert but are omitted from all releases.

Professional ratings
Review scores
| Source | Rating |
|---|---|
| Classic Rock | 8/10 |
| Mojo | 4/5 stars |
| PopMatters | 9/10 |

== Track listing ==
=== Single CD/DVD/SD Blu-ray (November concerts) ===
| No. | Title | Writer(s) | Length |
|---|---|---|---|
| 1. | "Procession" | May | 1:18 |
| 2. | "Now I'm Here" | May | 5:00 |
| 3. | "Ogre Battle" | Mercury | 5:31 |
| 4. | "Father to Son" | May | 5:55 |
| 5. | "White Queen (As It Began)" | May | 5:34 |
| 6. | "Flick of the Wrist" | Mercury | 4:07 |
| 7. | "In the Lap of the Gods" | Mercury | 3:20 |
| 8. | "Killer Queen" | Mercury | 1:26 |
| 9. | "The March of the Black Queen" | Mercury | 1:36 |
| 10. | "Bring Back That Leroy Brown" | Mercury | 1:41 |
| 11. | "Son and Daughter" | May | 3:45 |
| 12. | "Guitar Solo" | May | 4:41 |
| 13. | "Son and Daughter" (Reprise) | May | 2:14 |
| 14. | "Keep Yourself Alive" | May | 2:23 |
| 15. | "Drum Solo" | Taylor | 0:51 |
| 16. | "Keep Yourself Alive" (Reprise) | May | 1:23 |
| 17. | "Seven Seas of Rhye" | Mercury | 3:30 |
| 18. | "Stone Cold Crazy" | Mercury, May, Taylor, Deacon | 2:40 |
| 19. | "Liar" | Mercury | 8:39 |
| 20. | "In the Lap of the Gods... Revisited" | Mercury | 4:10 |
| 21. | "Big Spender" | Cy Coleman, Dorothy Fields | 1:31 |
| 22. | "Modern Times Rock 'N' Roll" | Taylor | 3:12 |
| 23. | "Jailhouse Rock" | Jerry Leiber, Mike Stoller | 4:10 |
| 24. | "God Save the Queen" | Traditional, arr. May | 1:18 |

==== DVD/SD Blu-ray Bonus (March concert) ====
| No. | Title | Length |
|---|---|---|
| 1. | "Son and Daughter" | 3:31 |
| 2. | "Guitar Solo" | 2:25 |
| 3. | "Son and Daughter" (Reprise) | 2:02 |
| 4. | "Modern Times Rock 'N' Roll" | 2:41 |

=== Double CD/Quadruple vinyl ===
==== Disc one (Queen II tour) ====
Side one
| No. | Title | Writer(s) | Length |
|---|---|---|---|
| 1. | "Procession" | May | 1:15 |
| 2. | "Father to Son" | May | 6:08 |
| 3. | "Ogre Battle" | Mercury | 5:27 |
| 4. | "Son and Daughter" | May | 3:31 |
| 5. | "Guitar Solo" | May | 2:25 |
| 6. | "Son and Daughter" (Reprise) | May | 2:02 |

Side two
| No. | Title | Writer(s) | Length |
|---|---|---|---|
| 7. | "White Queen (As It Began)" | May | 5:49 |
| 8. | "Great King Rat" | Mercury | 7:05 |
| 9. | "The Fairy Feller's Master-Stroke" | Mercury | 2:52 |

Side three
| No. | Title | Writer(s) | Length |
|---|---|---|---|
| 10. | "Keep Yourself Alive" | May | 2:10 |
| 11. | "Drum Solo" | Taylor | 0:28 |
| 12. | "Keep Yourself Alive" (Reprise) | May | 1:24 |
| 13. | "Seven Seas of Rhye" | Mercury | 3:10 |
| 14. | "Modern Times Rock 'N' Roll" | Taylor | 2:41 |
| 15. | "Jailhouse Rock / Stupid Cupid / Be-Bop-A-Lula / Jailhouse Rock" (Reprise) | Leiber, Stoller/Howard Greenfield, Neil Sedaka/Gene Vincent, Donald Graves, Bill "Sheriff Tex" Davis | 4:32 |

Side four
| No. | Title | Writer(s) | Length |
|---|---|---|---|
| 16. | "Liar" | Mercury | 8:28 |
| 17. | "See What a Fool I've Been" | May | 4:59 |

==== Disc two (Sheer Heart Attack tour) ====
Side one
| No. | Title | Writer(s) | Length |
|---|---|---|---|
| 1. | "Procession" | May | 1:17 |
| 2. | "Now I'm Here" | May | 4:57 |
| 3. | "Ogre Battle" | Mercury | 5:30 |
| 4. | "Father to Son" | May | 5:54 |

Side two
| No. | Title | Writer(s) | Length |
|---|---|---|---|
| 5. | "White Queen (As It Began)" | May | 5:33 |
| 6. | "Flick of the Wrist" | Mercury | 4:05 |
| 7. | "In the Lap of the Gods" | Mercury | 3:17 |
| 8. | "Killer Queen" | Mercury | 1:25 |
| 9. | "The March of the Black Queen" | Mercury | 1:35 |
| 10. | "Bring Back That Leroy Brown" | Mercury | 1:39 |

Side three
| No. | Title | Writer(s) | Length |
|---|---|---|---|
| 11. | "Son and Daughter" | May | 3:44 |
| 12. | "Guitar Solo" | May | 4:41 |
| 13. | "Son and Daughter" (Reprise) | May | 2:14 |
| 14. | "Keep Yourself Alive" | May | 2:22 |
| 15. | "Drum Solo" | Taylor | 0:51 |
| 16. | "Keep Yourself Alive" (Reprise) | May | 1:24 |
| 17. | "Seven Seas of Rhye" | Mercury | 3:28 |
| 18. | "Stone Cold Crazy" | Mercury, May, Taylor, Deacon | 2:39 |

Side four
| No. | Title | Writer(s) | Length |
|---|---|---|---|
| 19. | "Liar" | Mercury | 8:39 |
| 20. | "In the Lap of the Gods... Revisited" | Mercury | 4:09 |
| 21. | "Big Spender" | Coleman, Fields | 1:31 |
| 22. | "Modern Times Rock 'N' Roll" | Taylor | 3:11 |
| 23. | "Jailhouse Rock" | Leiber, Stoller | 4:07 |
| 24. | "God Save the Queen" | Trad., arr. May | 1:16 |

=== 2-LP Vinyl Edition ===
LP 1 (Queen II tour)

Side one
| No. | Title | Writer(s) | Length |
|---|---|---|---|
| 1. | "Procession" | May | 1:15 |
| 2. | "Father to Son" | May | 6:08 |
| 3. | "Ogre Battle" | Mercury | 5:27 |
| 4. | "Son and Daughter" | May | 3:30 |
| 5. | "Guitar Solo" | May | 2:25 |
| 6. | "Son and Daughter" (Reprise) | May | 2:02 |
| 7. | "Keep Yourself Alive" | May | 2:10 |
| 8. | "Drum Solo" | Taylor | 0:28 |
| 9. | "Keep Yourself Alive" (Reprise) | May | 1:24 |

Side two
| No. | Title | Writer(s) | Length |
|---|---|---|---|
| 10. | "Seven Seas of Rhye" | Mercury | 3:10 |
| 11. | "Modern Times Rock 'N' Roll" | Taylor | 2:41 |
| 12. | "Liar" | Mercury | 8:28 |

LP 2 (Sheer Heart Attack tour)

Side three
| No. | Title | Writer(s) | Length |
|---|---|---|---|
| 13. | "Procession" | May | 1:18 |
| 14. | "Now I'm Here" | May | 4:47 |
| 15. | "White Queen (As It Began)" | May | 5:34 |
| 16. | "Flick of the Wrist" | Mercury | 4:06 |

Side four
| No. | Title | Writer(s) | Length |
|---|---|---|---|
| 17. | "In the Lap of the Gods" | Mercury | 3:17 |
| 18. | "Killer Queen" | Mercury | 1:25 |
| 19. | "The March of the Black Queen" | Mercury | 1:35 |
| 20. | "Bring Back That Leroy Brown" | Mercury | 1:40 |
| 21. | "Stone Cold Crazy" | Mercury, May, Taylor, Deacon | 2:40 |
| 22. | "In the Lap of the Gods... Revisited" | Mercury | 4:10 |

== Personnel ==
- Freddie Mercury – lead vocals, piano, tambourine on "Liar" and "Keep Yourself Alive"
- Brian May – guitar, backing vocals, ukulele on "Bring Back That Leroy Brown"
- Roger Taylor – drums, percussion, backing vocals, co-lead vocals on 9
- John Deacon – bass guitar, backing vocals on 8, 12, 14, 19, 20, triangle on "Killer Queen"

== Charts ==
| Chart (2014) | Peak position |
|---|---|
| Austrian Albums (Ö3 Austria) | 12 |
| Belgian Albums (Ultratop Flanders) | 22 |
| Belgian Albums (Ultratop Wallonia) | 13 |
| Dutch Albums (Album Top 100) | 7 |
| Finnish Albums (Suomen virallinen lista) | 40 |
| French Albums (SNEP) | 55 |
| German Albums (Offizielle Top 100) | 9 |
| Hungarian Albums (MAHASZ) | 34 |
| Irish Albums (IRMA) | 54 |
| Italian Albums (FIMI) | 15 |
| Polish Albums (ZPAV) | 31 |
| Portuguese Albums (AFP) | 22 |
| Scottish Albums (Official Charts) | 12 |
| Spanish Albums (Promusicae) | 17 |
| Swiss Albums (Schweizer Hitparade) | 19 |
| UK Albums (Official Charts) | 11 |
| US Billboard 200 | 66 |
| US Top Hard Rock Albums (Billboard) | 5 |
| US Top Rock Albums (Billboard) | 24 |
| US Billboard Music Video Sales | 2 |

== Release history ==
| Region | Date | Label |
|---|---|---|
| United Kingdom | 8 September 2014 | Virgin EMI |
| Canada | 9 September 2014 | Hollywood |
| United States | 9 September 2014 | Hollywood |
