= Icon (Queen album) =

Compilation album by Queen
- Released: 11 June 2013
- Recorded: 1974–1991
- Genre: Rock
- Length: 42:35
- Label: Hollywood
- Producer: Various

Queen chronology
Hungarian Rhapsody: Queen Live in Budapest (2012)	Icon (2013)	Live at the Rainbow '74 (2014)

Icon is a compilation album by British rock band Queen, released on 11 June 2013 by Hollywood Records. The album was only released in the United States and Canada as a limited edition release.

== Track listing ==
No.	Title	Writer(s)	Length
1.	"Stone Cold Crazy"	John Deacon, Brian May, Freddie Mercury, Roger Taylor	2:14
2.	"Tie Your Mother Down"	May	4:50
3.	"Fat Bottomed Girls"	May	4:16
4.	"Another One Bites the Dust"	Deacon	3:34
5.	"We Will Rock You"	May	2:02
6.	"We Are the Champions"	Mercury	3:02
7.	"Radio Ga Ga"	Taylor	5:46
8.	"Bohemian Rhapsody"	Mercury	5:55
9.	"I'm in Love with My Car"	Taylor	3:05
10.	"I Want It All"	Queen (May)	4:40
11.	"The Show Must Go On"	Queen (May)	4:32

== Charts ==
=== Weekly charts ===
Chart (2013–2014)	Peak position
Canadian Albums (Billboard)	8
US Top Hard Rock Albums (Billboard)	22

=== Year-end charts ===
Chart (2014)	Position
Canadian Albums (Billboard)	18

== Certifications ==
Region	Certification	Certified units/sales
Canada (Music Canada)	Platinum	80,000^{^}
^{^} Shipments figures based on certification alone.
