= 46664 (song) =

"46664 (Long Walk to Freedom)"

Single by Bono and Joe Strummer

from the album 46664 - Part 2 Long Walk to Freedom
- Released: 21 October 2003
- Genre: Stadium rock
- Length: 6:25
- Songwriter(s): Bono; Joe Strummer; Dave Stewart

"46664 (Long Walk to Freedom)", also known as just "46664", is a 2004 song by U2 vocalist Bono and Clash guitarist Joe Strummer, released as part of a series of albums called 46664, both named after Nelson Mandela's prisoner number after his 1964 arrest. The album version, released as a single on 21 October 2003, was originally intended to be performed with Strummer before his death in 2002. Instead, the song was performed by Bono along with Eurythmics multi-instrumentalist Dave Stewart, U2 guitarist the Edge, Senegalese politician and musician Youssou N'Dour, and Abdel Wright. The albums came along with a concert also called 46664 which honored Mandela and benefitted charitable efforts against HIV/AIDS in South Africa. Bono and Strummer wrote the song with Stewart and performed it with the album lineup at the 46664 concert at Green Point Stadium in Cape Town on 29 November 2003, a recording of which was featured on the 46664 the Event live album and concert DVD.

== Background ==
Per a 2002 interview from shortly after Strummer's death, Bono explained that the original plan for the song was for Strummer to sing the verses and Bono would sing the chorus over "a hi-life music bed that Dave Stewart and some African musicians are doing". Strummer had sent some lyrics to Bono, who described them as "great, really honest, just like the Clash at their finest", and called Strummer "a town crier of a voice".

== Live performance ==
In an interview for Mandela Day 2009, Dave Stewart recalled the performance of the song and how right after, Mandela walked out on stage, wearing his 46664 prison uniform, and delivered a speech "about turning this number into a positive movement and had most people in tears."

== Style ==
In a review of the concert DVD, DVD Talk's Gil Jawetz says the song "has a nice atmosphere and features a cool reggae section by Abdel Wright". In the book How to Think Like Mandela, Daniel Smith says the song would be good "for fans of stadium rock".
