= La Tana =

Spanish singer

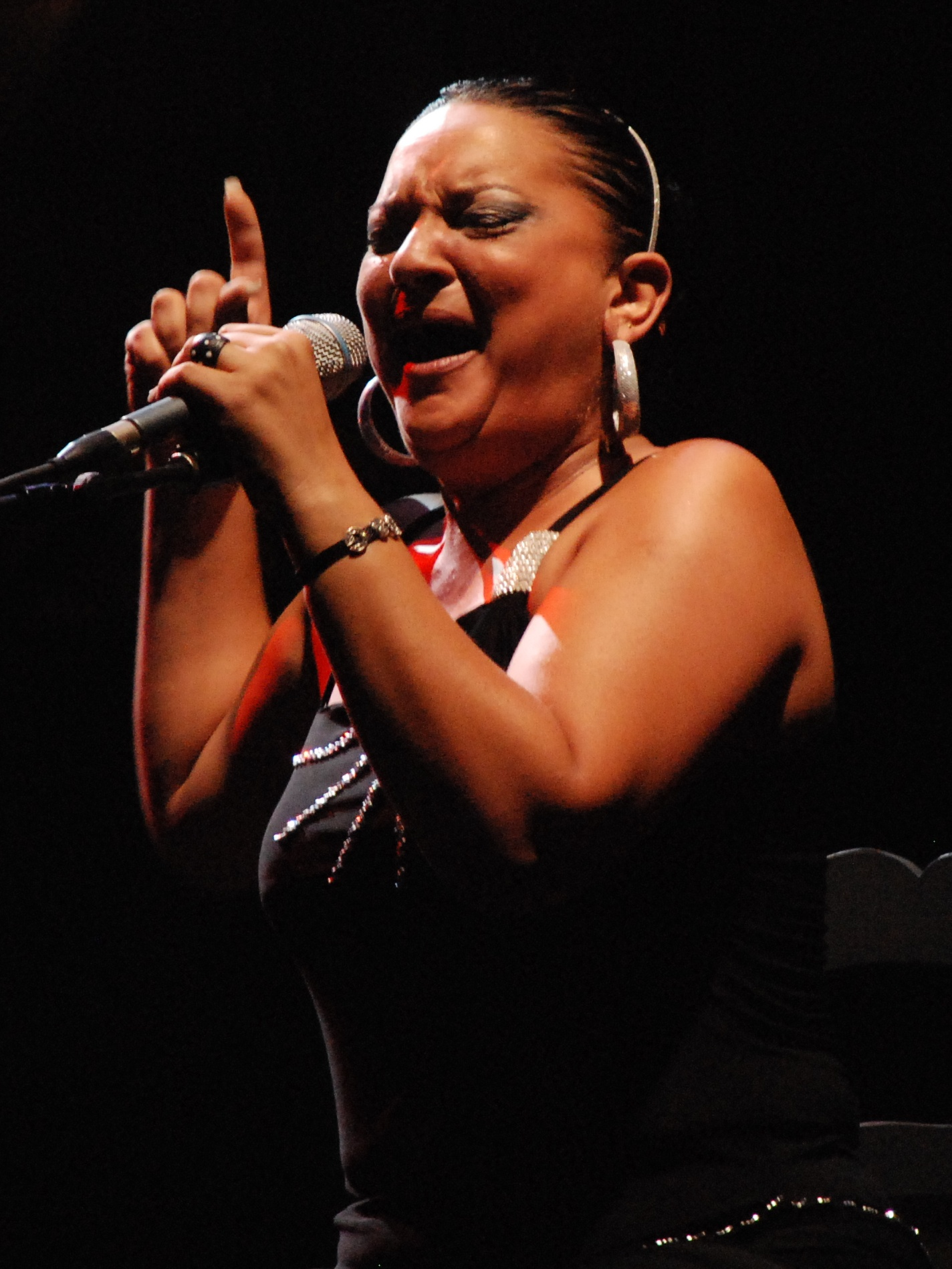
- La Tana in September 2007

Background information
- Born: Victoria Santiago Borja; 1976 (age 49–50); Seville, Spain

Victoria Santiago Borja (born 1976), known professionally as La Tana, is a Spanish flamenco singer.

== Biography ==
Victoria Santiago Borja was born in Seville in 1976. Her mother, Herminia Borja, is also a singer. She signed with V2 Spain in 2004. La Tana's debut solo album, Tú, ven a mí (2006), was produced by Paco de Lucía. In addition to touring with De Lucia during most summer months across Europe, she has travelled with the companies of Joaquín Cortés and Farruquito.
