= Bournemouth Winter Gardens =

Former theatre in Bournemouth, England

Coordinates: 50.7177°N 1.8800°W

Bournemouth Winter Gardens was a theatre located in Bournemouth, Dorset, England. It was first constructed in 1875 as an exhibition centre, but reopened in 1893 as a popular classical music venue. It was demolished and replaced just prior to World War II and became a popular rock music venue in the 1960s. The building was closed in 2002 and demolished in 2006. The site is currently awaiting redevelopment.

== History ==
The original building was a glass-clad structure constructed in 1875, similar to the Crystal Palace in London. It was appropriately named the Crystal Palace of the Summer and Winter Gardens with a capacity of 4,000. An 1891 prospectus said "These delightful grounds lie in the very bull’s eye of alluring Bournemouth". The lease was transferred to Bournemouth Corporation two years later, with Dan Godfrey starting a new Bournemouth Band around this time.

The initial exhibitions were not popular enough to keep the business afloat, and after several closures and re-openings it was decided to try and make it a dedicated music venue. It was first used as a concert hall in 1893, and meant that Bournemouth was the first municipal town to regularly provide music. Visiting conductors included Edward Elgar, Hubert Parry, Jean Sibelius and Gustav Holst. The building was home to the Bournemouth Municipal Orchestra between 1895 and 1929, after which time concerts were transferred to Pavilion Theatre (Bournemouth).

This structure was demolished in 1935 and replaced by a conventional brick building two years later, originally designed as a bowling centre. After World War II, the building was adapted for use as a concert hall as it had good acoustics. Along with other entertainment, it was the principal performing venue of the Municipal Orchestra until 1954. The renamed Bournemouth Symphony Orchestra remained in residence until 1979, when the orchestra moved its concerts to The Lighthouse.

The Winter Gardens was popular with pop and rock groups from the 1960s onward. The Beatles performed at the Winter Gardens on 16 November 1963, and the show was filmed by CBS that was telecast a week later. The Rolling Stones played the venue on 23 August 1964; the planned support group, The Paramounts missed the gig due to a van breakdown. Jimi Hendrix performed at the Winter Gardens in 1967, T. Rex, Deep Purple and King Crimson in 1971, Pink Floyd in 1972, Elton John in both 1972 and 1973, David Bowie, Mott the Hoople and Wings in 1973 and Queen in 1974. Whitesnake and Magnum (band) played the venue in November 1978.

Rolf Harris had a summer residence at the Gardens, as did Morecambe and Wise, Bob Hope and Jack Benny. The venue also occasionally showed films and wrestling matches. In 1997, the theatre saw a meeting of football fans concerned with saving the debt-ridden A.F.C. Bournemouth. However, by this time, the theatre was in decline. Music groups preferred bigger venues and there was an excessive number of theatres in the town.

== Redevelopment ==
The Winter Gardens closed in 2002 and the building was demolished in 2006. The site is used as a car park, pending redevelopment. In 2014, the council announced plans to build an entertainment centre and restaurants on the site. In December 2021, the remaining buildings on the site were demolished, awaiting redevelopment.
