= Queen Extravaganza =

2012–16 concert tour by Queen Extravaganza

Queen Extravaganza Band
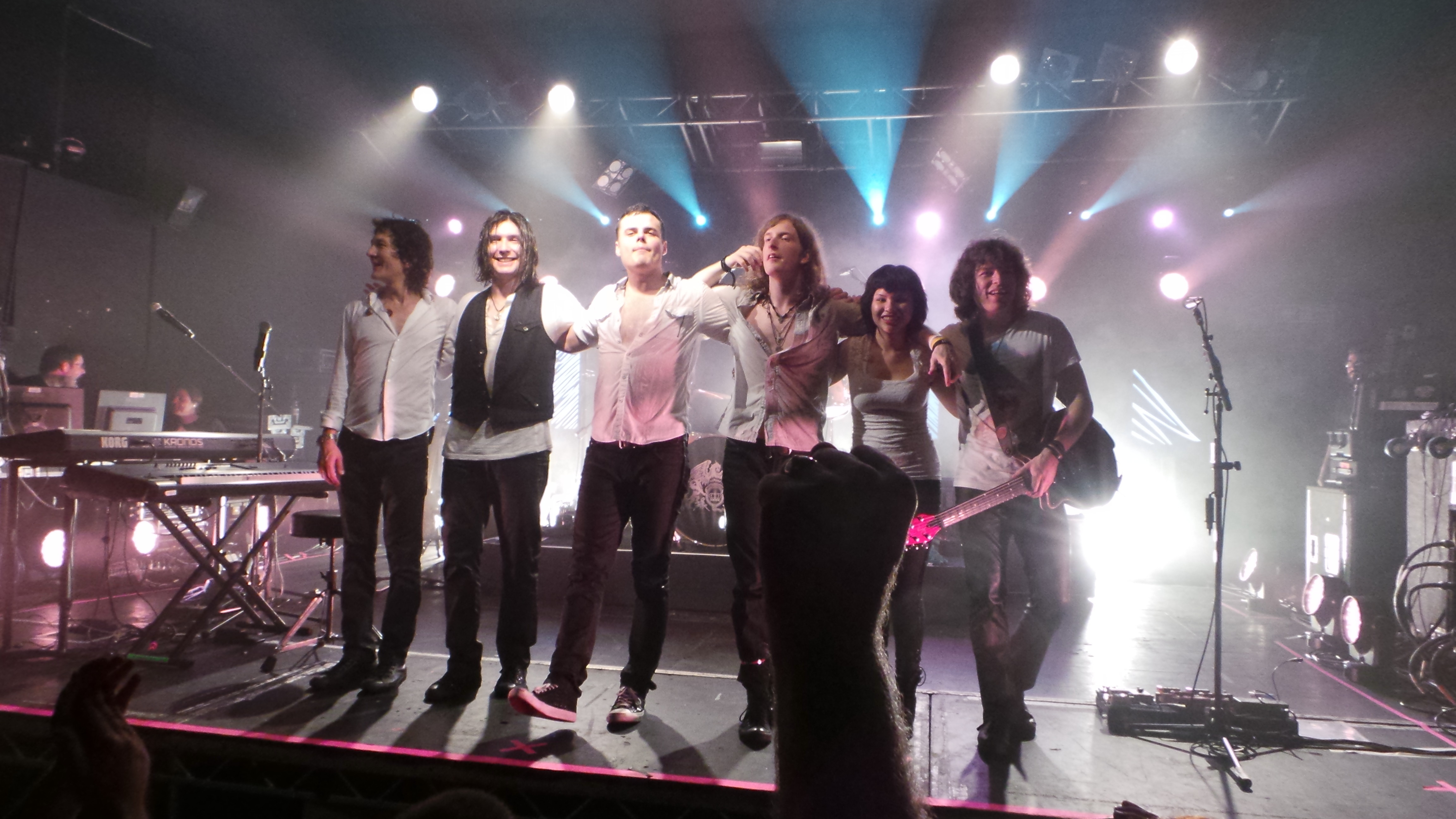
- Queen Extravaganza in 2014

Queen Extravaganza is an official tribute band for Queen.

== Background ==
Queen Extravaganza was Queen's official tribute band, developed by the band's original drummer, Roger Taylor. The original band members were selected from an online audition process.

It was announced on March 28, 2012, that Queen Extravaganza would tour North America visiting twenty-six cities in the United States and Canada.

On October 26, 2012, a second tour of North America was announced via QueenOnline.com.

== Setlists ==
2012 Setlist
1. "We Will Rock You (Fast)"
2. "Tie Your Mother Down"
3. "Now I'm Here"
4. "Killer Queen"
5. "Love of My Life"
6. "I Want It All"
7. "Bicycle Race"
8. "I Want to Break Free"
9. "The March Of the Black Queen"
10. "Dragon Attack"
11. "You Take My Breath Away"
12. "Save Me"
13. "Crazy Little Thing Called Love"
14. "Lazing on a Sunday Afternoon"
15. "I'm in Love with My Car"
16. "Bohemian Rhapsody"

Intermission

17. "One Vision"
18. "A Kind of Magic"
19. "Don't Stop Me Now"
20. "Under Pressure"
21. "Who Wants to Live Forever"
22. "Another One Bites the Dust"
23. "You're My Best Friend"
24. "Seven Seas of Rhye"
25. "Drum solo"
26. "Stone Cold Crazy"
27. "In the Lap of the Gods"
28. "In the Lap of the Gods... Revisited"
29. "Radio Ga Ga"
30. "Fat Bottomed Girls"
31. "Somebody to Love"

Encore

32. "We Will Rock You"
33. "We Are the Champions"
2013 Setlist
1. "We Will Rock You (Fast)"
2. "Killer Queen"
3. "I Want to Break Free"
4. "Dragon Attack"
5. "Crazy Little Thing Called Love"
6. "Love of My Life"
7. "Don't Stop Me Now"
8. "Lazing on a Sunday Afternoon"
9. "I'm in Love with My Car"
10. "Bohemian Rhapsody"
11. "Under Pressure"
12. "A Kind of Magic"
13. "You're My Best Friend"
14. "Drum solo"
15. "Stone Cold Crazy"
16. "Another One Bites the Dust"
17. "The Show Must Go On
18. "Radio Ga Ga"
19. "Fat Bottomed Girls"
20. "Somebody to Love"

Encore

21. ""Tie Your Mother Down""
22. "We Will Rock You"
23. "We Are the Champions"
2014 Setlist
1. "We Will Rock You (Fast)"
2. "Killer Queen"
3. "I Want to Break Free"
4. "Don't Stop Me Now"
5. "Love of My Life"
6. "Dragon Attack"
7. "Crazy Little Thing Called Love"
8. "Lazing on a Sunday Afternoon"
9. "I'm in Love with My Car"
10. "Bohemian Rhapsody"
11. "Under Pressure"
12. "A Kind of Magic"
13. "I Want It All"
14. "You're My Best Friend"
15. "Stone Cold Crazy"
16. "Another One Bites the Dust"
17. "The Show Must Go On"
18. "Radio Ga Ga"
19. "Fat Bottomed Girls"
20. "Somebody to Love"

Encore

21. ""Tie Your Mother Down""
22. "We Will Rock You"
23. "We Are the Champions"
A Night at the Opera 40th Anniversary Tour 2015

pre-A Night at the Opera:

1. "Now I'm Here"
2. "Keep Yourself Alive"
3. "The March of the Black Queen"
4. "Seven Seas of Rhye"
5. "In the Lap of the Gods"
6. "Killer Queen"
7. "Tenement Funster"
8. "Flick of the Wrist"
9. "Lily of the Valley"
10. "Stone Cold Crazy"
11. "Liar"
12. "In the Lap of the Gods... Revisited"

A Night at the Opera:

13. "Death on Two Legs (Dedicated to...)"
14. "Lazing on a Sunday Afternoon"
15. "I'm in Love with My Car"
16. "You're My Best Friend"
17. "'39"
18. "Sweet Lady" (feat. "drum solo")
19. "Seaside Rendezvous"
20. "The Prophet's Song"
21. "Love of My Life"
22. "Good Company"
23. "Bohemian Rhapsody"
24. "God Save the Queen"

Encore:

25. "Somebody to Love"
A Night at the Opera 2016

A Night at the Opera:

1. "Death on Two Legs (Dedicated to...)"
2. "Lazing on a Sunday Afternoon"
3. "I'm in Love with My Car"
4. "You're My Best Friend"
5. "'39"
6. "Sweet Lady"
7. "Seaside Rendezvous"
8. "The Prophet's Song"
9. "Love of My Life"
10. "Good Company"
11. "Bohemian Rhapsody"
12. "God Save the Queen"

post-A Night at the Opera:

13. "Tie Your Mother Down"
14. "Seven Seas of Rhye"
15. "Don't Stop Me Now"
16. "Stone Cold Crazy"
17. "Another One Bites The Dust"
18. "Save me"
19. "I Was Born To Love You"
20. "Under Pressure "
21. "Fat Bottomed Girls"
22. "The Show Must Go On"
23. "Radio Ga Ga"
24. Somebody to Love"

Encore:

25. "We Will Rock You"
26. "We Are The Champions"

== Tour dates ==
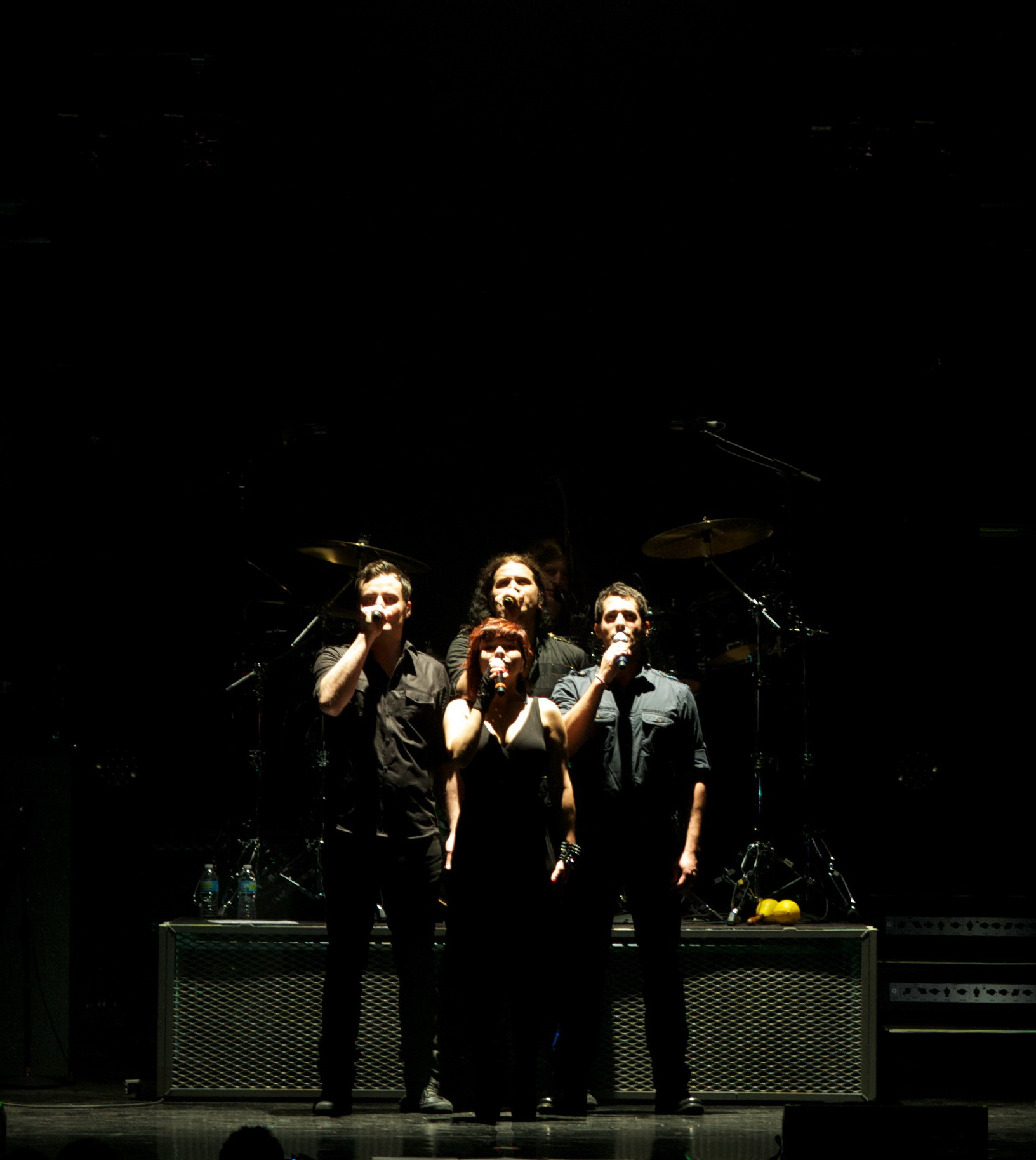
The Queen Extravaganza performing "Bohemian Rhapsody" at the Fox Theatre in 2012

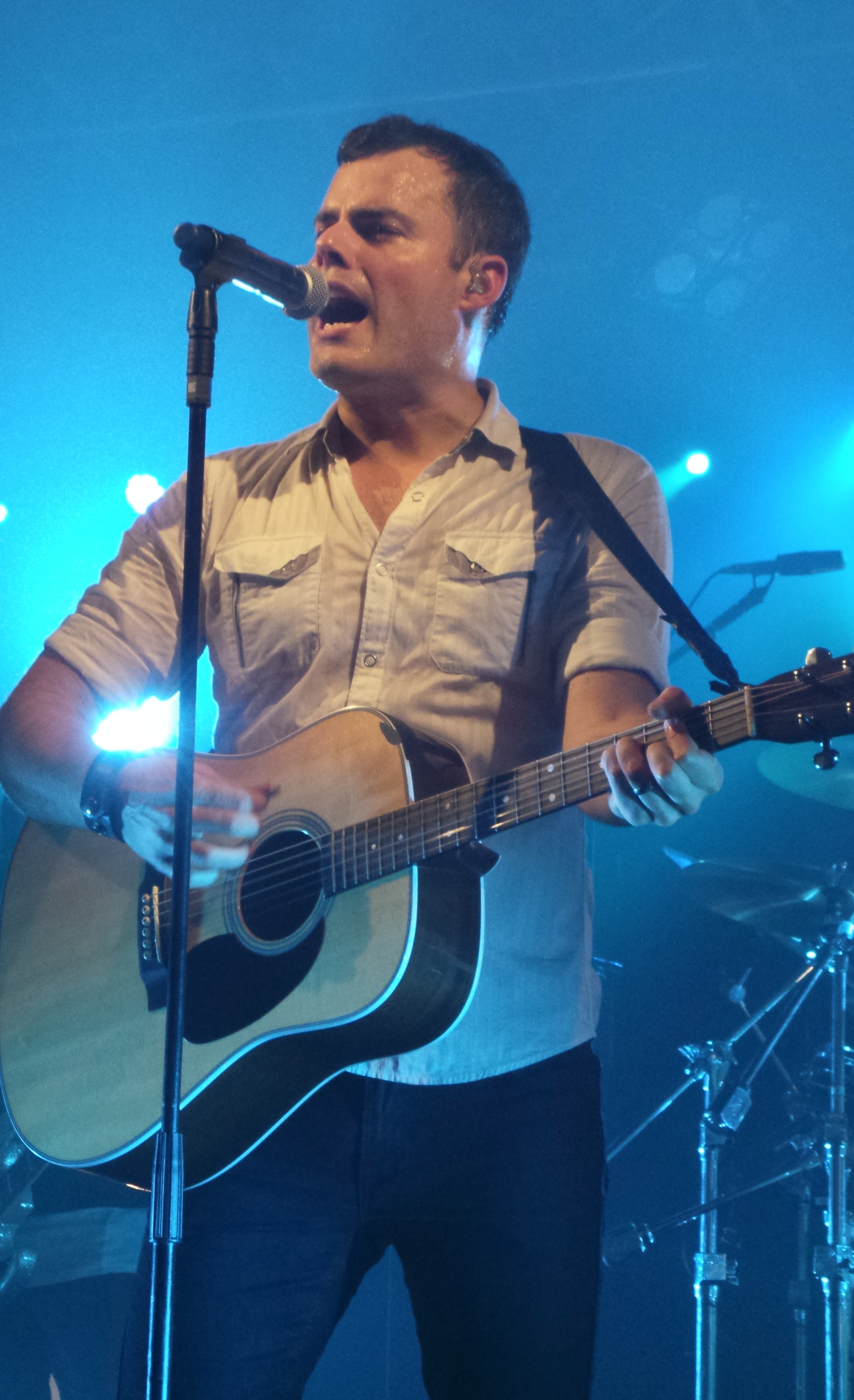
Marc Martel performing in the Queen Extravaganza Tour at the O2 Academy Oxford in 2013

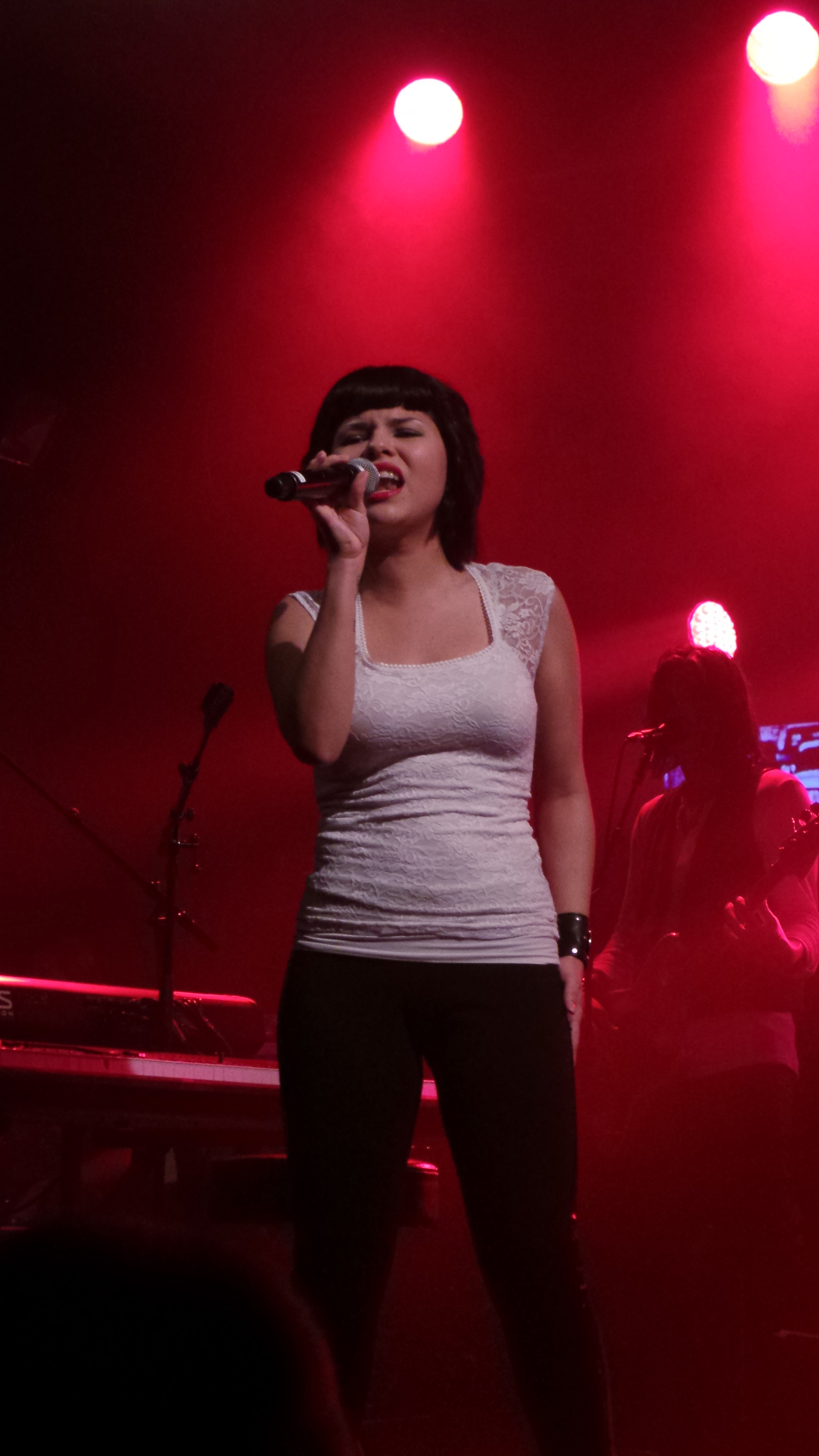
Jennifer Espinoza performing in the Queen Extravaganza Tour at the O2 Academy Oxford in 2013

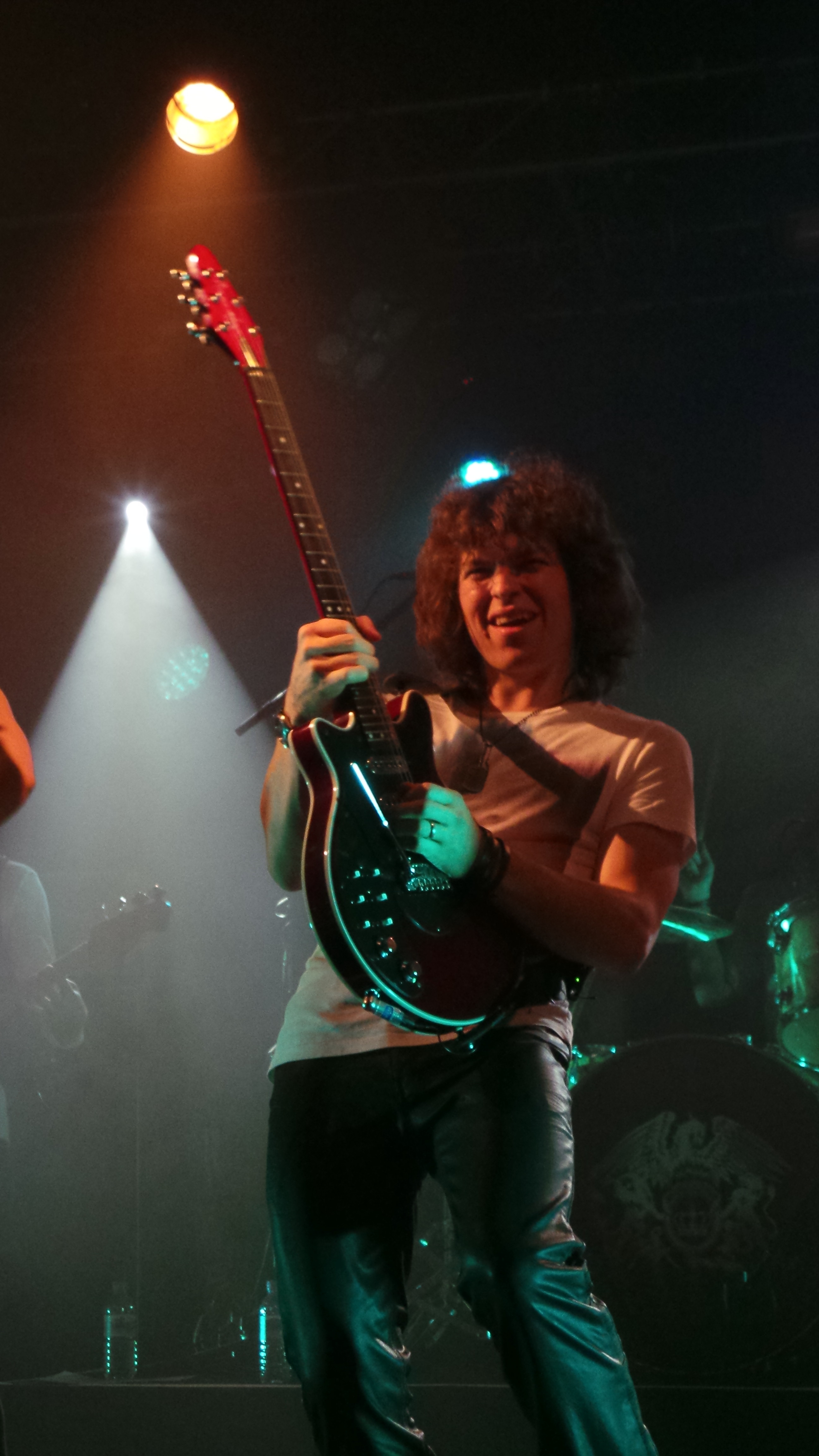
Brian Gresh performing in the Queen Extravaganza Tour at the O2 Academy Oxford in 2013

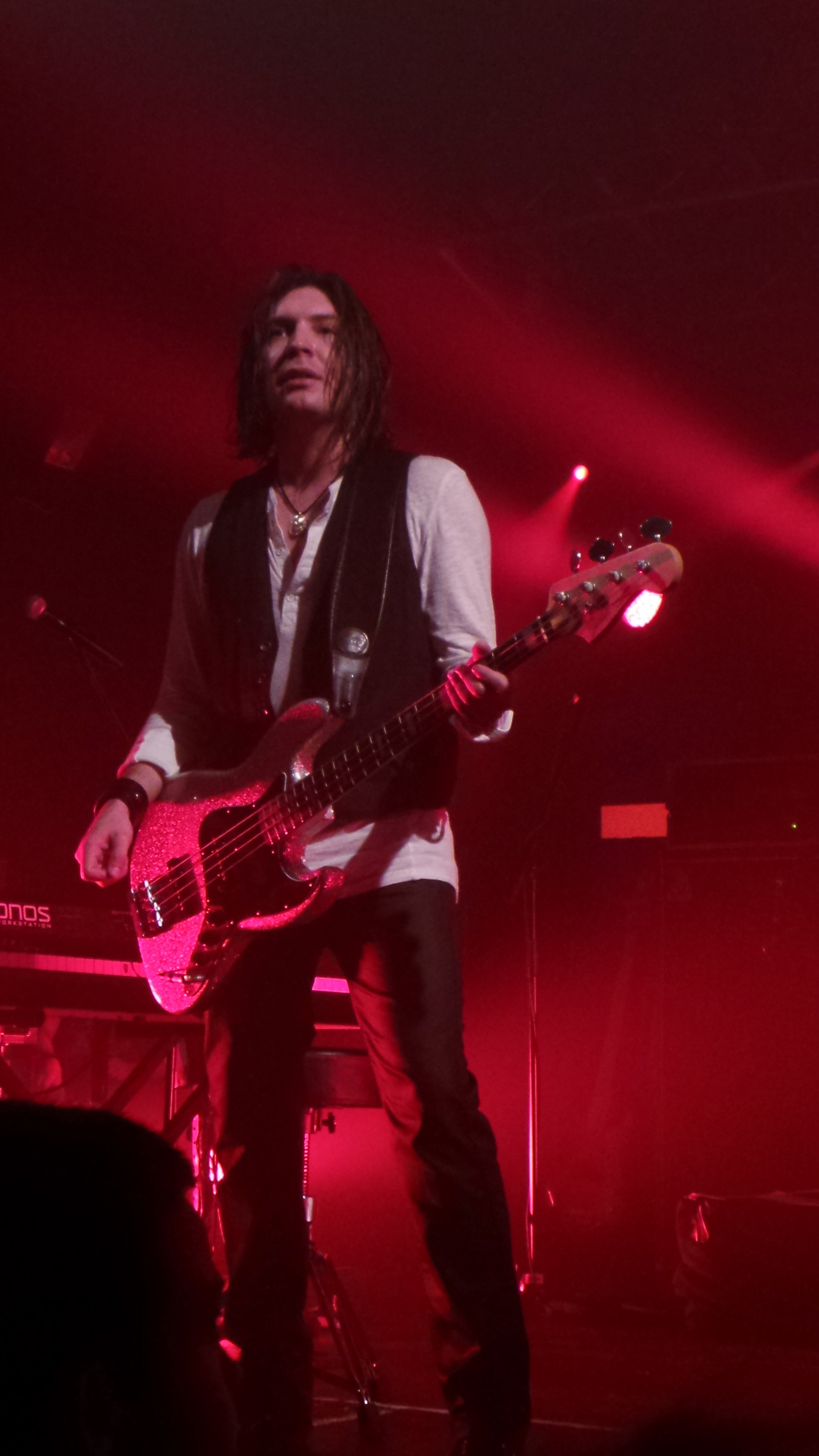
François-Olivier Doyon performing in the Queen Extravaganza Tour at the O2 Academy Oxford in 2013

List of 2012 North American concerts
| Date | City | Country | Venue |
|---|---|---|---|
| 26 May 2012 | Quebec City | Canada | Grand Théâtre de Québec |
| 27 May 2012 | Montreal | Canada | Théâtre Saint-Denis |
| 29 May 2012 | Toronto | Canada | Queen Elizabeth Theatre |
| 31 May 2012 | Detroit | United States | Fox Theatre |
| 1 June 2012 | Chicago | United States | House of Blues |
| 2 June 2012 | Minneapolis | United States | The Brick |
| 4 June 2012 | Cleveland | United States | House of Blues |
| 5 June 2012 | St. Louis | United States | The Pageant |
| 7 June 2012 | Philadelphia | United States | The Pageant |
| 8 June 2012 | Washington, D.C. | United States | 9:30 Club |
| 9 June 2012 | Wallingford | United States | Toyota Oakdale Theatre |
| 10 June 2012 | Bethlehem | United States | Sands Bethlehem Event Center |
| 11 June 2012 | Boston | United States | House of Blues |
| 12 June 2012 | Huntington | United States | The Paramount |
| 15 June 2012 | Tampa | United States | Ferguson Hall |
| 16 June 2012 | Hollywood | United States | Hard Rock Live |
| 17 June 2012 | Orlando | United States | The Plaza Live |
| 19 June 2012 | Grand Prairie | United States | Verizon Theater at Grand Prairie |
| 20 June 2012 | Houston | United States | House of Blues |
| 23 June 2012 | Las Vegas | United States | House of Blues |
| 24 June 2012 | San Diego | United States | Humphreys Concerts by the Bay |
| 25 June 2012 | Los Angeles | United States | Club Nokia |
| 26 June 2012 | San Francisco | United States | Regency Ballroom |
| 28 June 2012 | Seattle | United States | Showbox SoDo |
| 30 June 2012 | Vancouver | Canada | The Orpheum |
| 2 July 2012 | Calgary | Canada | Jack Singer Concert Hall |
| 3 July 2012 | Edmonton | Canada | Northern Alberta Jubilee Auditorium |

List of 2013 North American concerts
| Date | City | Country | Venue |
|---|---|---|---|
| 11 January 2013 | Tarrytown | United States | Tarrytown Music Hall |
| 12 January 2013 | Wallingford | United States | Toyota Oakdale Theatre |
| 13 January 2013 | Huntington | United States | The Paramount |
| 15 January 2013 | Englewood | United States | Bergen Performing Arts Center |
| 16 January 2013 | Hershey | United States | Hershey Theatre |
| 17 January 2013 | Verona | United States | Turning Stone Resort Casino |
| 18 January 2013 | Hamilton | Canada | Hamilton Place Theatre |
| 20 January 2013 | Ottawa | Canada | National Arts Centre |
| 21 January 2013 | Toronto | Canada | Sony Centre for the Performing Arts |
| 22 January 2013 | Quebec City | Canada | Capitole de Québec |
| 23 January 2013 | Quebec City | Canada | Capitole de Québec |
| 25 January 2013 | Quebec City | Canada | Capitole de Québec |
| 26 January 2013 | Quebec City | Canada | Capitole de Québec |
| 27 January 2013 | Quebec City | Canada | Capitole de Québec |
| 29 January 2013 | Sherbrooke | Canada | Granada Theatre |
| 30 January 2013 | Montreal | Canada | Bell Centre |
| 1 February 2013 | Saint John | Canada | Imperial Theatre |
| 2 February 2013 | Moncton | Canada | Casino New Brunswick |
| 3 February 2013 | Halifax | Canada | Rebecca Cohn Auditorium |
| 6 August 2013 | Quebec City | Canada | Capitole de Québec |
| 7 August 2013 | Quebec City | Canada | Capitole de Québec |
| 9 August 2013 | Quebec City | Canada | Capitole de Québec |
| 10 August 2013 | Quebec City | Canada | Capitole de Québec |
| 11 August 2013 | Quebec City | Canada | Capitole de Québec |
| 13 August 2013 | Quebec City | Canada | Capitole de Québec |
| 14 August 2013 | Quebec City | Canada | Capitole de Québec |
| 16 August 2013 | Quebec City | Canada | Capitole de Québec |
| 17 August 2013 | Quebec City | Canada | Capitole de Québec |
| 18 August 2013 | Quebec City | Canada | Capitole de Québec |
| 20 August 2013 | Quebec City | Canada | Capitole de Québec |
| 21 August 2013 | Quebec City | Canada | Capitole de Québec |
| 23 August 2013 | Quebec City | Canada | Capitole de Québec |
| 24 August 2013 | Quebec City | Canada | Capitole de Québec |
| 25 August 2013 | Quebec City | Canada | Capitole de Québec |
| 27 August 2013 | Quebec City | Canada | Capitole de Québec |
| 28 August 2013 | Quebec City | Canada | Capitole de Québec |
| 30 August 2013 | Quebec City | Canada | Capitole de Québec |
| 31 August 2013 | Quebec City | Canada | Capitole de Québec |
| 1 September 2013 | Quebec City | Canada | Capitole de Québec |
| 3 September 2013 | Ottawa | Canada | Scotiabank Place |
| 5 September 2013 | Halifax | Canada | Rebecca Cohn Auditorium |
| 6 September 2013 | Moncton | Canada | Casino New Brunswick |
| 8 September 2013 | Lebanon | United States | Lebanon Opera House |
| 9 September 2013 | Red Bank | United States | Count Basie Theatre |
| 10 September 2013 | Niagara Falls | United States | The Rapids Theatre |
| 11 September 2013 | Morristown | United States | Mayo Performing Arts Center |
| 13 September 2013 | Bethlehem | United States | Sands Bethlehem Event Center |
| 14 September 2013 | Westbury | United States | NYCB Theatre at Westbury |
| 15 September 2013 | New Bedford | United States | Zeiterion Performing Arts Center |

| Date | City | Country | Venue |
|---|---|---|---|
Europe
| October 25, 2013 | Southampton | England | The Brook |
| October 27, 2013 | Birmingham | England | O_{2} Academy Birmingham_{2} |
| October 28, 2013 | Oxford | England | O_{2} Academy Oxford_{2} |
| October 29, 2013 | Bournemouth | England | O_{2} Academy Bournemouth_{2} |
| October 30, 2013 | Liverpool | England | O_{2} Academy Liverpool_{2} |
| November 1, 2013 | Sheffield | England | O_{2} Academy Sheffield_{2} |
| November 2, 2013 | Leicester | England | O_{2} Academy Leicester_{2} |
| November 3, 2013 | Newcastle | England | O_{2} Academy Newcastle_{2} |
| November 4, 2013 | Glasgow | Scotland | O_{2} ABC Glasgow_{2} |
| November 6, 2013 | London | England | O_{2} Shepherd's Bush Empire |
| November 7, 2013 | Reading | England | Sub 89 |
| November 8, 2013 | Worthing | England | Assembly Hall |
| November 10, 2013 | Bath | England | Komedia |
| November 11, 2013 | Manchester | England | Gorilla |
| November 12, 2013 | Bristol | England | Fleece & Firkin |
| May 10, 2014 | Bournemouth | England | O_{2} Academy Bournemouth |
| May 12, 2014 | Antwerp | Belgium | Stadsschouwburg |
| May 13, 2014 | Tilburg | Netherlands | 013 |
| May 15, 2014 | Cologne | Germany | Live Music Hall |
| May 16, 2014 | Hamburg | Germany | Gruenspan |
| May 18, 2014 | Munich | Germany | Alte Kongresshalle |
| May 19, 2014 | Frankfurt | Germany | Batschkapp |
| May 20, 2014 | Berlin | Germany | Fritzclub |
| May 21, 2014 | Vienna | Austria | Wien Arena |
| May 22, 2014 | Padua | Italy | Gran Teatro Geox |
| May 24, 2014 | Paris | France | L'Olympia |
| May 26, 2014 | Copenhagen | Denmark | Koncerthuset |
| May 28, 2014 | Oslo | Norway | Sentrum |
| May 29, 2014 | Stockholm | Sweden | Tyrol |
| May 31, 2014 | Helsinki | Finland | Circus Helsinki |
| September 5, 2014 | Reading | England | The Hexagon |
| September 6, 2014 | Leamington Spa | England | The Assembly |
| September 8, 2014 | Cardiff | Wales | St David's Hall |
| September 9, 2014 | Tunbridge Wells | England | Assembly Hall Theatre |
| September 11, 2014 | Bristol | England | O_{2} Academy Bristol |
| September 12, 2014 | Nottingham | England | Rock City |
| September 13, 2014 | London | England | O_{2} Shepherd's Bush Empire |
| September 15, 2014 | Cambridge | England | Cambridge Corn Exchange |
| September 16, 2014 | Leeds | England | O_{2} Academy Leeds |
| September 18, 2014 | Glasgow | Scotland | O_{2} ABC Glasgow |
| September 19, 2014 | Newcastle | England | Newcastle City Hall |
| September 20, 2014 | Salisbury | England | Salisbury City Hall |
| September 22, 2014 | Cheltenham | England | Cheltenham Town Hall |
| September 23, 2014 | Worthing | England | Pavilion Theatre |
Australia
| October 3, 2015 | Gold Coast | Australia | Jupiters Theatre |
| October 6, 2015 | Sydney | Australia | The Star Event Centre |
| October 10, 2015 | Melbourne | Australia | Palais Theatre |
| October 13, 2015 | Perth | Australia | Crown Theatre |
Europe
| October 30, 2015 | Leamington Spa | England | Assembly |
| October 31, 2015 | Bath | England | The Forum |
| November 1, 2015 | Portsmouth | England | Guildhall |
| November 20, 2015 | Worthing | England | Assembly Hall |
| November 5, 2015 | Watford | England | Colosseum |
| November 6, 2015 | Newcastle | England | City Hall |
| November 8, 2015 | Croydon | England | Fairfield Halls |
| November 9, 2015 | Guildford | England | GLive |
| November 10, 2015 | Edinburgh | Scotland | Usher Hall |
| November 12, 2015 | Cambridge | England | Corn Exchange |
| November 13, 2015 | Lincoln | England | The Engine Shed |
| November 14, 2015 | Norwich | England | Open |
| November 16, 2015 | Birmingham | England | Town Hall |
| November 18, 2015 | Reading | England | The Hexagon |
| November 19, 2015 | Cardiff | Wales | St David's Hall |
| November 20, 2015 | Salisbury | England | City Hall |
| November 21, 2015 | Gloucester | England | GL1 |
| September 4, 2016 | Montreux | Switzerland | Casino Barriere Montreux |
| October 28, 2016 | Plymouth | England | Pavilions |
| October 29, 2016 | Salisbury | England | City Hall |
| October 31, 2016 | Reading | England | The Hexagon |
| November 1, 2016 | Cambridge | England | Corn Exchange |
| November 2, 2016 | Leicester | England | De Montfort Hall |
| November 4, 2016 | Newcastle | England | City Hall |
| November 5, 2016 | Glasgow | Scotland | Clyde Auditorium |
| November 6, 2016 | Liverpool | England | Liverpool Empire Theatre |
| November 8, 2016 | Manchester | England | O2 Apollo |
| November 9, 2016 | Sheffield | England | Sheffield City Hall |
| November 10, 2016 | York | England | York Barbican |
| November 12, 2016 | Cardiff | Wales | St David's Hall |
| November 13, 2016 | Aylesbury | England | Waterside Theatre |
| November 14, 2016 | Portsmouth | England | Guildhall |
| November 16, 2016 | Stoke-on-Trent | England | Victoria Hall |
| November 18, 2016 | Llandudno | Wales | Venue Cymru |
| November 19, 2016 | Birmingham | England | Symphony Hall |
| November 20, 2016 | London | England | Hammersmith Apollo |

Festivals and other miscellaneous performances
^{A} Two performances

=== Box office score data ===
| Venue | City | Tickets sold / available | Gross revenue |
|---|---|---|---|
| Grand Théâtre de Québec | Québec City | 1,671 / 1,671 (100%) | $84,163 |
| Théâtre Saint-Denis | Montreal | 2,077 / 2,077 (100%) | $89,692 |
| The Brick | Minneapolis | 441 / 1,077 (41%) | $13,440 |
| 9:30 Club | Washington, D.C. | 907 / 1,200 (76%) | $31,745 |
| Ferguson Hall | Tampa | 810 / 1,042 (78%) | $34,051 |
| Plaza Live | Orlando | 787 / 837 (94%) | $26,907 |
| Club NOKIA | Los Angeles | 1,010 / 2,400 (42%) | $32,448 |
| Regency Center Grand Ballroom | San Francisco | 481 / 1,424 (34%) | $16,256 |
| Orpheum Theatre | Vancouver | 2,005 / 2,600 (77%) | $54,650 |
| Jack Singer Theatre | Calgary | 1,493 / 1,710 (87%) | $46,714 |
| Northern Jubilee Auditorium | Edmonton | 1,860 / 2,605 (71%) | $53,303 |
| Theatre Granada | Sherbrooke | 776 / 776 (100%) | $30,402 |
| Bell Centre | Montreal | 3,337 / 3,550 (94%) | $190,664 |
| Imperial Theatre | St. John's | 667 / 700 (95%) | $26,310 |
| Casino New Brunswick | Moncton | 1,705 / 1,790 (95%) | $72,590 |
| Rebecca Cohn Auditorium | Halifax | 922 / 1,035 (89%) | $37,923 |
| TOTAL | | 20,949 / 26,494 (79%) | $841,258 |

== Tour band ==
Current members

- Alirio Netto — lead vocals
- Nick Radcliffe — lead guitar, backing vocals
- Brian Gresh — lead guitar, backing vocals (2012-2013 & 2018 North American Tour)
- Tyler Warren — drums, percussions, backing vocals
- François-Olivier Doyon — bass guitar, backing vocals
- Darren Reeves — keyboards, backing vocals
- Alex Maynard — keyboards, backing vocals

Former members

- Tristan Avakian — lead guitar, rhythm guitar, backing vocals (2012 tour only)
- Yvan Pedneault — vocals, backing vocals (2012 tour only)
- Jeff Scott Soto — vocals, backing vocals (2012 tour only)
- Jennifer Espinoza — vocals
- Brandon Ethridge — keyboards, piano, backing vocals
- Marc Martel — lead vocals, piano, rhythm guitar (not touring during 2018)
