= Deep Cuts =

Deep Cuts may refer to:

- Deep Cuts (Mr. Big album)
- Deep Cuts (The Knife album)
- Deep Cuts (Strawbs album)
- Deep Cuts (A Perfect Circle album)
- Deep Cuts (Yellowcard album)
- Deep Cuts, Volume 1 (1973–1976) (Queen album)
- Deep Cuts, Volume 2 (1977–1982) (Queen album)
- Deep Cuts, Volume 3 (1984–1995) (Queen album)
- Deep Cuts (The Choir album)
- Deep Cuts (2025), a novel by Holly Brickley

== See also ==
- Deep Cut, 2008 play by Philip Ralph
- "Deep Cuts", a season 4 episode of The Loud House
- Deepcut (disambiguation)
