= Deep Cuts, Volume 1 (1973–1976) =

Compilation album by Queen
- Released: 14 March 2011
- Recorded: 1972–1976
- Genre: Rock
- Length: 50:07
- Label: Island
- Producer: Queen; Roy Thomas Baker

Queen chronology
The Singles Collection Volume 4 (2010)	Deep Cuts, Volume 1 (1973–1976) (2011)	Deep Cuts, Volume 2 (1977–1982) (2011)

Professional ratings
Review scores
Source	Rating
AllMusic	4/5 stars
Sputnikmusic	3.8/5 stars

Deep Cuts, Volume 1 (1973–1976) is a compilation of Queen tracks between 1973 and 1976. Unlike other compilations released by Queen, Deep Cuts contains songs which are largely not as well known as Queen's hits. The album was released on 14 March 2011 as part of Queen's 40th anniversary. Deep Cuts Volume 1 was released at the same time Queen's first five albums (Queen, Queen II, Sheer Heart Attack, A Night at the Opera, and A Day at the Races) were re-released. The songs picked were all personal favourite songs, that were not hits, selected by Brian May, Roger Taylor, and Taylor Hawkins (the drummer for the Foo Fighters). It is the only release to feature the complete ending of "The March of The Black Queen" (on Queen II it segues to "Funny How Love Is") and of "Ogre Battle" (on Queen II it segues to "The Fairy Feller's Master-Stroke"). The three songs "Tenement Funster", "Flick of the Wrist" and "Lily of the Valley" all segue into each other just as on the original Sheer Heart Attack album.

== Track listing ==
No.	Title	Writer(s)	Original Album	Length
1.	"Ogre Battle"	Freddie Mercury	Queen II, 1974	4:14
2.	"Stone Cold Crazy"	Queen	Sheer Heart Attack, 1974	2:13
3.	"My Fairy King"	Mercury	Queen, 1973	4:08
4.	"I'm in Love with My Car"	Roger Taylor	A Night at the Opera, 1975	3:05
5.	"Keep Yourself Alive"	Brian May	Queen	3:46
6.	"Long Away"	May	A Day at the Races, 1976	3:33
7.	"The Millionaire Waltz"	Mercury	A Day at the Races	4:54
8.	"'39"	May	A Night at the Opera	3:30
9.	"Tenement Funster"	Taylor	Sheer Heart Attack	2:46
10.	"Flick of the Wrist"	Mercury	Sheer Heart Attack	3:17
11.	"Lily of the Valley"	Mercury	Sheer Heart Attack	1:45
12.	"Good Company"	May	A Night at the Opera	3:23
13.	"The March of the Black Queen"	Mercury	Queen II	6:38
14.	"In the Lap of the Gods... Revisited"	Mercury	Sheer Heart Attack	3:46
Total length:				50:58

== Personnel ==
- Freddie Mercury: lead and backing vocals, piano
- Brian May: guitars, lead vocals on "39", "Long Away" and "Good Company", vocal bridge on "Keep Yourself Alive", backing vocals, ukulele, bells
- Roger Taylor: drums, percussion, lead vocals on "Tenement Funster" and "I'm in Love with My Car", vocal line in "The March of the Black Queen", vocal bridge on "Keep Yourself Alive"
- John Deacon: bass guitar, acoustic guitar

== Charts ==
Chart (2011)	Peak position
Spanish Albums (Promusicae)	90
UK Charts (Official Charts Company)	92
