= Roy Ziv =

Canadian guitarist

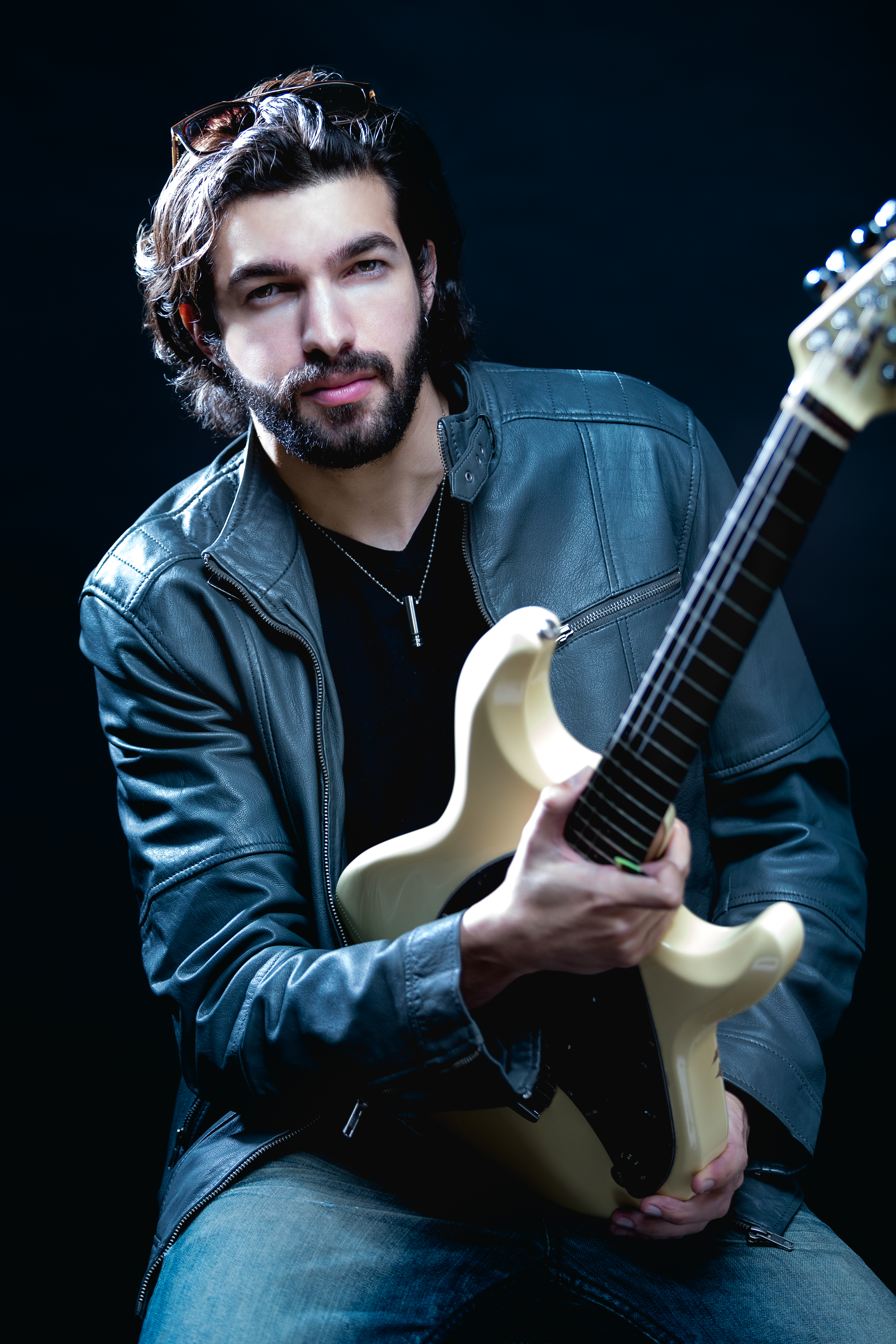

Background information
- Born: Roy Ziv; August 20, 1991 (age 35)
- Origin: Israel
- Genres: Progressive Rock, pop, Latin
- Occupations: Guitarist, musician, YouTuber
- Instruments: Guitar, piano, keyboard, bass guitar
- Years active: 2011–present
- Website: royzivmusic.com

YouTube information
- Channel: RoyZivMusic
- Genre: Music
- Subscribers: 586 thousand
- Views: 164.1 million
- Last updated: 09 January 2026

Roy Ziv (born August 20, 1991), is a Canadian guitarist, YouTuber, and producer. Known for his videos performing guitar solos over pop songs and his work with Queen Extravaganza, Ziv released his first EP Distant Visions in September 2020.

== Early life ==
Born in 1991 in Israel, Ziv began playing music at a young age before moving to Canada in 1999. After finishing high school in 2009 Ziv traveled to Ramat Hasharon where he was enrolled in Rimon School of Music, and in 2010 was accepted into Berklee College of Music.

== Career ==
In 2011 Ziv was selected as a finalist in the Queen Extravanganza competition formed by Roger Taylor in honor of the band's 40th anniversary. In 2017 Ziv joined JTC Guitar as a masterclass instructor and shortly after began work with Positive Grid showcasing their Spark amplifier. In October 2020 Ziv hosted the Global Connections: Audience Building and Entrepreneurship webinar for Berklee.

== Musical style ==
Although musically diverse, Ziv is often compared to virtuoso guitarists Joe Satriani and Steve Vai for his soundscapes and shredding. In addition to guitar (most notably his 2005 Music Man Silhouette Special), Ziv is also a proficient pianist.

== Discography ==
Albums

- Distant Visions EP (2020)

Singles

- Currents (2020)
- Showtime (2018)
- Defying Gravity (2017)
- Leap Of Faith (2016)

=== As featured artist ===
Song	Year	Artist	Album
"Mega Collab!"	2019	Various	Mega Collab!
"The Great Indian Melodic Guitar Jam 2"	2019	Utsav Manga	The Great Indian Melodic Guitar Jam 2
"Defying Gravity"	2017	Various	JTC Guitar Hero Ballads 2

=== As writer ===
Song	Year	Artist	Album
"All About"	2016	Shaun Frank & VanRip	Single
