= Deepcut (disambiguation) =

Deepcut is a military village in England.

Deepcut or Deep Cut may also refer to:

- Deepcut Barracks, the Princess Royal Barracks, Deepcut
- Deep Cut (band), a British rock band
- Deep Cut (play), 2008 play by Philip Ralph
- Operation Deep Cut, a raid by British Commandos during the Second World War
- Shiver, Frye and Big Man, a fictional trio also known as Deep Cut in the video game series Splatoon

== See also ==
- Deep Cuts (disambiguation)
