= Lily of the Valley (song) =

Song by Queen

from the album Sheer Heart Attack
- A-side: "Now I'm Here"
- Published: Queen Music Ltd.
- Released: 8 November 1974
- Recorded: July 1974
- Studio: Trident, London
- Length: 1:44
- Label: EMI; Elektra
- Songwriter: Freddie Mercury
- Producers: Roy Thomas Baker; Queen

"Lily of the Valley" is a song by British rock band Queen. It was written by lead singer Freddie Mercury, who also plays the piano and provides all the vocals on the track. It was originally featured on Queen's third album, Sheer Heart Attack, released in 1974, and is one of the album's few ballads.

In 1975, "Lily of the Valley" was released as the B-side of different singles in the U.K. and the United States. The U.K. single was "Now I'm Here", and the U.S. single was a reissue of "Keep Yourself Alive". For the former release the first measure of the song was excised to avoid the cross-fade with "Flick of the Wrist", the preceding song on the parent album. On the latter release the first measure is present but the cross-fade is absent, making this version a true stand-alone mix. Further, on the U.S. single only, the song's end abuts the start of a stand-alone mix of 'God Save The Queen' from A Night At The Opera (that is, the album's cross-fade from "Bohemian Rhapsody" to "God Save The Queen" is absent).

The lyrics refer back to a song from a previous album, "Seven Seas of Rhye" from Queen II, with the line "messenger from Seven Seas has flown, to tell the King of Rhye he's lost his throne."

In a 1999 interview, Brian May told the British music magazine Mojo, "Freddie's stuff was so heavily cloaked, lyrically... But you could find out, just from little insights, that a lot of his private thoughts were in there, although a lot of the more meaningful stuff was not very accessible. Lily of the Valley was utterly heartfelt. It's about looking at his girlfriend and realising that his body needed to be somewhere else. It's a great piece of art, but it's the last song that would ever be a hit."

== Covers ==
"Lily of the Valley" was covered by 1980s band Game Theory, whose frontman Scott Miller performed a version that appears as a bonus track on the 2015 Omnivore reissue of Game Theory's 1985 album Real Nighttime, produced by Mitch Easter.

The song was also covered, together with "Tenement Funster" and "Flick of the Wrist", by Dream Theater on the bonus disc of their album Black Clouds & Silver Linings.

== Other album appearances ==
The song also appears on two Queen compilation albums: Deep Cuts, Volume 1 (1973–1976) (2011) and Queen Forever (2014).

== Personnel ==
Queen

- Freddie Mercury – lead and backing vocals, piano
- Brian May – guitars
- Roger Taylor – drums
- John Deacon – bass guitar
