= Deep Cuts, Volume 3 (1984–1995) =

Compilation album by Queen
- Released: 5 September 2011
- Recorded: 1983–1995
- Genre: Rock
- Length: 57:01
- Label: Island
- Producer: Various

Queen chronology
Deep Cuts, Volume 2 (1977–1982) (2011)	Deep Cuts, Volume 3 (1984–1995) (2011)	Hungarian Rhapsody: Queen Live in Budapest (2012)

Deep Cuts, Volume 3 (1984–1995) is a compilation of Queen featuring some of their lesser-known tracks from between 1984 and 1995. Deep Cuts Volume 3 was released on 5 September 2011, as part of Queen's 40th Anniversary, simultaneously with the third group of five reissues of Queen studio albums (The Works, A Kind of Magic, The Miracle, Innuendo and Made in Heaven) from which the songs are sampled. In this release, "Khashoggi's Ship" has a drum intro (to separate it from the song "Party", which was not included in this compilation) and "It's a Beautiful Day (Reprise)" starts with 15 seconds of slow build-up and ends with "Yeah" (which is a separate track on Made in Heaven). The release date of the album would have also been former lead singer Freddie Mercury's 65th birthday.

== Track listing ==
No.	Title	Writer(s)	Original Album	Length
1.	"Made in Heaven"	Freddie Mercury	Made in Heaven, 1995	5:27
2.	"Machines (or 'Back to Humans')"	Brian May, Roger Taylor	The Works, 1984	5:07
3.	"Don't Try So Hard"	Queen (Mercury)	Innuendo, 1991	3:40
4.	"Tear It Up"	May	The Works	3:24
5.	"I Was Born to Love You"	Mercury	Made in Heaven	4:50
6.	"A Winter's Tale"	Queen (Mercury)	Made in Heaven	3:52
7.	"Ride the Wild Wind"	Queen (Taylor)	Innuendo	4:43
8.	"Bijou"	Queen (Mercury, May)	Innuendo	3:37
9.	"Was It All Worth It"	Queen (Mercury)	The Miracle, 1989	5:45
10.	"One Year of Love"	John Deacon	A Kind of Magic, 1986	4:27
11.	"Khashoggi's Ship"	Queen (Mercury, May, Deacon, Taylor)	The Miracle	2:52
12.	"Is This the World We Created...?"	Mercury, May	The Works	2:12
13.	"The Hitman"	Queen (Mercury, May, Deacon)	Innuendo	4:56
14.	"It's a Beautiful Day (Reprise)"	Queen (Mercury)	Made in Heaven	3:21
15.	"Mother Love"	Mercury, May	Made in Heaven	4:48
