= Now I'm Here =

1975 single by Queen

- Belgian picture sleeve

Single by Queen

from the album Sheer Heart Attack
- B-side: "Lily of the Valley"
- Released: 17 January 1975 (UK); May 1975 (Japan)
- Recorded: September 1974
- Genre: Hard rock
- Length: 4:12
- Label: EMI (UK); Elektra (Japan)
- Songwriter: Brian May
- Producers: Roy Thomas Baker; Queen

Queen singles chronology
"Killer Queen" / "Flick of the Wrist" (1974)	"Now I'm Here" (1975)	"Bohemian Rhapsody" (1975)

Music video
- "Now I'm Here" on YouTube

"Now I'm Here" is a song by British rock band Queen, released on their third studio album, Sheer Heart Attack (1974). Written by guitarist Brian May, it is noted for its gritty guitar riffs and vocal harmonies. It reached No. 11 on the UK Singles Chart when released there as a single in 1975. The song was a live favourite, performed at virtually every Queen concert from late 1974 to the end of their touring career in 1986.

== Details ==
"Now I'm Here" draws on May's fond experiences of the band's US tour earlier in 1974. Mott the Hoople, whom Queen were supporting, are referenced in the line "Down in the city, just Hoople and me".

The song also appeared on the 1981 compilation album Greatest Hits and the 1997 compilation album Queen Rocks. In March 2005, Q magazine placed "Now I'm Here" at number 33 in its list of the 100 Greatest Guitar Tracks.

== Live performances ==
"Now I'm Here" was a fixture of Queen's setlists, being performed on every concert tour from 1974 until the band's final tour in 1986. It was first performed on the Sheer Heart Attack Tour in Manchester on 30 October 1974.

On the Sheer Heart Attack Tour, Mercury would be seen singing the line "Now I'm here" on one side of the stage amidst the darkness and dry ice, and a few bars later, at "Now I'm there", he would "appear" on the other side of the stage, an illusion created by an identically dressed stagehand.

The liner notes of Live Killers (1979), Queen's first live album, state that the song was dropped from the setlist for some time, but had recently been reintroduced. The song was rearranged to allow Mercury to interact with the audience in a "call and response" sing along. It is unclear when the song was dropped and for how long.

May continued to perform the song as a solo artist following Mercury's death in 1991. At The Freddie Mercury Tribute Concert in 1992, May joined Def Leppard on stage to perform the song, which went on to become the B-side to Def Leppard's single "Tonight" and would also make it onto the deluxe edition of their Adrenalize album. It was used as the opening song on the American, Asian and Australian legs of the Queen + Adam Lambert Tour 2014–2015.

== Charts ==
Chart (1975)	Peak position
Belgium (Ultratop 50 Wallonia)	29
Netherlands (Dutch Top 40)	32
Netherlands (Single Top 100)	29
UK Singles (Official Charts)	11
West Germany (GfK)	25

== Certifications ==
Region	Certification	Certified units/sales
United Kingdom (BPI)	Silver	200,000^{‡}
^{‡} Sales+streaming figures based on certification alone.

== Personnel ==
=== Queen ===
- Freddie Mercury – lead and backing vocals, Hammond organ
- Brian May – guitars, piano, backing vocals
- Roger Taylor – drums, backing vocals, percussion
- John Deacon – bass guitar

== Live recordings ==
- Live Killers (1979)
- Concerts for the People of Kampuchea (recorded at Queen's Christmas concert at the Hammersmith Odeon, London; 1979)
- Queen Rock Montreal (1981)
- Queen on Fire – Live at the Bowl (1982)
- Live at Wembley '86 / Live at Wembley Stadium (1986)
- Hungarian Rhapsody: Queen Live in Budapest (1987)
- The Freddie Mercury Tribute Concert (played by Def Leppard and Brian May; 1992)
- Live at the Brixton Academy (Brian May album; 1993)
- Live at the Rainbow '74 (2014)
- A Night at the Odeon – Hammersmith 1975 (2015)
