= Deep Cuts, Volume 2 (1977–1982) =

Compilation album by Queen
- Released: 27 June 2011
- Recorded: 1977–1982
- Genre: Rock
- Length: 52:09
- Label: Island
- Producer: Various

Queen chronology
Deep Cuts, Volume 1 (1973–1976) (2011)	Deep Cuts, Volume 2 (1977–1982) (2011)	Deep Cuts, Volume 3 (1984–1995) (2011)

Deep Cuts, Volume 2 (1977–1982) is a compilation of Queen tracks between 1977 and 1982. Like its predecessor, Volume 1, it contains Queen songs that are less well known.

== Track listing ==
No.	Title	Writer(s)	Original Album	Length
1.	"Mustapha"	Freddie Mercury	Jazz, 1978	3:01
2.	"Sheer Heart Attack"	Roger Taylor	News of the World, 1977	3:27
3.	"Spread Your Wings"	John Deacon	News of the World	4:34
4.	"Sleeping on the Sidewalk"	Brian May	News of the World	3:07
5.	"It's Late"	May	News of the World	6:27
6.	"Rock It (Prime Jive)"	Taylor	The Game, 1980	4:33
7.	"Dead on Time"	May	Jazz	3:23
8.	"Sail Away Sweet Sister"	May	The Game	3:33
9.	"Dragon Attack"	May	The Game	4:18
10.	"Action This Day"	Taylor	Hot Space, 1982	3:34
11.	"Put Out the Fire"	May	Hot Space	3:18
12.	"Staying Power"	Mercury	Hot Space	4:12
13.	"Jealousy"	Mercury	Jazz	3:13
14.	"Battle Theme"	May	Flash Gordon, 1980	2:20
Total length:				53:00

== Personnel ==
- Freddie Mercury: lead and backing vocals, piano, synthesiser, keyboards, synth bass on "Staying Power"
- Brian May: lead guitar, lead vocals on "Sail Away Sweet Sister" and "Sleeping on the Sidewalk", falsetto vocals on "Put out the Fire", backing vocals, synthesiser, percussion
- Roger Taylor: drums, percussion, lead vocals on "Rock it (Prime Jive), co-lead vocals on "Sheer Heart Attack and "Action This Day", backing vocals, synthesiser, rhythm guitar and bass guitar on "Sheer Heart Attack"
- John Deacon: bass guitar, acoustic guitar, synthesiser, rhythm guitar on "Staying Power"
