= Killer Queen =

1974 single by Queen

- 1988 UK reissue picture sleeve

Single by Queen

from the album Sheer Heart Attack
- A-side: "Flick of the Wrist" (double A-side)
- Released: 11 October 1974
- Recorded: July–August 1974
- Studio: Trident (London, England); Rockfield (Wye Valley, Wales)
- Genre: Glam rock; art pop; power pop; experimental rock; music hall; pop rock; hard rock
- Length: 3:00
- Label: EMI
- Songwriter: Freddie Mercury
- Producers: Roy Thomas Baker; Queen

Queen singles chronology
"Seven Seas of Rhye" (1974)	"Killer Queen" / "Flick of the Wrist" (1974)	"Now I'm Here" (1975)

Music video
- "Killer Queen" on YouTube

"Killer Queen" is a song by the British rock band Queen. It was written by lead singer Freddie Mercury and recorded for their third album Sheer Heart Attack in 1974. It reached number two in the UK singles chart and became their first US hit, reaching number twelve on the Billboard Hot 100. The song is about a high-class call girl and has been characterised as "Mercury's piano-led paean to a Moët-quaffing courtesan".

The song is included in Queen's 1981 Greatest Hits compilation. It is also recorded on the live albums Live Killers and Queen Rock Montreal.

== History and recording ==
Mercury commented he wrote the lyrics before the melody and music, whereas normally he would do the opposite. He stated that the song was about a high-class call girl. The song's first verse quotes a phrase traditionally but falsely attributed to Marie Antoinette: "'Let them eat cake,' she says, Just like Marie Antoinette". "Killer Queen" retained the essence of Queen's trademark sound, particularly in its meticulous vocal harmonies.

Unlike the first two Queen albums, this song was partly recorded at Rockfield Studios in Wales. The recording features elaborate four-part harmonies (particularly in the choruses, and also providing backing parts in the verses), and also a multitracked guitar solo by Brian May which makes use of the bell effect. At one point, there are two distinct bass guitar lines, one of which diverges into a descending run.

== Release ==
When released as a single, "Killer Queen" was Queen's breakthrough hit, reaching number two in the United Kingdom and number twelve in the United States. It was released as a double A-side in the UK, the US, and Canada (where it reached number 15 in the RPM 100 national singles chart), with the song "Flick of the Wrist". Several different versions of "Flick of the Wrist" were used on different releases. In 1986, "Killer Queen" featured as the B-side to "Who Wants to Live Forever".

== Queen on the song ==
Freddie Mercury:

People are used to hard rock, energy music from Queen, yet with this single you almost expect Noël Coward to sing it. It's one of those bowler hat, black suspender belt numbers – not that Coward would wear that. ... It's about a high class call girl. I'm trying to say that classy people can be whores as well. That's what the song is about, though I'd prefer people to put their interpretation upon it – to read into it what they like.

Brian May:

'Killer Queen' was the turning point. It was the song that best summed up our kind of music, and a big hit, and we desperately needed it as a mark of something successful happening for us... I was always very happy with this song. The whole [album] was made in a very craftsman-like manner. I still enjoy listening to it because there's a lot to listen to, but it never gets cluttered. There's always space for all the little ideas to come through. And of course, I like the solo, with that three-part section, where each part has its own voice...It's vintage Queen. The first time I heard Freddie playing that song, I was lying in my room in Rockfield [a residential recording studio in Wales], feeling very sick. After Queen's first American tour, I had hepatitis, and then I had very bad stomach problems and I had to be operated on. So I remember just lying there, hearing Freddie play this really great song and feeling sad, because I thought, 'I can't even get out of bed to participate in this.' But then I got fixed up, thank God. And when I came out again, we were able to finish off 'Killer Queen.' They left some space for me and I did the solo. I had strong feelings about one of the harmony bits in the chorus, so we had another go at that too.

== Live performances ==
The song was regularly performed between 1974 and 1981 as part of a medley. In 1974–1975, the song was played following "In the Lap of the Gods", and in 1975–76, the song followed "Bohemian Rhapsody". In 1984 and 1985, during The Works Tour, it was reintroduced in a medley following a truncated version of "Somebody to Love".

== Critical reception and legacy ==
On the single's release, Cash Box said that it had "fine lead vocals, solid harmonies and an inventive production" and that "this song is bound to make you smile with its lighthearted whimsy and confident approach." Record World described it as "a cross between Bowie and Wings".

Retrospectively, "Killer Queen" was described by AllMusic as the true beginning of Queen's "radio sound" and "recalls the cabaret songs of yesteryear, but also shows how Queen was fast becoming a master of power pop". Rock historian Paul Fowles wrote that "Killer Queen", with its "sleazy Parisian imagery", allowed "free rein" to Mercury's "unique brand of rock theater".

American pop singer Katy Perry cited "Killer Queen" as an important influence on her, saying it "made me discover music and helped me come into my own at the age of 15".

== Personnel ==
- Freddie Mercury – lead and backing vocals, grand piano, tack piano, finger snapping
- Brian May – guitars, backing vocals
- Roger Taylor – drums, backing vocals, triangle, chimes
- John Deacon – bass guitar

== Chart performance ==
=== Weekly charts ===
Chart (1974–1975)	Peak position
Australia (Kent Music Report)	24
Austria (Ö3 Austria Top 40)	10
Belgium (Ultratop 50 Flanders)	7
Belgium (Ultratop 50 Wallonia)	4
Canadian Top Singles (RPM)	15
Finland (Suomen Virallinen)	16
Ireland (IRMA)	2
Netherlands (Dutch Top 40)	3
Netherlands (Single Top 100)	3
Norway (VG-lista)	4
UK Singles (Official Charts)	2
US Billboard Hot 100	12
US Cash Box Top 100	12
West Germany (GfK)	12

Chart (2018)	Peak position
Australia (ARIA)	85
Japan Hot 100 (Billboard)	47
US Hot Rock & Alternative Songs (Billboard)	12

=== Year-end charts ===
Chart (1974)	Position
UK Singles (OCC)	29

Chart (1975)	Position
Belgium (Ultratop Flanders)	84
Canada Top Singles (RPM)	132
Netherlands (Dutch Top 40)	37
Netherlands (Single Top 100)	46
US Billboard Hot 100	78

Chart (2019)	Position
US Hot Rock Songs (Billboard)	37

== Sales and certifications ==
Region	Certification	Certified units/sales
Denmark (IFPI Danmark)	Platinum	90,000^{‡}
Germany (BVMI)	Gold	300,000^{‡}
Italy (FIMI)	Platinum	100,000^{‡}
New Zealand (RMNZ)	2× Platinum	60,000^{‡}
Portugal (AFP)	Gold	20,000^{‡}
Spain (Promusicae)	Platinum	60,000^{‡}
United Kingdom (BPI)	2× Platinum	1,200,000^{‡}
United States (RIAA)	4× Platinum	4,000,000^{‡}
^{‡} Sales+streaming figures based on certification alone.

== 5 Seconds of Summer version ==
"Killer Queen"

Single by 5 Seconds of Summer
- Released: 25 October 2018
- Length: 3:18
- Label: Virgin EMI
- Songwriter: Freddie Mercury

5 Seconds of Summer singles chronology
"Valentine" (2018)	"Killer Queen" (2018)	"Lie to Me" (2018)

Audio video
- "Killer Queen" on YouTube

In October 2018, Australian band 5 Seconds of Summer released a version of the song ahead of release of Queen's biopic, Bohemian Rhapsody. The cover was released to support the Mercury Phoenix Trust, an organization founded by Queen's band members that aims to provide support in the fight against HIV/AIDS.

The song was released to coincide with the release of the film Bohemian Rhapsody. Universal Music Group released 3 tracks by different artists' channeling their inner Freddie Mercury; this is the second installment, following Shawn Mendes' "Under Pressure" released two weeks earlier.

According to 5 Seconds of Summer, Queen's "unique harmonies, the fluidity to their songwriting and how they each used their own musicality to back each other up have always inspired us. For us, the exploration of individual vocalists in a band is incredibly important and Queen helped us to see the future of how we want to sing, in addition to how we play our instruments." A portion of the profits from the "Killer Queen" cover will be donated to Mercury Phoenix Trust, which was founded by Queen's Brian May and Roger Taylor (and the group's manager, Jim Beach) after Mercury's death to help fight AIDS worldwide.

=== Reception ===
Brooke Bajgrowicz from Billboard said "The four-piece pop rock band launch into the anthemic a cappella chorus from the get-go... By the time the full-force chorus arrives, the fluid harmonies and catchy phrasing are instantly recognizable. While somewhat modernised, the single fades out in a style similar to the original Queen banger, and other '70s hits of the time". Daniel Kreps from Rolling Stone called the version "Faithful".

=== Charts ===
Chart (2018)	Peak position
Mexico Ingles Airplay (Billboard)	49
New Zealand Hot Singles (RMNZ)	18
