= Seven Seas of Rhye =

1974 song by Queen

Instrumental by Queen

from the album Queen
- Released: 13 July 1973
- Recorded: April – 30 July 1972
- Studio: Trident, London
- Length: 1:15
- Label: EMI (UK); Elektra (US)
- Songwriter: Freddie Mercury
- Producers: John Anthony; Roy Thomas Baker; Queen

"Seven Seas of Rhye"
- 1988 UK reissue picture sleeve

Single by Queen

from the album Queen II
- B-side: "See What a Fool I've Been" (UK); "The Loser in the End" (Japan)
- Released: 22 February 1974 (UK); 20 June 1974 (US)
- Recorded: August 1973 – February 1974
- Studio: Trident, London
- Genre: Hard rock; glam rock; progressive rock
- Length: 2:47
- Label: EMI (UK); Elektra (US)
- Songwriter: Freddie Mercury
- Producers: Roy Thomas Baker; Queen

Queen singles chronology
"Liar" (1974)	"Seven Seas of Rhye" (1974)	"Killer Queen" / "Flick of the Wrist" (1974)

Music video
- "Seven Seas of Rhye" on YouTube

"Seven Seas of Rhye" is a song by the British rock band Queen. It was written by Freddie Mercury along with Brian May who contributed the second middle-eight. A rudimentary instrumental version appears as the final track on the group's self-titled debut album (1973), with the final version on the follow-up Queen II (1974).

The completed version served as the band's third single, and after performing the song on the BBC's Top of the Pops in February 1974 it became their first hit, reaching number 10 on the UK Singles Chart. It is the earliest-released song to appear on their Greatest Hits album, with the exception of some versions where their first single, "Keep Yourself Alive", is included. "Seven Seas of Rhye" is inspired by the fantasy world of Freddie Mercury and his sister, Kashmira Bulsara when they were children.

== Background ==
Initially "Seven Seas of Rhye" was simply an "instrumental musical sketch closing their first album". An expanded rendition, planned to be included on the album Queen II, was publicly premiered when Queen was offered a sudden chance to appear on the BBC's Top of the Pops in February 1974, and was rushed to vinyl two days later on 22 February. It became their first chart entry after gaining airtime on BBC Radio 1, peaking at number 10 on the UK Singles Chart, which in turn persuaded Freddie Mercury to take up Queen as his full-time career.

== Style, construction and interpretation ==
"Seven Seas of Rhye" is a hard rock, glam rock and progressive rock song, featuring a distinctive arpeggiated piano introduction. (Note: These piano runs were later sampled in "It's a Beautiful Day (reprise)", on the album Made in Heaven.)

The version on Queen II ends with a cross fade, instruments blending into the band singing "I Do Like to Be Beside the Seaside", accompanied by a stylophone played by Roy Thomas Baker, which was a sole exception to their "no synths" statement. Its inclusion here on the final track of Queen II is briefly mirrored via whistling during the first few seconds of "Brighton Rock", which opens their next album, Sheer Heart Attack.

In a 1977 radio interview, Mercury described the subject of the song as a "figment of his imagination". In the Queen musical We Will Rock You, the Seven Seas of Rhye is a place where the Bohemians are taken after they are brain-drained by Khashoggi.

== Reception ==
Cash Box called it a "high energy rocker with Led Zeppelin overtones," stating that "the group's extraordinary talents are perfectly displayed here in heavy metal fashion." Record World said that Queen's "'rock in the royal tradition' is looking for its own top 40 chart crown."

== Live performances ==
The song was dropped from the live set in 1976 and was not played in concert again until The Works Tour eight years later.

== Personnel ==
Instrumental Version

- Freddie Mercury – piano
- Brian May – guitars
- Roger Taylor – drums, percussion
- John Deacon – bass guitar

Vocal version

Queen

- Freddie Mercury – lead and backing vocals, piano
- Brian May – guitars, backing vocals
- Roger Taylor – drums, tambourine, backing vocals
- John Deacon – bass guitar

Guest musician

- Roy Thomas Baker – stylophone

== Certifications ==
Region	Certification	Certified units/sales
United Kingdom (BPI)	Silver	200,000^{‡}
^{‡} Sales+streaming figures based on certification alone.
