= Sheer Heart Attack =

Studio album by Queen
- Released: 8 November 1974
- Recorded: 7 July – 22 October 1974
- Studios: Trident, London; Rockfield, Monmouthshire; AIR, London; Wessex Sound, Highbury New Park
- Genres: Hard rock; glam rock
- Length: 38:41
- Labels: EMI; Elektra
- Producers: Roy Thomas Baker; Queen

Queen chronology
Queen II (1974)	Sheer Heart Attack (1974)	A Night at the Opera (1975)

Singles from Sheer Heart Attack
- 1. "Killer Queen" / "Flick of the Wrist" Released: 11 October 1974; 2. "Now I'm Here" Released: 17 January 1975

Sheer Heart Attack is the third studio album by the British rock band Queen, released on 8 November 1974 by EMI Records in the United Kingdom and by Elektra Records in the United States. Departing from the progressive themes featured on their first two albums, the album featured more pop-centric and conventional rock tracks and marked a step towards the "classic" Queen sound. It was produced by the band and Roy Thomas Baker, and launched Queen to mainstream popularity in the UK and throughout the world.

The album's first single "Killer Queen" reached number two on the UK singles chart and provided the band with their first top 20 hit in the US, peaking at number 12 on the Billboard Hot 100. Sheer Heart Attack was the first Queen album to hit the US top 20, peaking at number 12 on the Billboard Top LPs & Tape Chart in 1975. It has been acknowledged for containing "a wealth of outstanding hard rock guitar tracks". Retrospectively, it has been listed by multiple publications as one of the band's best works and has been deemed an essential glam rock album.

== Background and recording ==
"Nobody knew we were going to be told we had two weeks to write Sheer Heart Attack. And we had to – it was only thing we could do. Brian was in hospital."

— Freddie Mercury

After completing their second album, Queen embarked on their Queen II Tour as a support act for Mott the Hoople. After touring extensively throughout the UK, the two groups decided to tour together in the US, marking Queen's first tour in the country. The bands would remain on friendly terms for the rest of their career, with Ian Hunter performing "All the Young Dudes" at the Freddie Mercury Tribute Concert. Queen played their first US show on 16 April 1974 in Denver, Colorado, as a support, which Freddie Mercury reportedly disliked, saying: "Being support is one of the most traumatic experiences of my life". At the climax of the tour in Boston, Brian May was discovered to have hepatitis, possibly from the use of a contaminated needle during vaccinations the group received before travelling to Australia. The remainder of the tour was subsequently cancelled and Queen flew back home, where May was hospitalised.

In June, the band gathered together at Trident Studios to start rehearsing material for the album. Koh Hasebe interviewed Mercury, Roger Taylor and John Deacon when they were rehearsing on 13 June. At the beginning of July, May joined them for rehearsals. The band were just preparing to record, and on 7 July, they trekked three and a half hours to get to the Rockfield Studios in Wales, where they would record ten backing tracks, finishing on 28 July. At the start of August, work shifted to Wessex Sound Studios. Work there would not last long, however, as May, who was starting to feel uneasy, went to a specialist clinic on 2 August. He collapsed at the clinic, as a result of a duodenal ulcer, and would be operated on the following day, but discharged from the hospital soon after so he could recover at home. While the band were overdubbing at Wessex, May booked studio time at AIR Studios, where he recorded "Dear Friends" and "She Makes Me". In the meantime, Taylor and Deacon made an appearance at an EMI/Radio Luxembourg motor rally at Brands Hatch on 11 August. By late August, May was working with the band again, and the rest of the band would add their parts to the songs he had recorded. There was still one song that needed to be recorded as the band worked into September, and that was "Now I'm Here". They recorded the backing track for this one at Wessex, and saved the rest to be completed during the mixing sessions.

Mixing commenced in the middle of September. The band were still overdubbing at this point, so they hired someone to deliver tapes from recording studio to mixing studio via motorcycle. The heart of the mixing sessions took place at Trident Studios, and one or two days was spent mixing each of the majority of the songs. "Brighton Rock", on the other hand, took four days to mix, with six hours' worth of different mixes created during that time. Each song was mixed in little edited sections that were about fifteen to twenty seconds in length. At this point, Trident had just installed a 24-track machine in their studio that had been around since 1972, but was not functioning until 1974. In fact, the album was Trident's first 24-track project. Even though Trident had expanded their recording flexibility by eight tracks, this was still not enough to be able to mix each track individually. "Bring Back That Leroy Brown", for example, had 70 vocal tracks and had to be mixed down to work with the 24-track mixer.

On 20 September, it was announced the band were attempting to secure a release date for the album of 1 November, though it seemed unlikely that they would be finished in time to meet that deadline. They mixed "Now I'm Here", which was the last thing to be mixed, on 22 October. May did an interview the next day (which was published on 26 October) that explained what finishing the album was like. In total, the band used four different studios in the making of Sheer Heart Attack: most of the backing tracks were recorded at Rockfield, two backing tracks and some guitar overdubs were recorded at AIR Studios, most of the overdubs and one backing track were recorded at Wessex, and the mixing was done at Trident.

== Songs ==
The album noticeably shifts away from the progressive rock themes of its predecessors, and has been categorised as hard rock and glam rock. The Daily Vault described it as "an important transition album" because it showcased "what the band would soon become while giving a nod to their hard-rock past," while Stephen Thomas Erlewine of AllMusic observed that, although there are still references to the fantasy themes of their earlier works, particularly on "In the Lap of the Gods" and "Lily of the Valley", "the fantasy does not overwhelm as it did on the first two records".

"Killer Queen" was written in a single night, which contrasts with the, as Mercury put it, "ages" it took to write "The March of the Black Queen". "Brighton Rock" was written during the making of Queen II; "Stone Cold Crazy" had its genesis in Mercury's pre-Queen band Wreckage; and Mercury wrote "Flick of the Wrist" during May's illness-induced absence. As it included the first song written by John Deacon that Queen recorded ("Misfire") alongside tracks written by the other members of the band, Sheer Heart Attack was the first of the group's albums to contain at least one song written by each member; "Stone Cold Crazy" was the band's first song for which all four members shared the writing credit.

=== "Brighton Rock" ===
"Brighton Rock" was written by Brian May during the Queen II sessions, but was not recorded at that time, as the group felt it would not fit with the rest of the album. Lyrically, it tells the story of two young lovers named Jenny and Jimmy, who meet in Brighton on a public holiday. Mods travelling to Brighton on bank holidays was a popular narrative at the time, as in the Who's Quadrophenia.

The song includes a three-minute unaccompanied guitar solo interlude, which makes extensive use of delay to build up guitar harmony and contrapuntal melodic lines. It grew out of May's experimentation with an Echoplex unit while he attempted to recreate his guitar orchestrations for live performances of "Son and Daughter". He had made modifications to the original unit so he could change the delay times, and ran each echo through a separate amplifier to avoid interference.

The studio version of the solo only contains one "main" guitar and one "echoed" guitar for a short section, but, live, May would usually split his guitar signal into one "main" and two "echoed" guitars, with each going to a separate bank of amplifiers. In concert, the solo has been performed as part of "Brighton Rock", in a medley with another song, or as a standalone piece. For example, May performed some of it at the closing ceremony of the 2012 Summer Olympics in London. Considered one of May's finest solos, Guitar World ranked it No. 41 on their list of the 100 Greatest Guitar Solos of All Time.

The start of the song is a carousel; this was taken from a sound effects album called Authentic Sound Effects Volume 1 originally released in 1960.

=== "Killer Queen" ===
"Killer Queen" was written by Freddie Mercury and was the band's first international hit single. Mercury played a jangle piano as well as a grand piano on the recording. After it charted as a single, the band performed the song on Top of the Pops.

=== "Tenement Funster"/"Flick of the Wrist"/"Lily of the Valley" ===
Roger Taylor wrote "Tenement Funster" about youth and rebellion and sang lead vocals, while John Deacon played the song's prominent acoustic guitar parts in May's absence. It segues into Mercury's "Flick of the Wrist" (which was released, along with "Killer Queen", as a double A-sided single), and then into a softer, piano-based Mercury song, "Lily of the Valley", making the three songs continuous.

=== "Now I'm Here" ===
"Now I'm Here" was written by May while hospitalised, and recalls the group's early tour supporting Mott the Hoople. It was recorded during the last week of the sessions for the album, with May playing piano.

=== "In the Lap of the Gods" ===
"In the Lap of the Gods" was written by Mercury and featured multiple vocal overdubs from himself and Roger Taylor. It features one of the highest notes on the album, sung by Taylor.

=== "Stone Cold Crazy" ===
"Stone Cold Crazy" was one of the earliest tracks that Queen performed live, and had several different arrangements before being recorded for Sheer Heart Attack. No band member was able to remember who had written the lyrics when the album was released, so they shared the writing credit, the first of their songs to do so. The lyrics deal with gangsters and include a reference to Al Capone. The track has a fast tempo and heavy distortion, presaging speed metal. Music magazine Q described "Stone Cold Crazy" as "thrash metal before the term was invented", although this was not the first song in the style of "proto-thrash", with Deep Purple's "Hard Lovin' Man" predating it by four years. The song was played live at almost every Queen concert between 1974 and 1978 and also in the cut version during European leg of The Works Tour in 1984.

Metallica covered the song as their contribution to the 1990 compilation album Rubáiyát: Elektra's 40th Anniversary. This cover version won a Grammy Award in 1991; it also appeared on the band's compilation Garage Inc.

=== "Dear Friends" ===
"Dear Friends" is a ballad written by May and sung by Mercury.

=== "Misfire" ===
"Misfire" was John Deacon's first individual composition for the band, and featured him playing the guitar solo and all guitar parts on the track except for some parts at the end of the song, in which Brian's Red Special becomes more prominent.

=== "Bring Back That Leroy Brown" ===
The title of "Bring Back That Leroy Brown" alludes to the then-recent hit "Bad Bad Leroy Brown" by American singer-songwriter Jim Croce, who had died in a plane crash the previous year. Written by Mercury, "Bring Back That Leroy Brown" features him playing grand piano and jangle piano, as well as doing multiple vocal overdubs. May plays a short section on ukulele-banjo, and Deacon plays a line on the double bass. DRUM! Magazine commended Taylor's drum work on the song: "It really shows off Taylor’s versatility. He nails dozens of kicks throughout this fast and tricky song and proves that he could’ve been a big band drummer or ably fit into any theatrical pit band if Queen hadn’t worked out so well for him. Honky-tonk piano, upright bass, ukulele-banjo, and a smokin' drummer all add up to a rollicking good time."

=== "She Makes Me (Stormtrooper in Stilettoes)" ===
"She Makes Me (Stormtrooper in Stilettoes)" was written and sung by May with him and Deacon playing acoustic guitars.

=== "In the Lap of the Gods...Revisited" ===
"In the Lap of the Gods...Revisited" was one of Queen's set-closers from 1974 to 1977. During the 1986 Magic tour, it was performed again in a medley, where it segued into "Seven Seas of Rhye".

== Reception and legacy ==
Retrospective reviews
Review scores
Source	Rating
AllMusic	4.5/5 stars
The Daily Vault	B+
Backseat Mafia	8.5/10
Encyclopedia of Popular Music	4/5 stars
MusicHound Rock	3.5/5 stars
Pitchfork Media	9/10
PopMatters	8/10
Q	4/5 stars
Record Collector	4/5 stars
Uncut	4/5 stars

At the time of its release, NME called the album: "A feast. No duffers, and four songs that will just run and run: 'Killer Queen', 'Flick of the Wrist', 'Now I'm Here', and 'In the Lap of the Gods...Revisited'." The Winnipeg Free Press commended "Brian May's multi-tracked guitar, Freddie Mercury's stunning vocalising and Roy Thomas Baker's dynamic production work", calling the album "a no-holds barred, full-scale attack on the senses". Circus referred to the album as "perhaps the heaviest, rockingest assault on these shores we've enjoyed in some time". Rolling Stone awarded the album a positive rating of 3 stars and wrote: "If it's hard to love, it's hard not to admire: this band is skilled, after all, and it dares." John Mendelsohn, however, was unimpressed, writing: "I hunted all over both sides of this latest album for something, anything, even remotely as magnificent as 'Keep Yourself Alive' or 'Father to Son', only to end up empty-eared and bawling." As 1974 drew to a close, the album was ranked by Disc as the third best of the year and tied for 24th place on NME's end-of-year list.

In a review for the Chicago Tribune, Greg Kot awards the album a generally positive rating of 2 and a half stars, while noting that this album was where "...the songs became more concise"

Professional ratings
Review scores
Source	Rating
Chicago Tribune	2.5/4 stars
Rolling Stone	"Sheer Heart Attack". Rolling Stone. 8 May 1975.

In a retrospective review, AllMusic said that "the theatricality is now wielded on everyday affairs, which ironically makes them sound larger than life. And this sense of scale, combined with the heavy guitars, pop hooks, and theatrical style, marks the true unveiling of Queen, making Sheer Heart Attack as [sic] the moment where they truly came into their own." Q called the record "indispensable" and "one of the great pop/rock admixtures of the '70s". Pitchfork wrote: "Sheer Heart Attack not only improves on every aspect of their sound suggested by the first two records, but delivers some of the finest music of their career ... this is the band at the height of its powers." Jon Bryan of Backseat Mafia described it as "the first album where Queen got it unarguably right", noting that "such obvious arrogance suited them".

Benjamin Ray of the Daily Vault felt that "Queen somehow manages to sound like every rock band of the 70s on here, including Rush, Zeppelin and even Uriah Heep." He noted the difference was that "Queen actually tries to be pretentious and bombastic, and often they are so over the top one can't help but be entertained", finally concluding that it was "their most fun and showcases everything they did right." The BBC wrote: "they stretched contemporary production methods to their very limit with multi-layered vocals and guitars and Freddie's vaudevillian streak finally emerged ... this was the album that finally saw Queen find their true voice." Rock historian Paul Fowles wrote that Sheer Heart Attack "saw the band become increasingly focused on the emerging cult figure of Mercury" and his "unique brand of rock theater", especially on the single "Killer Queen".

=== Accolades ===
Publication	Country	Accolade	Year	Rank
1001 Albums You Must Hear Before You Die	United Kingdom	1001 Albums You Must Hear Before You Die	2005	*
Classic Rock	United Kingdom	The 100 Greatest British Rock Albums Ever	2006	28
Classic Rock	United Kingdom	The 200 Greatest Albums of the 70's (20 greatest of 1974)	2006	*
Kerrang!	United Kingdom	Poll: The 100 Best British Rock Albums Ever	2005	8
Kerrang!	United Kingdom	The 100 Greatest Rock Albums Ever	2007	45
Mojo	United Kingdom	100 Greatest Guitar Albums	2002	72
Mojo	United Kingdom	70 of the Greatest Albums of the 70's	2006	*
Mojo	United Kingdom	The 100 Records That Changed the World	2007	88
NME	United Kingdom	Poll: Greatest 100 Albums of All Time	2006	63
Radio Caroline	United Kingdom	Poll: Top 100 Albums	1977	50
Trouser Press	United States	Best Albums of the 1970s	1980	*
Virgin	United Kingdom	Poll: All Time Album Top 1000 Albums	2000	492
Rock Hard	Germany	The 500 Greatest Rock & Metal Albums of All Time	2005	308
* denotes an unranked list

=== Mercury's appraisal ===
The album is very varied, we took it to extreme I suppose, but we are very interested in studio techniques and wanted to use what was available. We learnt a lot about technique while we were making the first two albums. Of course there has been some criticism, and the constructive criticism has been very good for us. But to be frank I'm not that keen on the British music press, and they've been pretty unfair to us. I feel that up and coming journalists, by the large, put themselves above the artists. They've certainly been under a misconception about us. We've been called a supermarket hype. But if you see us up on a stage, that's what we're all about. We are basically a rock band.

— Freddie Mercury

=== 2011 reissue ===
On 8 November 2010, record company Universal Music announced that a remastered and expanded reissue of the album would be released in May 2011, as part of a new deal between Queen and Universal Music, which meant the band's association with EMI Records would come to an end after almost 40 years. Queen's entire studio catalogue was reissued in 2011.

== Track listing ==
=== Original release ===
All lead vocals by Freddie Mercury unless noted.

Side one
No.	Title	Writer(s)	Lead vocals	Length
1.	"Brighton Rock"	Brian May	Mercury with May	5:08
2.	"Killer Queen"	Mercury		3:01
3.	"Tenement Funster"	Roger Taylor	Taylor	2:48
4.	"Flick of the Wrist"	Mercury		3:19
5.	"Lily of the Valley"	Mercury		1:43
6.	"Now I'm Here"	May		4:10

Side two
No.	Title	Writer(s)	Lead vocals	Length
7.	"In the Lap of the Gods"	Mercury		3:20
8.	"Stone Cold Crazy"	Mercury; May; Taylor; John Deacon		2:12
9.	"Dear Friends"	May		1:07
10.	"Misfire"	Deacon		1:50
11.	"Bring Back That Leroy Brown"	Mercury		2:13
12.	"She Makes Me (Stormtrooper in Stilettoes)"	May	May	4:08
13.	"In the Lap of the Gods...Revisited"	Mercury		3:42
Total length:				38:41

Bonus track (1991 Hollywood Records reissue)
No.	Title	Length
14.	"Stone Cold Crazy" (1991 bonus remix by Michael Wagener)	2:12
Total length:		40:53

=== Universal Music reissue (2011) ===
Bonus EP
No.	Title	Length
1.	"Now I'm Here" (live at Hammersmith Odeon, December 1975)	4:27
2.	"Flick Of The Wrist" (BBC session, October 1974)	3:26
3.	"Tenement Funster" (BBC session, October 1974)	2:59
4.	"Bring Back That Leroy Brown" (a cappella mix 2011)	2:18
5.	"In the Lap of the Gods...Revisited" (live at Wembley Stadium, July 1986)	2:35
Total length:		15:45

=== iTunes deluxe edition ===
Bonus videos
No.	Title	Length
1.	"Killer Queen" (Top of the Pops, Version 2)
2.	"Stone Cold Crazy" (live at the Rainbow 1974)
3.	"Now I'm Here" (live at the Forum, Montreal 1981)

== Personnel ==
Personnel taken from Sheer Heart Attack liner notes.

Queen

- Freddie Mercury – vocals, piano, jangle piano, Hammond organ on “Now I'm Here”
- Brian May – guitars, vocals, piano on "Now I'm Here" and "Dear Friends", banjolele
- Roger Taylor – drums, vocals, percussion
- John Deacon – bass guitar, double bass, acoustic guitar, guitars on "Misfire"

Production

- Roy Thomas Baker – production
- Queen – production, sleeve design
- Mike Stone – engineering
- Mick Rock – art direction, photography

== Charts ==
=== Weekly charts ===
Weekly chart performance for Sheer Heart Attack
Chart (1974–1975)	Peak position
Australian Albums (Kent Music Report)	19
Canada Top Albums/CDs (RPM)	6
Dutch Albums (Album Top 100)	7
Finnish Albums (The Official Finnish Charts)	7
French Albums (SNEP)	6
Japanese Albums (Oricon)	23
Norwegian Albums (VG-lista)	9
UK Albums (Official Charts)	2
US Billboard 200	12

2011 weekly chart performance for Sheer Heart Attack
Chart (2011)	Peak position
Scottish Albums (Official Charts)	83

=== Year-end charts ===
Year-end chart performance for Sheer Heart Attack
Chart (1975)	Peak position
Australian Albums (Kent Music Report)	96
Canada Top Albums/CDs (RPM)	43
Japanese Albums (Oricon)	32
UK Albums (OCC	39
US Billboard 200	38

== Certifications ==
Certifications for Sheer Heart Attack
Region	Certification	Certified units/sales
Canada (Music Canada)	Platinum	100,000^{^}
Japan (RIAJ)	Gold	100,000^{^}
Poland (ZPAV) 2008 Agora SA album reissue	Platinum	20,000^{*}
Netherlands (NVPI)	Gold	30,000
Sweden (GLF)	Gold	50,000^{^}
United Kingdom (BPI)	Platinum	300,000^{^}
United States (RIAA)	Gold	500,000^{^}
^{*} Sales figures based on certification alone.^{^} Shipments figures based on certification alone.
