= Deep Cut (play) =

Play written by Philip Ralph

- Written by: Philip Ralph
- Original language: English
- Genre: Documentary/Drama
- Setting: Deepcut Barracks

Premiere
- Date premiered: 2008
- Place premiered: Edinburgh, Scotland

Deep Cut is a play to date performed by Cardiff theatre company Sherman Cymru and written by Philip Ralph. It premiered at the Edinburgh Festival in 2008 and won the Amnesty International Freedom of Expression Award in the same year as well as best Actor (Ciaran McIntyre) and Best Actress (Rhian Blythe) awards with The Stage's Stage Awards for Acting Excellence. It concerns the death by gunshot of four trainees and the aftermath at Deepcut Barracks in Surrey (1995–2002) and is based on firsthand testimonies. The play transferred to the Tricycle Theatre for a four-week run in 2009.

The rights to the play were optioned in 2009 by Revolution Films for an unspecified period.

== See also ==
- Deaths at Deepcut army barracks
