= Good Company (Queen song) =

Song by Queen

from the album A Night at the Opera
- Published: Queen Music Ltd.
- Released: 28 November 1975
- Recorded: August–November 1975
- Genre: Dixieland jazz
- Length: 3:26
- Label: EMI; Elektra
- Songwriter: Brian May
- Producers: Queen; Roy Thomas Baker

Music video
- "Good Company" on YouTube

"Good Company" is a song by British rock band Queen, which was written by Brian May. May also played a "Genuine Aloha" banjo uke and provided all the vocals on the track.

== May's comments on the song ==
The horn lines on "Good Company" were done on four kinds of guitars. I was very keen in those days on recreating that sort of atmosphere. I mainly got the sound with small amplifiers. I used John Deacon's little amplifier and a volume pedal. For the trombone and trumpet sounds. I would record every note individually: Do it and then drop in. Incredibly painstaking! It took ages and ages. I listened to a lot of traditional jazz music when I was young, so I tried to get the phrasing as it would be if it were played by that instrument.

— Brian May 1982

Yes, it's all guitar all those instruments. That was a little fetish of mine. I used to listen to Traditional Jazz quite a lot, in particular, the twenties revival stuff which wasn’t actually Traditional Jazz but more arranged stuff like The Temperance Seven who were recreating something which was popular in the twenties, sort of dance tunes really. I was very impressed by the way those arrangements were done, you know, the nice smooth sound and those lovely changes between chords. Because they were much more rich in chords than most modern songs are. So many chord changes in a short time, lots of intermingling parts. So I wanted to do one of those things and the song just happened to come out while I was plunking away at the ukulele and the song itself was no trouble to write at all. But actually doing the arrangements for the wind section, as it was supposed to be. There’s a guitar trumpet and a guitar clarinet and a guitar trombone and a sort of extra thing, I don’t really know what it was supposed to be (chuckles) on the top. I spent a lot of time doing those and to get the effect of the instruments I was doing one note at a time, with a pedal and building them up. So you can imagine how long it took. We experimented with the mikes and various little tiny amplifiers to get just the right sound. So I actually made a study of the kind of thing that those instruments could play so it would sound like those and get the authentic flavour. It was a bit of fun but, it was a serious serious bit of work in that a lot of time went into it.

— Brian May 1983

== Personnel ==
- Brian May – lead and backing vocals, guitars, ukulele, guitar jazz band
- Roger Taylor – drums
- John Deacon – bass guitar
