= Flick of the Wrist =

- 1988 UK reissue picture sleeve

Single by Queen

from the album Sheer Heart Attack
- A-side: "Killer Queen" (double A-side)
- Released: 11 October 1974 (UK); 21 October 1974 (US)
- Recorded: July–September 1974
- Genre: Hard rock; glam rock
- Length: 3:21
- Label: EMI (UK); Elektra (US)
- Songwriter: Freddie Mercury
- Producers: Roy Thomas Baker; Queen

Queen singles chronology
"Seven Seas of Rhye" (1974)	"Killer Queen" / "Flick of the Wrist" (1974)	"Now I'm Here" (1975)

"Flick of the Wrist" is a song by Freddie Mercury. It was recorded by the British rock band Queen, released as a double A-side with "Killer Queen" in the United Kingdom, Canada, the Netherlands, the United States and most other territories, and included on Queen's 1974 album Sheer Heart Attack.

== Background ==
Freddie Mercury explained that the unpleasant character in the song was not based on anyone in particular: "I wrote it as a sort of tongue-in-cheek story about the con-men and rip-off artists we're always running into. Our manager would like to think it's about him, but it's not." The song includes Mercury singing octave vocals throughout the verses, and the chorus features a call-and-response style section between the backing and lead vocal parts. When Brian May returned to work, having recovered from hepatitis, he had not heard the song before he recorded his guitar and backing vocals.

== Album version ==
As it appears on the album, "Flick of the Wrist" is the middle song of a three-track series of songs which seamlessly overlap, segueing from one to the next: "Tenement Funster", "Flick of the Wrist" and "Lily of the Valley". Each song was recorded separately and later mixed together to form the unbroken stretch of music. Because of this structure, the record company had to select points to separate each track on CD re-issues of the album.

The original, non-segued master recordings of "Tenement Funster", "Flick of the Wrist" and "Lily of the Valley" were used for certain single releases, such the Japanese 3-inch CD single re-issue of "Good Old Fashioned Lover Boy" ("Tenement Funster"), the Dutch AA-side version of "Flick of the Wrist" (see below) and the 1975 US-only re-issue of "Keep Yourself Alive" ("Lily of the Valley").

== Single versions ==
All the single versions and edits are from the original album recording.

The Dutch AA-side version features the complete song without the segueing, overlapping sections from "Tenement Funster" and "Lily of the Valley".

The UK AA-side version also features on the 1991 Japanese 3-inch CD single of "Killer Queen"/"Flick of the Wrist".

The US AA-side version (the same as that issued in Canada) has a much more pronounced edit at the beginning, with the first 18 seconds of the song absent. It ends with a fade-out over the segue into "Lily of the Valley", in which the latter's opening piano is heard.

== BBC version ==
On 16 October 1974, Queen recorded a BBC session at Maida Vale 4 Studios in London. One of the songs recorded was "Flick of the Wrist". This performance features parts of the original album backing track with new vocals by Freddie Mercury and a new guitar solo by Brian May, differing entirely from that which appears on the album.

== Personnel ==
- Freddie Mercury – lead and backing vocals, piano
- Brian May – guitars, backing vocals
- Roger Taylor – drums, backing vocals, percussion
- John Deacon – bass guitar
