= Queen II =

1974 studio album by Queen

Studio album by Queen
- Released: 8 March 1974
- Recorded: 5 August 1973 – 20 February 1974
- Studios: Trident, London
- Genres: Art rock; hard rock; glam rock; heavy metal; progressive rock
- Length: 40:42
- Labels: EMI; Elektra
- Producers: Roy Thomas Baker; Queen; Robin Geoffrey Cable

Queen chronology
Queen (1973)	Queen II (1974)	Sheer Heart Attack (1974)

Singles from Queen II
- 1. "Seven Seas of Rhye" Released: 22 February 1974

Queen II is the second studio album by the British rock band Queen. It was released on 8 March 1974 by EMI Records in the UK and on 9 April 1974 by Elektra Records in the US. It was recorded at Trident Studios and Langham 1 Studios, London, in August 1973 with co-producers Roy Thomas Baker and Robin Geoffrey Cable, and engineered by Mike Stone. It is significant for being the first album to contain many elements of the band's signature sound of multi-layered overdubs, vocal harmonies, and varied musical styles.

Described as "arguably the heaviest Queen album", Queen II marked the end of the first phase of the band's career. The album combines a heavy rock sound with art rock and progressive rock elements, and has been called "a pillar of grandiose, assaultive hard rock" by the Rock and Roll Hall of Fame. Queen II is not a concept album but a collection of songs with a loose theme running throughout. The two sides of the original LP were labelled "Side White" and "Side Black" (instead of the conventional sides A and B), with corresponding photos of the band dressed in black on the front cover and white on the inner gatefold. The white side has songs with a more emotional theme and the black side is almost entirely about fantasy, often with quite dark themes. Mick Rock's cover photograph was frequently re-used by the band throughout its career, including the music videos for the songs "Bohemian Rhapsody" (1975) and "One Vision" (1985).

Released to an initially mixed critical reception, Queen II remains one of the band's lesser-known albums. Nonetheless, it has been praised by critics and fans..

== Background and recording ==
Led Zeppelin and the Who are probably in Queen II somewhere, because they were among our favourite groups, but what we are trying to do differently from either of those groups [is] this sort of layered sound. The Who had the open chord guitar sound... but our sound is more based on the overdriven guitar sound... I also wanted to build up textures behind the main melody lines. We were trying to push studio techniques to a new limit for rock groups – it was fulfilling all our dreams, because we didn't have much opportunity for that on the first album.

— Brian May, on Queen II and the band's sound.

Queen performed their first gig on 27 June 1970, but did not finish their self-titled debut album, Queen, until November 1972. In the interim, the band had developed other, more complex material but elected to wait to record it until they had more freedom and experience in the studio. "Father To Son", "Ogre Battle" and "Procession" had all been premiered as early as 1972. "Seven Seas of Rhye" dated to Freddie Mercury's Wreckage days in 1969. "See What a Fool I've Been", the B-side to the "Seven Seas of Rhye" single and "White Queen (As It Began)" were left over from the Smile days. "Stone Cold Crazy", also from Mercury's Wreckage period, had been in the set list for years, but was held back and reworked for the third album, Sheer Heart Attack. Portions of "The Prophet's Song" were also rehearsed during the Queen II sessions, but the song was not completed until the fourth album, A Night at the Opera. Queen insisted that Trident Studios allow them to record at regular hours instead of studio down-time, as they had for the first album. The band approached David Bowie to produce, but he declined because he was then recording Pin Ups and working on songs for Diamond Dogs. Robin Geoffrey Cable, with whom Mercury had worked during the "I Can Hear Music" session, was asked to produce "Nevermore" and "Funny How Love Is", and collaborate with Roy Thomas Baker on the ambitious "March of the Black Queen".

After the commercial failure of the single "Keep Yourself Alive" from the first album, Queen decided it needed a single that did not take "too long to happen" (i.e., without a lengthy guitar intro). "Seven Seas of Rhye", recorded with the specific intention of being the album's leading single, began in a way designed to grab attention. Rehearsals for the Queen II sessions commenced on or around 26 July. (Due to management problems, the first album was finally released as the band prepared to record Queen II.) During these rehearsals, the band were interviewed by Melody Maker and told the magazine that their new album would have a theme of "good versus evil". The band also ended its collaboration with John Anthony, who had co-produced the first album, due to clashes between Mercury and Anthony. On 3 August, the band performed at a gig in Newcastle, then returned to London for a pre-recording rehearsal on 4 August. Sessions began on 5 August with takes 1–12 of the finished version of "Seven Seas of Rhye". On 6 August, they started recording "Father To Son", working on takes 1–4. They continued to work on the album until 9 August, when they made promotional videos for "Keep Yourself Alive" and "Liar" from the debut album.

According to the August 11 issue of Record Mirror, the band was scheduled to go back into the studio on 15 August. However, David Bowie and Ken Scott were producing Pin Ups in the studio Queen had been using. The band were put into Studio 2, with producer Robin Geoffrey Cable. Although this studio only had an 8-track tape machine at the time, Queen decided to work on backing tracks nonetheless. Takes of Nevermore were recorded that day, and Funny How Love Is was recorded on 16 August. Queen had to cancel a studio session on 17 August to perform a gig in Peterborough. They returned to London around 3:00 a.m. Roy Thomas Baker had also left (around 12–18 August) to work with a Danish client named Gasolin', who were recording their album Gasolin' 3. On 18 August, Queen, Baker and Cable recorded the complex backing track for "The March Of The Black Queen". After taking a break for a bank holiday, the band began principal overdubbing on 28 August. Some backing tracks had to be cut into separate multi-tracks because of the extensive overdubbing. (The album's working title became "Over The Top" in reference to overdubbing.) During this period, John Deacon had to do his summer exams. In September, Brian recorded "Procession," which had its live premiere on 13 September when the band played at the Golders Green Hippodrome in London.

On 24 September, the band did their first radio interview with Bob Harris. In early October, Queen met with photographer Mick Rock for the first time to discuss album concept art. They took a short break starting on 12 October to begin a promotional tour around Europe. On 18 October, the band returned to London to continue work on the album. On 3 November, Queen had their first publicity shoot with Mick Rock, producing the album's iconic cover image. Queen took another break from recording in November to tour with Mott The Hoople. Rehearsals began on 5 November and the tour started in Blackburn on 13 November. The band would come near London a few times in early December, and popped into the studio on their days off. The tour ended at the Hammersmith Odeon on 14 December, followed by a standalone gig at Leicester University on 15 December. Rough mixing for the album commenced on 17 December. Martin Hayman of Sounds visited the band on 22 December while they were finishing rough mixes for "Loser In The End", "Ogre Battle", and "The Fairy Feller's Master-Stroke".

Queen went back into the studio in early January. At this point, all of the rough mixes had been finished, and the band were ready to move onto the final stages of production. According to studio documentation, most of the songs were mixed by 19 January, but still required equalization. Brian had also contracted gangrene from a tainted inoculation needle in mid-December, and couldn't attend some sessions. The band flew to Australia on 25 January and performed to an unruly crowd on 27 January that led to the band to storm off stage halfway through their set. On 31 January, Queen returned to London to complete the album. The last pressings were made on 20 February.

== Songs ==
=== Overview ===
The music of Queen II has been attributed to several genres, including hard rock, glam rock, heavy metal, and progressive rock. Music journalist and author Jerry Ewing described the album as displaying a "proggy art rock tendency". Daniel Ross of The Quietus described it as "the exact intersection" between the band's "murky, metallic beginnings" and "the absolute pop perfection incarnation of Queen, leather trousers and Formby pastiches." The band included the comment "and nobody played synthesiser... again" on the album sleeve, a purist principle of May's, as some listeners had mistaken their elaborate multi-tracking and effects, produced by guitar and vocals, as synthesisers.

Rather than the conventional Side 1 and Side 2, the album was split into "Side White" and "Side Black", dominated by May and Mercury compositions respectively. Although some have interpreted it as a concept album, Queen biographer Georg Purvis stated that it is "not a concept album but a collection of songs with a loose theme running throughout." Mercury later confirmed this in a 1976 Sounds interview, citing that "it just evolved to where there was a batch of songs that could be considered aggressive, or a Black Side, and there was a smoother side".

The "White" side is very diverse: four of the five numbers were composed by Brian May, one of which is an instrumental. Freddie Mercury sings two songs; May sings one; and Roger Taylor sings the closing track, which is his only composition on the album. John Deacon played acoustic guitar on "Father to Son" in addition to normal duties on bass guitar. Mercury composed and sang all six songs on the "Black" side.

=== Side White ===
==== "Procession" ====
"Procession" is a short instrumental piece (a funeral march) performed by Brian May on multi-tracked guitar. He recorded it by playing overlapping parts on the Red Special through John Deacon's custom-made amplifier (the Deacy Amp). Roger Taylor also contributes to this instrumental, using only a bass drum pedal.

==== "Father to Son" ====
"Father to Son" was written by May and features heavy metal sections as well as quiet piano parts, in which both May and Mercury played. Like "Procession", "Father to Son" has parts with May on multi-tracked guitar played through the Deacy Amp. It is written from the father's perspective when talking or thinking about his son. Queen immediately added "Father to Son" to their live setlists. In 1975, it was dropped from live shows, but revived a few times in 1976. The song covers a two-octave range: Mercury (G3-A4), Taylor (G4-A5).

==== "White Queen (As It Began)" ====
Written by May in 1968, this song features contrasting acoustic and heavy metal sections. May explained that he conceived the idea for this song while reading The White Goddess by Robert Graves. The song also had personal significance for May; he drew inspiration from a fellow student whom he revered and thought represented the idea of the "perfect woman". In a later interview he said, "I remember being totally in love with this girl from biology, and I never ever talked to her...I [was] dared to ask out this girl, and she became a lifelong friend, it's very strange...". The song features May playing his Hallfredh acoustic guitar. The guitar had been given a replacement hardwood bridge, chiselled flat, with a small piece of fret wire placed between it and the strings, which lay gently above. The strings produce the buzzing effect of a sitar.

"White Queen" was performed regularly between 1974 and 1977, and last performed in London in 1978. The live version usually included a long instrumental break with Mercury on piano that was not part of, or omitted from, the album version.

==== "Some Day One Day" ====
This is the first Queen song to feature May on lead vocals throughout. It also features May on acoustic guitar and electric guitar and the last guitar solo (during the fade-out) features three solo guitars. This kind of complex guitar arrangement is typical of May; however, usually the guitars are harmonious, but in this case, all of the guitars play different parts.

==== "The Loser in the End" ====
"The Loser in the End" was Taylor's sole contribution on the album both as a songwriter and lead vocalist. The original handwritten lyrics of the song, which were nearly shredded in 2004, are the oldest example of handwritten lyrics in the Queen archive.

=== Side Black ===
==== "Ogre Battle" ====
Mercury wrote "Ogre Battle" on guitar (as confirmed by May in several interviews) in 1971 and it was one of the earliest songs in the Queen set list despite not being recorded until the Queen II sessions. The band waited until they could have more studio freedom to do it properly.

The song is one of Queen's heaviest works. The guitar riff and Taylor's drumming give it a very "thrash" sound. The ogre-like screams in the middle are Mercury's, and the high harmonies at the end of the chorus hook are sung by Taylor. As the title suggests, it tells the story of a battle between ogres, and features a May guitar solo and sound effects to simulate the sounds of a battle. The opening of the song is actually the end of the song played in reverse.

A version of "Ogre Battle" was recorded in December 1973 for the BBC Radio 1 Sound of the 70s programme. An acetate was made of an edited version of the BBC recording without the long intro or any of the sound effects in the album version, potentially for release as a second single. However, other sources state that "The Fairy Feller's Master-Stroke" was also considered for the second single.

"Ogre Battle" was a staple of the band's live set up to and including the A Day at the Races Tour, and was only played a couple more times on the North American leg of the News of the World Tour before being dropped from the set for good.

==== "The Fairy Feller's Master-Stroke" ====
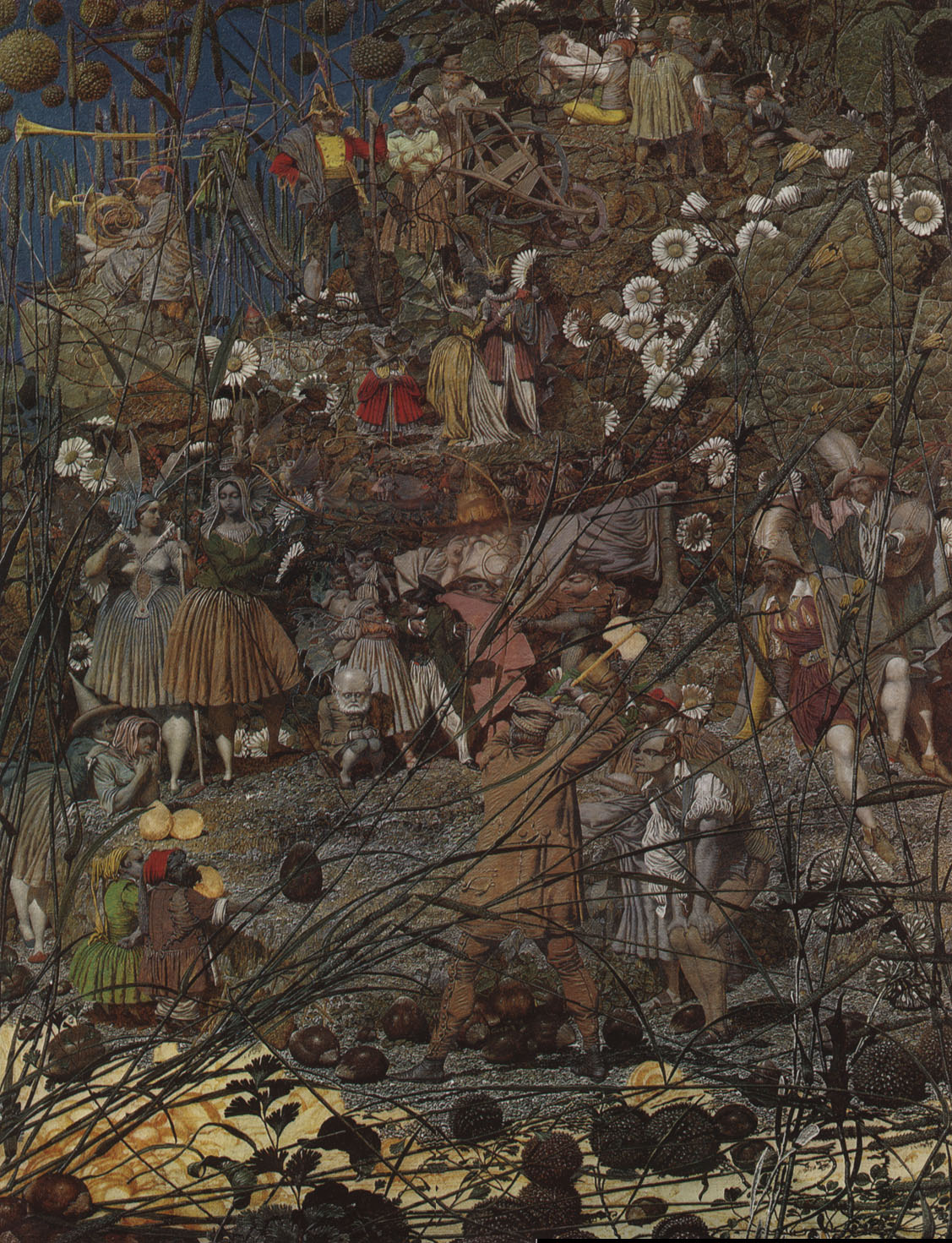
The Fairy Feller's Master-Stroke by Richard Dadd

Mercury was inspired by Richard Dadd's painting The Fairy Feller's Master-Stroke at the Tate Gallery in London. The fantasy-based lyrics make direct reference to characters and vignettes detailed in the painting and in Dadd's companion poem, Elimination of a Picture & its Subject—called The Feller's Master Stroke. Characters include Queen Mab, Waggoner Will, the Tatterdemalion, and others. The use of the word "quaere" in the twice-repeated line "What a quaere fellow" has no reference to Mercury's sexuality, according to Roger Taylor.

In some markets the album included a fold-out cover with a reproduction of the painting. Author Neil Gaiman wrote about the painting and the album on his blog:

Reason tells me that I would have first encountered the painting itself, the enigmatically titled "Fairy Feller's Master Stroke," reproduced, pretty much full-sized, in the fold-out cover of a Queen album, at the age of fourteen or thereabouts, and it made no impression upon me at all. That's one of the odd things about it. You have to see it in the flesh, paint on canvas, the real thing, which hangs, mostly, when it isn't travelling, in the Pre-Raphaelite room of the Tate Gallery, out of place among the grand gold-framed Pre-Raphaelite beauties, all of them so much more huge and artful than the humble fairy court walking through the daisies, for it to become real. And when you see it several things will become apparent; some immediately, some eventually.

Gaiman wrote a longer essay about the painting for Intelligent Life.

For the intricately arranged studio recording, Mercury played harpsichord as well as piano, and Roy Thomas Baker played the castanets. Taylor called this song Queen's "biggest stereo experiment", referring to the use of panning in the mix.

The song was performed only a few times during the Queen II Tour, and there was thought to be no live recording of the song until 2014, when it was released on Live at the Rainbow '74.

==== "Nevermore" ====
The previous track ends with a three-part vocal harmony from Mercury, May, and Taylor which flows into Mercury playing the piano. This piano carries on to open this track making "Ogre Battle", "The Fairy Feller's Master-Stroke" and the current track, into a medley. All the vocal parts were performed by Mercury, who added some contemporary piano "ring" effects as well. These effects were widely suspected to be synthesisers; however, they were created by someone plucking the piano strings while Mercury played the notes. "Nevermore" is a short ballad written by Mercury about the feelings after a heartbreak.

==== "The March of the Black Queen" ====
Mercury had been working on this song even before Queen formed. In a 1974 interview with Melody Maker, he said, "... that song took me ages to complete. I wanted to give it everything, to be self-indulgent or whatever." The multifaceted composition, the band's second longest (6:34), is one of two Queen songs (the other being "Bohemian Rhapsody") containing polyrhythm/polymeter (two different time signatures simultaneously 8/8 and 12/8) and a simpler polyrhythm around the end uptempo section, which is very rare for popular music. The lead vocals cover two and a half octaves (G2 – C5).

May regards it as a precursor to "Bohemian Rhapsody", stating, "You've got to bear in mind that we'd already made 'My Fairy King' on the first album and we'd done 'The March of the Black Queen' on the second album, so we were well in tune with Freddie's excursions into strange areas, and that was something that we really enjoyed." Taylor recalled in a 1977 interview, "The tape went transparent, genuinely... It was 16-track... The tape had gone over the (recording) head so many times, overdubbing, that the oxide had worn off." A similar anecdote is told about the "Bohemian Rhapsody" sessions.

Despite never being released as a single, it remains a favourite amongst Queen's fans. The full piece was too complicated to be performed live; however, the uptempo section containing the lines "My life is in your hands, I'll foe and I'll fie..." etc. was sometimes included in a live medley, with vocals by Mercury and Taylor, during the 1970s. The opening piano piece is only known to have been played live once, at Providence Civic Center on 14 November 1978 (likely in response to a fan shouting for the song near the beginning of the concert). After playing the intro the band quickly transitioned into "Bohemian Rhapsody". This was also the final time a Queen II track would be played live until the revival of "Seven Seas of Rhye" in 1984 for The Works Tour.

This song ends with an ascending note progression, which climaxes in the first second of the following track. The song segues into the next track, "Funny How Love Is".

==== "Funny How Love Is" ====
"Funny How Love Is" was created in the studio. Mercury wrote it and played the piano while Robin Cable produced. It was produced using the "wall of sound" technique. The song was never performed live, largely due to the demanding high-register vocals from Mercury throughout the song.

==== "Seven Seas of Rhye" ====
Mercury began developing "Seven Seas of Rhye" in 1969 when he was with the band Wreckage. He eventually fleshed the song out with contributions from May. In the documentary Queen: Days of Our Lives, May recalled, "I've probably never spoken about this before, ever, but I remember 'Seven Seas of Rhye' being—it was Freddie's idea. He had this lovely little riff idea on the piano, and I think all the middle eighth is stuff that I did. So we definitely worked on it together. But when it came to the album coming out, Freddie went, 'I wrote that.' And we all went, 'Okay.' [laughs] Because it didn't seem like that big a deal. But Freddie said, 'You know, I wrote the words and it was my idea, so it's my song.' The sort of unwritten law was the person who brought the song in would get the credit for writing that song, and the money for writing that song. Much, much later in Queen history, we recognized this fact."

Along with "Lily of the Valley" from Sheer Heart Attack, the song references a fantasy world or kingdom named Rhye. "It's really fictitious," Mercury told interviewer Tom Browne in 1977. "It's a figment of your imagination." A short, instrumental version of "Seven Seas of Rhye" was included as the outro on their first album, titled as "Seven Seas of Rhye...", with the intent of starting this album with the full version. A similar idea occurred with the old music hall song "I Do Like To Be Beside the Seaside", which is sung at the end of "Seven Seas of Rhye" here and whistled during the intro to the third album, Sheer Heart Attack. Ken Testi recalled, "I joined in on the reprise at the end of 'Seven Seas of Rhye'. So did Pat McConnell and a whole bunch of us. I recall an awful lot of reverb, and Brian played the stylophone on it, but it was done in one day and we were all totally pissed at the time."

"Seven Seas of Rhye" features a distinctive arpeggiated piano introduction. On the Queen II recording, the arpeggios are played with both hands, an octave apart, whereas on the abbreviated Queen recording, and most live performances, Mercury played the simpler one-handed version of these arpeggios. The theme also appears at the end of "It's a Beautiful Day (reprise)" on the band's final album Made in Heaven (1995).

== Artwork and packaging ==
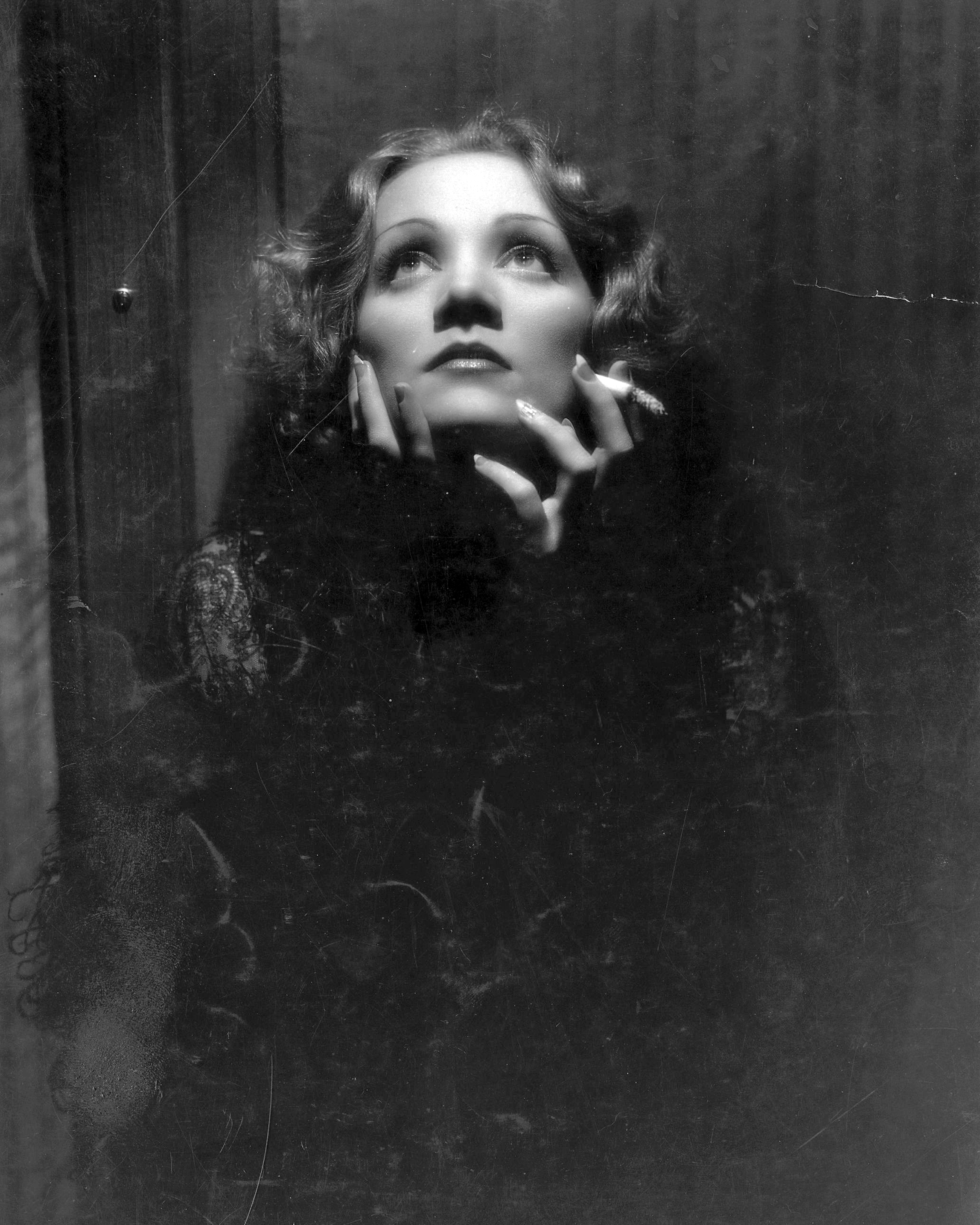
Inspiration was drawn from this image of Marlene Dietrich in Shanghai Express.

Rock photographer Mick Rock was engaged to create the album's artwork. In Rock's words, the band wanted to "graft some of [the trademark] decadent 'glam' sensibility" of his previous work with artists such as David Bowie, Iggy Pop and Lou Reed. According to Rock, Queen were looking to grab people's attention with the cover, especially since their first album had failed to do so. "They realised that if you could catch people's eyes you could get them interested in the music."

The brief he received from the band conceived a black and white theme for the album. The cover features a photograph described by VH1 as "Queen standing in diamond formation, heads tilted back like Easter Island statues" against a black background. The iconic chiaroscuro image of Queen was inspired by a similar photograph of Marlene Dietrich from the 1932 film Shanghai Express. "And of course no one was ever more 'glam' than the divine Ms Dietrich," Rock quipped. "It was just one of those flashes of inspiration that happens sometimes," Rock explained. "There was a feeling that [echoing the Dietrich pose] might be pretentious," but Rock convinced the band otherwise. "It made them look like much bigger a deal than they were at the time, but it was a true reflection of their music." Rock stated Mercury loved to quote Oscar Wilde. "Often, that which today is considered pretentious is tomorrow considered state of the art. The important thing is to be considered." Rock added, "To Freddie, that word [pretentious] was meaningless – 'But is it fabulous?' was all that mattered. Those were the days of androgyny, and Freddie was prepared to push it quite a way". Freddie added, "It doesn't have any special meaning, but we were fascinated with this type of thing, and the wardrobe we used at the time described it perfectly well". The image would later be brought to life for the "Bohemian Rhapsody" music video.

To expand on the black and white theme, Rock made a second image of the band, dressed in white against a white background, that was used in the album's gatefold, advertising, and the "Seven Seas of Rhye" single sleeve.

== Release ==
After the album's completion at the end of August 1973, Queen immediately added "Ogre Battle", "Procession" and "Father to Son" to their live set lists and toured extensively. Once again, however, EMI delayed the album's release since the first album had only just been issued in the UK and had yet to be released in the US. Other problems beset the album's release: the energy conservation measures put in place during the 1973 oil crisis delayed its manufacture by several months; then, when released, John Deacon was credited as "Deacon John", and the band insisted it had to be corrected.

Queen II was released on 8 March 1974. The album enjoyed chart success in the UK, peaking at number five. It peaked at number 49 in the US, improving on their debut album Queen, which peaked at number 83. In interviews the group promoted the album with a theme of "good versus evil," and made numerous public appearances to gain exposure: aside from touring in 1973, they performed BBC specials, broadcast a gig at Golders Green Hippodrome on In Concert and appeared on John Peel's Sound of the Seventies. However, despite the publicity, the group received negative reviews from the media, who criticised the band for being "excessive and self indulgent."

"Seven Seas of Rhye", along with the non-album B-side "See What a Fool I've Been", was released as a single sooner than planned due to a fortuitous circumstance. In February 1974, David Bowie was unable to appear on the show "Top of the Pops" to perform "Rebel Rebel", and a replacement act was urgently needed. Queen were booked for the show and lip-synched "Seven Seas of Rhye". EMI then rushed the single into release on 22 February, just five days after the television appearance was confirmed. It was the band's first hit single, peaking at number 10 in the UK charts.

=== 2011 re-issue ===
On 8 November 2010, record company Universal Music announced a remastered and expanded reissue of the album set for release in May 2011. This was as part of a new record deal between Queen and Universal Music, which meant Queen's association with EMI Records would come to an end after almost 40 years. All of Queen's studio albums were remastered and reissued in 2011.

== Reception ==
=== Contemporary critical reaction ===
Considering the abuse we've had lately, I'm surprised that the new album has done so well. I suppose it's basically that audiences like the band... we took so much trouble over that album, possibly too much, but when we finished we felt really proud. Immediately it got really bad reviews so I took it home to listen to again and thought "Christ, are they right?" But after hearing it a few weeks later I still like it. I think it's great. We'll stick by it.

— Roger Taylor on the critical reaction to Queen II.

Disc wrote, "The material, performance, recording and even artwork standards are very high." NME opined that the record showcased "all their power and drive, their writing talents, and every quality that makes them unique," while Sounds wrote, "Simply titled Queen II, this album captures them in their finest hours." Rolling Stone, who had highly praised the band's first album, awarded the album two-and-a-half stars out of five. While the magazine had little enthusiasm for "Side Black", they applauded "Side White", writing that it featured the "saving grace of timely and well-chosen power chords and some rather pretty tunes." Melody Maker wrote, "It's reputed Queen have enjoyed some success in the States, it's currently in the balance whether they'll really break through here. If they do, then I'll have to eat my hat or something. Maybe Queen try too hard, there's no depth of sound or feeling." Record Mirror wrote, "This is it, the dregs of glam rock. Weak and over-produced, if this band are our brightest hope for the future, then we are committing rock and roll suicide." Robert Christgau, writing in Creem magazine, derisively referred to it as "wimpoid royaloid heavyoid android void."

=== Legacy ===
Retrospective professional reviews
Review scores
Source	Rating
AllMusic	4/5 stars
Chicago Tribune	2/4 stars
Christgau's Record Guide	C−
Encyclopedia of Popular Music	4/5 stars
MusicHound Rock	2/5
Pitchfork	7.9/10
PopMatters	7/10
Q	4/5 stars
Record Collector	4/5 stars
The Rolling Stone Album Guide	2.5/5 stars

As 1974 drew to a close, public reaction to Queen II had been enthusiastic. The album was also ranked by Disc as the 5th best of the year. While the album remains one of the band's lesser-known works, it has since retained a cult following and has in recent years been cited by a number of music publications, fellow artists and fans as one of Queen's finest works. In 1987, the Post-Tribune ranked Queen II 9th in an article covering "albums that should be in everyone's record collection, but aren't." In the 1994 edition of The Guinness All Time Top 1000 Albums, Queen II was voted number 202 in the all-time greatest rock and pop albums. In 2003, Q magazine included Queen II in a list of fifty little-known albums recommended by the magazine to supplement their "The 50 Best British Albums Ever" poll. In 2005, Kerrang! readers voted Queen II the 72nd greatest British rock album ever. In 2006, the album was featured in Classic Rock and Metal Hammer's "The 200 Greatest Albums of the 70s," being listed alongside Sheer Heart Attack as one of the 20 greatest albums of 1974. In 2008, IGN named Queen II as one of their "10 Classic Glam Rock Albums", writing, "Queen gave glam a bigger, more anthemic sound with this glittery opus. Combined with Freddie Mercury's underrated keyboard work, Brian May's ringing leads and pristine riffs created a backdrop for songs that were by turns ferocious and elegant." In 2010, Mojo ranked Queen II as the 60th greatest album ever released on the Elektra label. Along with the Queen albums Sheer Heart Attack and A Night at the Opera, Queen II is featured in the book 1001 Albums You Must Hear Before You Die, where it is described as "a distinctly dark album" which "displayed their diversity," and contrasted with their later "expansive, stadium-pleasing anthems."

AllMusic awarded the album 4/5 stars and said, "Queen is coiled, tense, and vicious here, delivering on their inherent sense of drama, and that gives Queen II real power as music, as well as a true cohesion". The review observed the album's heaviness and stated "this never feels as fantastical as Genesis or Uriah Heep", concluding "Queen II is one of the favorites of their hardcore fans". Pitchfork awarded the album a very positive rating of 8/10, writing, "Dizzying, overstuffed, and unflinching, Queen II is a die-hard fan favorite, and arguably the band's most underrated record." In 2009, The Quietus published an article highlighting Queen's "lesser-known brilliance" to coincide with the release of that year's Absolute Greatest compilation, describing Queen II as "an absolute scorcher of an album" which features two of the band's best tracks: "Ogre Battle" and "Father to Son". In 2014, Brian Moore wrote for Houston Press that "the music is more progressive and the harmonies more advanced than anything from the first album. Queen had so exhausted themselves with the progressive rock style after recording this album that they abandoned the sound entirely for the next one." Writing for Classic Rock in 2016, Malcolm Dome ranked Queen II as the band's sixth greatest album. He wrote: "Stylistically there was nothing here that wasn't on the superior debut, and you can hear the band struggling with the traditional 'difficult second album' problems... They had pushed their rock and metal roots as far as they could, and were clearly looking to jump off the train and expand their horizons. It's probably for this reason that the album lacked the sparkle and bite of Queen and the audacity of the subsequent Sheer Heart Attack." Greg Kot of Chicago Tribune offered a plain favourable rating of 2 stars, commenting the album "fused Led Zeppelin's metallic stomp with Yes' baroque arrangements and topped it off with a dash of campiness."

Other rock musicians have praised the album. Rob Halford of Judas Priest cited Queen II as one of his favourite albums, saying it is "nothing but good songs" and stating "Ogre Battle" as a particular favourite. In a 1989 Rolling Stone interview, Guns N' Roses lead singer Axl Rose said of the album, "With Queen, I have my favorite: Queen II. Whenever their newest record would come out and have all these other kinds of music on it, at first I'd only like this song or that song. But after a period of time listening to it, it would open my mind up to so many different styles. I really appreciate them for that. That's something I've always wanted to be able to achieve". In 1992, Dee Snider of Twisted Sister declared "That album is one of the greatest albums of all time! It really has such DEPTH! You could spend years with it and not get all the nuances." Mötley Crüe bassist Nikki Sixx expressed his admiration for the album in 2005, saying "Queen II will knock your dick in the dirt every time". Smashing Pumpkins lead singer Billy Corgan spoke to Melody Maker in August 1993 about "the records which changed his life," stating, "I worked at this record store where we had lots of old records, and I found Queen II, probably their least popular album. It's so over the top, so many vocal and guitar track overdubs – total Queen overload. I loved it. I loved the cool, weird, ambiguous songs about Freddie's sexuality and the way it shifts from heavy to beautiful ballads."

=== Band appraisal ===
(On the concept of Side White and Side Black) Well... that was a concept that we developed at the time... it doesn't have any special meaning. But we were fascinated with these types of things... the wardrobe that we used at the time described it perfectly well...

— Freddie Mercury

The most important thing to me was the Queen II album going into the charts – especially satisfying that, since the first one didn't do so well. It's nice to see some recognition for your work though I don't usually worry too much. Roger tends to worry more about what's happening on that side.

— John Deacon

That's when we first really got into production, and went completely over the top.

— Roger Taylor

I hated the title of the second album, Queen II, it was so unimaginative.

— Roger Taylor

When Queen II came out it didn't connect with everyone. A lot of people thought we'd forsaken rock music. They said: "Why don't you play things like 'Liar' and 'Keep Yourself Alive?'" All we could say was, give it another listen, it's there, but it's all layered, it's a new approach. Nowadays people say: "Why don't you play like Queen II?" A lot of our close fans think that, and I still like that album a lot. It's not perfect, it has the imperfections of youth and the excesses of youth, but I think that was our biggest single step ever.

— Brian May

== Track listing ==
=== Original release ===
All lead vocals by Freddie Mercury unless noted. Roger Taylor was credited as Roger Meddows-Taylor, his full name, but that was discontinued after this album.

Side White

All tracks are written by Brian May, except "The Loser in the End" by Roger Taylor, and produced by Roy Thomas Baker and Queen.

No.	Title	Lead vocals	Length
1.	"Procession"	Instrumental	1:12
2.	"Father to Son"		6:14
3.	"White Queen (As It Began)"		4:34
4.	"Some Day One Day"	May	4:23
5.	"The Loser in the End"	Taylor	4:02

Side Black

All tracks are written by Freddie Mercury, and produced by Baker and Queen except where noted.

No.	Title	Producers	Length
1.	"Ogre Battle"		4:10
2.	"The Fairy Feller's Master-Stroke"		2:40
3.	"Nevermore"	Robin G. Cable; Queen	1:17
4.	"The March of the Black Queen" (vocals by Mercury with Taylor)	Baker; Cable; Queen	6:33
5.	"Funny How Love Is"	Cable; Queen	2:50
6.	"Seven Seas of Rhye"		2:50
Total length:			40:42

Bonus tracks (1991 Hollywood Records reissue)
No.	Title	Writer(s)	Length
12.	"See What a Fool I've Been" (B-side to "Seven Seas of Rhye")	May	4:32
13.	"Ogre Battle" (1991 Bonus Remix)	Mercury	3:27
14.	"Seven Seas of Rhye" (1991 Bonus Remix)	Mercury	6:35
Total length:			54:36

=== Universal Music reissue (2011) ===
Bonus EP
No.	Title	Length
1.	"See What a Fool I've Been" (BBC session, July 1973 - remix 2011)	4:22
2.	"White Queen (As It Began)" (live at Hammersmith Odeon, December 1975)	5:34
3.	"Seven Seas of Rhye" (instrumental mix 2011)	3:10
4.	"Nevermore" (BBC session, April 1974)	1:29
5.	"See What a Fool I've Been" (B-side version, February 1974)	4:31
Total length:		19:06

=== iTunes deluxe edition (2011) ===
Bonus videos
No.	Title	Length
1.	"White Queen (As It Began)" (live at The Rainbow '74)
2.	"Seven Seas of Rhye" (live at Wembley Stadium '86)
3.	"Ogre Battle" (live at Hammersmith Odeon '75)

== Personnel ==
Personnel taken from Queen II liner notes.

Queen

- Freddie Mercury – vocals, piano, harpsichord
- Brian May – guitars, vocals, piano, bells
- John Deacon – bass guitar, acoustic guitar
- Roger Taylor (credited as Roger Meddows-Taylor) – drums, percussion, vocals

Additional personnel

- Roy Thomas Baker – production, castanets ("The Fairy Feller's Master-Stroke"), stylophone ( "Seven Seas of Rhye")
- Queen – production, additional production
- Robin Geoffrey Cable – additional production
- Mike Stone – engineering

Visual

- Mick Rock – photography, art direction, sleeve concept
- Queen – sleeve concept
- Ridgeway Watt – typography

== 2026 box set reissue ==
Queen II Collector's Edition

Box set by Queen
- Released: 27 March 2026
- Recorded: September – October 1969; April 1973 – April 1974; November 1974; 24 December 1975
- Venues: Golders Green Hippodrome, London; Rainbow Theatre, London; Hammersmith Odeon, London
- Studios: Trident, London
- Genres: Art rock; hard rock; glam rock; heavy metal; progressive rock

Queen chronology
Queen I Collector's Edition (2024)	Queen II Collector's Edition (2026)

Singles from Queen II Collector's Edition
- 1. "Seven Seas of Rhye (2026 Mix)" Released: 27 February 2026

A remixed, remastered and expanded edition of Queen II, Queen II Collector's Edition, was released on 27 March 2026. The album was previously announced by May soon after the release of Queen I Collector's Edition. It contains a previously unreleased Queen version of "Not for Sale (Polar Bear)", originally recorded by May and Taylor's band Smile. The first single, the 2026 mix of "Seven Seas of Rhye", was released on 27 February 2026.

=== Songs ===
==== "Not for Sale (Polar Bear)" ====
Written by May, the song was recorded by Smile in September 1969 at De Lane Lea Studios under the title "Polar Bear". Although not released at the time, the track later appeared on Smile's compilation albums Gettin’ Smile (LP) and Ghost of a Smile (CD). During the Queen II sessions, Queen re-recorded the song, but it was never completed. The second take of the Queen recording later leaked and had been circulating in bootleg form since. Decades later, the track was revisited, with Producer Kris Fredriksson noting that advances in studio technology now allowed them to complete it in ways that had not been possible previously. The finished Queen version was unveiled by May on a special Christmas Planet Rock radio show on 22 December 2025. This version is a hybrid of May’s vocals from the Smile recording and Mercury’s vocals from the Queen sessions, along with a newly recorded vocal line by May.

=== Track listing ===
Queen II Sessions
No.	Title	Writer(s)	Lead vocals	Length
1.	"Procession" (Stage Intro Tape - April 1973)	Brian May	Instrumental	2:04
2.	"Father to Son" (Takes 4 & 9 - with Guide Vocal)	May		7:30
3.	"As It Began" (Brian's Studio Demo - October 1969)	May		2:13
4.	"Some Day One Day" (Take 1 - with Guide Vocals)	May		5:03
5.	"The Loser in the End" (Roger's First Demo)	Roger Taylor		1:07
6.	"The Loser in the End" (Roger's Second Demo)	Taylor		2:02
7.	"Ogre Battle" (Takes 2 & 6 - with Guide Vocal)	Freddie Mercury		5:25
8.	"The Fairy Feller's Master-Stroke" (Takes 4 & 9)	Mercury		4:13
9.	"Nevermore" (Take 6)	Mercury		2:43
10.	"The March of the Black Queen" (First Section Takes 3 & 5)	Mercury		4:41
11.	"The March of the Black Queen" (Second Section Take 1)	Mercury		3:59
12.	"Funny How Love Is" (Take 4)	Mercury		3:59
13.	"Seven Seas of Rhye" (Takes 4, 5 & 6)	Mercury		5:12
14.	"I Do Like to Be Beside the Seaside" (Take 4)	John H. Glover-Kind		0:45
15.	"See What a Fool I've Been" (B-side Version - 2026 Mix)	May		4:31
16.	"Not for Sale (Polar Bear)"	May		3:55

Queen II Backing Tracks
No.	Title	Writer(s)	Length
1.	"Procession" (2026 Mix)	May	1:13
2.	"Father to Son" (Backing Track)	May	6:13
3.	"White Queen (As It Began)" (Backing Track)	May	4:35
4.	"Some Day One Day" (Backing Track)	May	4:22
5.	"The Loser in the End" (Instrumental)	Taylor	4:06
6.	"Ogre Battle" (Backing Track)	Mercury	4:07
7.	"The Fairy Feller's Master-Stroke" (Instrumental)	Mercury	2:41
8.	"Nevermore" (Backing Track)	Mercury	1:19
9.	"The March of the Black Queen" (Backing Track)	Mercury	6:32
10.	"Funny How Love Is" (Backing Track)	Mercury	2:51
11.	"Seven Seas of Rhye" (Backing Track)	Mercury	2:52

Queen II at the BBC
No.	Title	Writer(s)	Length
1.	"See What a Fool I've Been" (BBC Session 2, July 1973 - 2011 Mix)	May	4:28
2.	"Ogre Battle" (BBC Session 3, December 1973)	Mercury	4:48
3.	"Nevermore" (BBC Session 4, April 1974)	Mercury	1:30
4.	"White Queen (As It Began)" (BBC Session 4, April 1974)	May	4:57
5.	"Procession" (Intro Tape/ Live at Golders Green Hippodrome, 13th September 1973)	May	1:40
6.	"Father to Son" (Live at Golders Green Hippodrome, 13th September 1973)	May	5:29
7.	"Son and Daughter" (Live at Golders Green Hippodrome, 13th September 1973)	May	3:44
8.	"Guitar Solo" (Live at Golders Green Hippodrome, 13th September 1973)	May	1:25
9.	"Son and Daughter" (Reprise/ Live at Golders Green Hippodrome, 13th September 1973)	Mercury	2:08
10.	"Ogre Battle" (Live at Golders Green Hippodrome, 13th September 1973)	Mercury	5:22
11.	"Liar" (Live at Golders Green Hippodrome, 13th September 1973)	Mercury	7:26
12.	"Jailhouse Rock" (Live at Golders Green Hippodrome, 13th September 1973)	Jerry Leiber, Mike Stoller	1:12

Queen II - Live
No.	Title	Writer(s)	Length
1.	"Procession" (Intro Tape/ Live at the Rainbow, 31 March 1974)	May	1:13
2.	"Father to Son" (Live at the Rainbow, 31 March 1974)	May	6:06
3.	"Ogre Battle" (Live at the Rainbow, 31 March 1974)	Mercury	4:58
4.	"White Queen (As It Began)" (Live at the Hammersmith Odeon, 24 December 1975)	May	5:24
5.	"The March of the Black Queen" (Live at the Rainbow, November 1974)	Mercury	1:37
6.	"The Fairy Feller's Master-Stroke" (Live at the Rainbow, 31 March 1974)	Mercury	2:57
7.	"Seven Seas of Rhye" (Live at the Rainbow, 31 March 1974)	Mercury	3:14
8.	"See What a Fool I've Been" (Live at the Rainbow, 31 March 1974)	May	5:03

== Charts ==
Chart (1974)	Peak position
Australian Albums (Kent Music Report)	79
Canada Top Albums/CDs (RPM)	40
Japanese Albums (Oricon)	26
Norwegian Albums (VG-lista)	19
UK Albums (Official Charts)	5
US Billboard 200	49

Chart (2026)	Peak position
Austrian Albums (Ö3 Austria)	7
Belgian Albums (Ultratop Flanders)	13
Belgian Albums (Ultratop Wallonia)	10
Croatian International Albums (HDU)	6
Dutch Albums (Album Top 100)	10
German Albums (Offizielle Top 100)	7
German Rock & Metal Albums (Offizielle Top 100)	3
Greek Albums (IFPI)	37
Hungarian Physical Albums (MAHASZ)	30
Italian Albums (FIMI)	26
Polish Albums (ZPAV)	45
Swiss Albums (Schweizer Hitparade)	21

UK album chart 14

== Certifications ==
Region	Certification	Certified units/sales
Canada (Music Canada)	Platinum	100,000^{^}
Japan (RIAJ)	Gold	100,000^{^}
Poland (ZPAV) 2009 Agora SA album reissue	Platinum	20,000^{*}
United Kingdom (BPI)	Gold	100,000^{^}
^{*} Sales figures based on certification alone.^{^} Shipments figures based on certification alone.
