= Bohemian Rhapsody (soundtrack) =

Soundtrack from the 2018 film, Bohemian Rhapsody

Bohemian Rhapsody: The Original Soundtrack

Soundtrack album by Queen
- Released: 19 October 2018
- Recorded: 1969–2018
- Studio: Various
- Genre: Rock
- Length: 79:44
- Labels: Hollywood; Virgin EMI
- Producer: Various

Queen chronology
On Air (2016)	Bohemian Rhapsody: The Original Soundtrack (2018)	Greatest Hits in Japan (2020)

Professional ratings
Aggregate scores
Source	Rating
Metacritic	70/100
Review scores
Source	Rating
AllMusic	4/5 stars
Classic Rock	4.5/5 stars
Pitchfork	4.5/10
Rolling Stone	3.5/5 stars

Bohemian Rhapsody: The Original Soundtrack is the soundtrack album to the Queen biographical film of the same name. The soundtrack features many of the band's songs and unreleased recordings, including tracks from their legendary concert at Live Aid in 1985. The soundtrack was released by Hollywood Records and Virgin EMI Records on 19 October 2018, on CD, cassette and digital formats. The soundtrack was later released on 8 February 2019, as a vinyl double album specially cut at Abbey Road Studios. A limited and much sought-after double picture disc edition of the album, as well as a 7" coloured single featuring the original "Bohemian Rhapsody"/"I'm in Love with My Car" pairing, was also released on Record Store Day, 13 April 2019. The disc artwork takes its inspiration from the photography of Denis O'Regan. In November 2019, the soundtrack received an American Music Award for Top Soundtrack.

== Background ==
The official soundtrack album contains several Queen hits and 11 previously unreleased recordings, including five tracks from their 21-minute Live Aid performance in July 1985 previously unreleased in audio form. The set was issued on CD, cassette, and digital formats on 19 October 2018, and was later released on heavyweight vinyl on 8 February 2019. Hollywood Records released the album in the United States and Canada, while Virgin EMI Records handled the global release.

== Commercial performance ==
Globally, the soundtrack held a top 10 position in 25 album charts during 2018/19 (a total of 45 weeks in the UK top 10), becoming one of Queen's top-selling albums in over 40 years. It became their second Australian number one album after A Night at the Opera in 1976. It initially debuted at number 22 on the US Billboard 200 with 24,000 album-equivalent units, which included 12,000 pure album sales. It served as Queen's 17th top 40 album in the United States. In its second week, the soundtrack climbed to number 3 on both the Billboard 200 and the official UK Albums Chart, while Queen's The Platinum Collection entered the top 10 of the Billboard 200 in the same week, making it the first time Queen have had two albums in the US top 10 at the same time. It peaked at number 2 on the Billboard 200 in its 18th week, becoming Queen's second-highest-charting album in the country. It was the 6th best-selling album in the 2019 UK end of year charts. The soundtrack has been certified platinum in several countries including the UK, Australia, and Japan.

== Accolades ==
In November 2019, the Bohemian Rhapsody soundtrack won Favourite Soundtrack at the American Music Awards.

== Track listing ==
Credits adapted from the liner notes.

No.	Title	Writer(s)	Originally Taken From	Length
1.	"20th Century Fox Fanfare"	Alfred Newman, Arr; Brian May		0:25
2.	"Somebody to Love"	Freddie Mercury	A Day at the Races (1976)	4:56
3.	"Doing All Right... Revisited" (Performed by Smile)	May, Tim Staffell	Queen version appears on Queen (1973)	3:17
4.	"Keep Yourself Alive" (Live at the Rainbow Theatre, London, Sunday 31 March 1974)	May	Live at the Rainbow '74 (2014). Studio version appears on Queen (1973)	3:56
5.	"Killer Queen"	Mercury	Sheer Heart Attack (1974)	2:59
6.	"Fat Bottomed Girls" (Live at Pavillon de Paris, France, Tuesday 27 February 1979)	May	Studio version appears on Jazz (1978)	4:38
7.	"Bohemian Rhapsody"	Mercury	A Night at the Opera (1975)	5:55
8.	"Now I'm Here" (Live at Hammersmith Odeon, London, Wednesday 24 December 1975)	May	A Night at the Odeon - Hammersmith 1975 (2015). Studio version appears on Sheer Heart Attack (1974)	4:26
9.	"Crazy Little Thing Called Love"	Mercury	The Game (1980)	2:43
10.	"Love of My Life" (Live at Rock in Rio Festival, Saturday 19 January 1985)	Mercury	Studio version appears on A Night at the Opera (1975)	4:29
11.	"We Will Rock You" (Movie Mix)	May	Original version appears on News of the World (1977)	2:09
12.	"Another One Bites the Dust"	John Deacon	The Game (1980)	3:35
13.	"I Want to Break Free" (Single Remix/Soundtrack Edit)	Deacon	The Works (1984)	3:43
14.	"Under Pressure" (Featuring David Bowie)	Queen; David Bowie	Hot Space (1982)	4:04
15.	"Who Wants to Live Forever"	May	A Kind of Magic (1986)	5:15
16.	"Bohemian Rhapsody (Reprise)" (Live Aid, Wembley Stadium, London, Saturday 13 July 1985)	Mercury	Studio version appears on A Night at the Opera (1975)	2:28
17.	"Radio Ga Ga" (Live Aid)	Roger Taylor	Studio version appears on The Works (1984)	4:06
18.	"Ay-Oh" (Live Aid)	Mercury	Previously released on Queen Rock Montreal & Live Aid	0:41
19.	"Hammer to Fall" (Live Aid)	May	Studio version appears on The Works (1984)	4:04
20.	"We Are the Champions" (Live Aid)	Mercury	Studio version appears on News of the World (1977)	3:57
21.	"Don't Stop Me Now... Revisited"	Mercury	Original version appears on Jazz (1978)	3:38
22.	"The Show Must Go On"	Queen (May)	Innuendo (1991)	4:32
Total length:				79:44

== Personnel ==
Queen

- John Deacon – bass guitar (2, 4–22), guitars (12, 13), piano (12), synthesizer (13)
- Brian May – guitars, vocals (all tracks), synthesizers (15, 22), orchestral arrangements (15)
- Freddie Mercury – piano, vocals (2, 4–22), guitar (9), organ (14)
- Roger Taylor – drums, vocals (all tracks)

Additional musicians

- Tim Staffell – vocals, bass guitar (3)
- David Bowie – vocals, synthesizer (14)
- Spike Edney – keyboards, background vocals (16–20)
- Michael Kamen – orchestral arrangements (15)
- Fred Mandel – synthesizer (13)
- National Philharmonic Orchestra – strings, brass and percussion (15)

== Charts ==
=== Weekly charts ===
Chart (2018–2021)	Peak position
Australian Albums (ARIA)	1
Austrian Albums (Ö3 Austria)	6
Belgian Albums (Ultratop Flanders)	5
Belgian Albums (Ultratop Wallonia)	3
Canadian Albums (Billboard)	3
Czech Albums (ČNS IFPI)	1
Danish Albums (Hitlisten)	11
Dutch Albums (Album Top 100)	4
Finnish Albums (Suomen virallinen lista)	19
French Albums (SNEP)	7
German Albums (Offizielle Top 100)	8
Greek Albums (IFPI)	1
Hungarian Albums (MAHASZ)	10
Irish Albums (IRMA)	2
Italian Albums (FIMI)	3
Japanese Combined Albums (Oricon)	1
Lithuanian Albums (AGATA)	2
Mexican Albums (AMPROFON)	1
New Zealand Albums (RMNZ)	2
Norwegian Albums (VG-lista)	14
Polish Albums (ZPAV)	4
Portuguese Albums (AFP)	3
Scottish Albums (Official Charts)	4
South Korean Albums (Gaon)	8
Spanish Albums (PROMUSICAE)	2
Swedish Albums (Sverigetopplistan)	21
Swiss Albums (Schweizer Hitparade)	2
UK Albums (Official Charts)	3
US Billboard 200	2
US Top Rock Albums (Billboard)	1
US Soundtrack Albums (Billboard)	1

=== Year-end charts ===
Chart (2018)	Position
Australian Albums (ARIA)	5
Austrian Albums (Ö3 Austria)	51
Belgian Albums (Ultratop Flanders)	43
Belgian Albums (Ultratop Wallonia)	29
Dutch Albums (MegaCharts)	68
French Albums (SNEP)	70
Irish Albums (IRMA)	15
Italian Albums (FIMI)	59
Japanese Albums (Oricon)	36
South Korean International Albums (Gaon)	1
Mexican Albums (AMPROFON)	10
New Zealand Albums (RMNZ)	30
Polish Albums (ZPAV)	39
Spanish Albums (PROMUSICAE)	26
Swiss Albums (Schweizer Hitparade)	53
UK Albums (OCC)	13
US Top Rock Albums (Billboard)	62
US Soundtrack Albums (Billboard)	25
Chart (2019)	Position
Australian Albums (ARIA)	5
Austrian Albums (Ö3 Austria)	43
Belgian Albums (Ultratop Flanders)	25
Belgian Albums (Ultratop Wallonia)	12
Canadian Albums (Billboard)	11
Danish Albums (Hitlisten)	57
Dutch Albums (Album Top 100)	15
French Albums (SNEP)	26
German Albums (Offizielle Top 100)	55
Icelandic Albums (Plötutíóindi)	57
Irish Albums (IRMA)	8
Italian Albums (FIMI)	10
Japanese Albums (Oricon)	10
Mexican Albums (AMPROFON)	1
New Zealand Albums (RMNZ)	4
Polish Albums (ZPAV)	40
Spanish Albums (PROMUSICAE)	6
Swiss Albums (Schweizer Hitparade)	6
UK Albums (OCC)	6
US Billboard 200	12
US Top Rock Albums (Billboard)	1
US Soundtrack Albums (Billboard)	2
Worldwide Albums (IFPI)	6
Chart (2020)	Position
Australian Albums (ARIA)	26
Belgian Albums (Ultratop Flanders)	142
Belgian Albums (Ultratop Wallonia)	90
French Albums (SNEP)	106
New Zealand Albums (RMNZ)	19
Spanish Albums (PROMUSICAE)	60
US Top Rock Albums (Billboard)	54
US Soundtrack Albums (Billboard)	10
Chart (2021)	Position
Australian Albums (ARIA)	32
Belgian Albums (Ultratop Flanders)	117
Belgian Albums (Ultratop Wallonia)	60
French Albums (SNEP)	114
New Zealand Albums (RMNZ)	43
Polish Albums (ZPAV)	24
Spanish Albums (PROMUSICAE)	84
Chart (2022)	Position
Australian Albums (ARIA)	35
Belgian Albums (Ultratop Flanders)	112
Belgian Albums (Ultratop Wallonia)	80
Polish Albums (ZPAV)	45
Chart (2023)	Position
Australian Albums (ARIA)	43
Belgian Albums (Ultratop Flanders)	194
Belgian Albums (Ultratop Wallonia)	151
Chart (2024)	Position
Australian Albums (ARIA)	41
Chart (2025)	Position
Australian Albums (ARIA)	88

=== Decade-end charts ===
Chart (2010–2019)	Position
Australian Albums (ARIA)	76
US Billboard 200	90

== Certifications ==
Region	Certification	Certified units/sales
Australia (ARIA)	2× Platinum	140,000^{‡}
Austria (IFPI Austria)	Platinum	15,000^{‡}
Belgium (BRMA)	Gold	10,000^{‡}
Canada (Music Canada)	Gold	40,000^{‡}
Denmark (IFPI Danmark)	Platinum	20,000^{‡}
France (SNEP)	3× Platinum	300,000^{‡}
Italy (FIMI)	3× Platinum	150,000^{‡}
Japan (RIAJ)	Platinum	250,000^{^}
New Zealand (RMNZ)	4× Platinum	60,000^{‡}
Poland (ZPAV)	2× Platinum	40,000^{‡}
Portugal (AFP)	Gold	3,500^{‡}
South Korea (Gaon Chart)	—	40,849
Spain (Promusicae)	Platinum	40,000^{‡}
United Kingdom (BPI)	2× Platinum	600,000^{‡}
United States (RIAA)	Gold	500,000^{‡}
^{^} Shipments figures based on certification alone.^{‡} Sales+streaming figures based on certification alone.
