= Greatest Hits in Japan =

2020 greatest hits album by Queen

Compilation album by Queen
- Released: 15 January 2020
- Recorded: 1973–1991
- Studio: Various
- Genre: Rock
- Length: 54:55
- Label: Universal Music Japan
- Producer: Brian May; Roger Taylor

Queen chronology
Bohemian Rhapsody: The Original Soundtrack (2018)	Greatest Hits in Japan (2020)	The Miracle Collector's Edition (2022)

Greatest Hits in Japan is a compilation album by British rock band Queen. It was released on 15 January 2020 by Universal Music Group. The album was only released in Japan as a limited edition release.

== Background ==
As part of their "Rhapsody Tour", Queen + Adam Lambert returned to Japan in January 2020. To mark the occasion, a compilation album was released, featuring twelve Queen songs voted for by Japanese fans.

The voting took place through an online form via a special section on Queen's official Japanese website from 6 to 25 November 2019, where, as a general rule, fans residing in the country were invited to cast their votes for their favourite song by Queen from their 15 original studio albums under the one-person-one-vote principle. All participants were required to choose only one song to vote for from the list of 172 tracks in total.

In total there were 11,988 voters. The CD version of the album was exclusive to Japan, while the digital version was available worldwide. The limited-edition CD also included a DVD including music videos of the 12 songs on the album.

== Track listing ==
All lead vocals by Freddie Mercury, except "'39" sung by Brian May.

Greatest Hits in Japan track listing
No.	Title	Writer(s)	Original Album	Length
1.	"Somebody to Love"	Freddie Mercury	A Day at the Races, 1976	4:56
2.	"Don't Stop Me Now"	Mercury	Jazz, 1978	3:29
3.	"Teo Torriatte (Let Us Cling Together)"	Brian May	A Day at the Races	5:55
4.	"Spread Your Wings"	John Deacon	News of the World, 1977	4:34
5.	"Killer Queen"	Mercury	Sheer Heart Attack, 1974	2:59
6.	"The Show Must Go On"	May	Innuendo, 1991	4:32
7.	"Bohemian Rhapsody"	Mercury	A Night at the Opera, 1975	5:55
8.	"'39"	May	A Night at the Opera	3:30
9.	"The March of the Black Queen"	Mercury	Queen II, 1974	6:39
10.	"Good Old-Fashioned Lover Boy"	Mercury	A Day at the Races	2:53
11.	"Keep Yourself Alive"	May	Queen, 1973	3:46
12.	"Radio Ga Ga"	Roger Taylor	The Works, 1984	5:47
Total length:				54:55

== Personnel ==
Queen

- Freddie Mercury – piano, synthesizer (12), vocals (all tracks)
- Brian May – guitar, piano (3), bells (9), keyboards (6), vocals (all but 4)
- Roger Taylor – drums, synthesizer (12), vocals (all but 4)
- John Deacon – bass guitar, acoustic guitar (4), double bass (8)

Additional musicians

- Mike Stone – vocals on "Good Old-Fashioned Lover Boy"
- Fred Mandel – synthesizer on "Radio Ga Ga"

== Charts ==
Chart performance for Greatest Hits in Japan
Chart (2020–21)	Peak position
French Albums (SNEP)	129
Japanese Albums (Oricon)	7
