= Queen Live at Golders Green Hippodrome =

Queen Will Be Crowned

Live album bootleg by Queen
- Recorded: 13 September 1973
- Genre: Rock
- Length: 39:49
- Label: Digital Queen Archives

Queen Live at Golders Green Hippodrome is a live performance of the band Queen which was recorded at the Golders Green Hippodrome in London on 13 September 1973, during the Queen I Tour and broadcast on BBC Radio 1 as part of its In Concert series on 20 October 1973.

There are several bootleg soundboard recordings of this broadcast known variously as Live at Golders Green Hippodrome 1973 and Queen Will Be Crowned. Some of the songs of this broadcast have been released by the band in the virtual albums Cry Argentina and Rogues & Scandals, part of the official Top 100 Bootlegs series. Most of the concert was released as part of the 6-CD deluxe edition of Queen's compilation album, On Air.

== Tracks ==
1. Introduction/Procession (Brian May) - 1:33
2. Father to Son (May) - 5:24
3. Son and Daughter (May) - 7:06
4. See What a Fool I've been (May) - 4:40
5. Ogre Battle (Freddie Mercury) - 4:38
6. Band Introduction - 0:36
7. Liar (Mercury) - 7:19
8. Jailhouse Rock/Shake, Rattle and Roll/Stupid Cupid/Be-Bop-A-Lula/Jailhouse Rock (Reprise) (Jerry Leiber, Mike Stoller, Howard Greenfield, Neil Sedaka, Gene Vincent, Donald Graves, Jesse Stone) - 3:47
9. Big Spender/Bama Lama Bama Loo (Cy Coleman, Dorothy Fields, Richard Penniman) - 3:16

== Trivia ==
- During the band introduction John Deacon is referred to as Deacon John, same as on the Queen album sleeve
- This is the earliest known soundboard recording of Queen
