= On Air (Queen album) =

Compilation album by Queen
- Released: 4 November 2016
- Genres: Rock, hard rock
- Length: 100:52 (2CD Edition); 398:28 (6CD Deluxe Edition)
- Labels: Virgin EMI; Hollywood
- Producers: Justin Shirley-Smith; Josh Macrae; Kris Fredriksson

Queen chronology
A Night at the Odeon – Hammersmith 1975 (2015)	On Air (2016)	Bohemian Rhapsody: The Original Soundtrack (2018)

On Air is a compilation album by the British rock band Queen. It was released in November 2016 in a two-disc CD format, a six-disc deluxe CD format, and a 3LP vinyl release.

== Overview ==
The two-disc set features the complete BBC studio sessions; the six-disc edition adds a disc featuring several songs from three live concerts spanning between 1973 and 1986 and three discs featuring various interviews broadcast on Capital Radio and BBC Radio 1.

14 of the 24 BBC sessions tracks have been previously released:

- 8 tracks have been released on Queen previous BBC album, At the Beeb
- "See What a Fool I've Been" and "Nevermore" are from Queen II 2011 reissue
- "Flick Of The Wrist" and "Tenement Funster" are from Sheer Heart Attack 2011 reissue
- "Spread Your Wings" and "My Melancholy Blues" are from News of the World 2011 reissue

BBC sessions tracks from News of the World, Queen and Queen II were later included on box set reissues of the respective albums in 2017, 2024 and 2026.

== Track listing ==
=== 2-disc edition: The Complete BBC Sessions ===
Disc one
No.	Title	Writer(s)	Length
1.	"My Fairy King" (Session 1: 5 February 1973)	Freddie Mercury	4:08
2.	"Keep Yourself Alive" (Session 1: 5 February 1973)	Brian May	3:49
3.	"Doing All Right" (Session 1: 5 February 1973)	May; Tim Staffell	4:13
4.	"Liar" (Session 1: 5 February 1973)	Mercury	6:30
5.	"See What a Fool I've Been" (Session 2: 25 July 1973)	May	4:21
6.	"Keep Yourself Alive" (Session 2: 25 July 1973)	May	3:50
7.	"Liar" (Session 2: 25 July 1973)	Mercury	6:29
8.	"Son and Daughter" (Session 2: 25 July 1973)	May	6:03
9.	"Ogre Battle" (Session 3: 3 December 1973)	Mercury	4:40
10.	"Modern Times Rock 'N' Roll" (Session 3: 3 December 1973)	Roger Taylor	2:02
11.	"Great King Rat" (Session 3: 3 December 1973)	Mercury	5:57
12.	"Son and Daughter" (Session 3: 3 December 1973)	May	7:08
Total length:			59:10

Disc two
No.	Title	Writer(s)	Length
1.	"Modern Times Rock 'N' Roll" (Session 4: 3 April 1974)	Taylor	2:46
2.	"Nevermore" (Session 4: 3 April 1974)	Mercury	1:29
3.	"White Queen (As It Began)" (Session 4: 3 April 1974)	May	4:54
4.	"Now I'm Here" (Session 5: 16 October 1974)	May	4:18
5.	"Stone Cold Crazy" (Session 5: 16 October 1974)	Mercury; May; Taylor; John Deacon	2:17
6.	"Flick of the Wrist" (Session 5: 16 October 1974)	Mercury	3:26
7.	"Tenement Funster" (Session 5: 16 October 1974)	Taylor	3:00
8.	"We Will Rock You" (Session 6: 28 October 1977)	May	1:35
9.	"We Will Rock You (Fast)" (Session 6: 28 October 1977)	May	2:46
10.	"Spread Your Wings" (Session 6: 28 October 1977)	Deacon	5:24
11.	"It's Late" (Session 6: 28 October 1977)	May	6:36
12.	"My Melancholy Blues" (Session 6: 28 October 1977)	Mercury	3:11
Total length:			41:42

=== 6CD Deluxe Edition ===
Note: Even though discs one and two have the same track listing as the two-disc version, here, they feature DJ chatter after songs which is omitted in the two-disc format.

Disc one: The BBC Sessions
No.	Title	Writer(s)	Length
1.	"My Fairy King" (Session 1: 5 February 1973)	Mercury	4:17
2.	"Keep Yourself Alive" (Session 1: 5 February 1973)	May	3:53
3.	"Doing All Right" (Session 1: 5 February 1973)	May; Staffell	4:17
4.	"Liar" (Session 1: 5 February 1973)	Mercury	6:38
5.	"See What a Fool I've Been" (Session 2: 25 July 1973)	May	4:28
6.	"Keep Yourself Alive" (Session 2: 25 July 1973)	May	3:56
7.	"Liar" (Session 2: 25 July 1973)	Mercury	6:37
8.	"Son and Daughter" (Session 2: 25 July 1973)	May	6:14
9.	"Ogre Battle" (Session 3: 3 December 1973)	Mercury	4:48
10.	"Modern Times Rock 'N' Roll" (Session 3: 3 December 1973)	Taylor	2:06
11.	"Great King Rat" (Session 3: 3 December 1973)	Mercury	5:57
12.	"Son and Daughter" (Session 3: 3 December 1973)	May	7:17
Total length:			1:00:28

Disc two
No.	Title	Writer(s)	Length
1.	"Modern Times Rock 'N' Roll" (Session 4: 3 April 1974)	Taylor	2:53
2.	"Nevermore" (Session 4: 3 April 1974)	Mercury	1:30
3.	"White Queen (As It Began)" (Session 4: 3 April 1974)	May	5:00
4.	"Now I'm Here" (Session 5: 16 October 1974)	May	4:25
5.	"Stone Cold Crazy" (Session 5: 16 October 1974)	Mercury; May; Taylor; Deacon	2:18
6.	"Flick of the Wrist" (Session 5: 16 October 1974)	Mercury	3:31
7.	"Tenement Funster" (Session 5: 16 October 1974)	Taylor	3:16
8.	"We Will Rock You" (Session 6: 28 October 1977)	May	1:35
9.	"We Will Rock You (Fast)" (Session 6: 28 October 1977)	May	2:51
10.	"Spread Your Wings" (Session 6: 28 October 1977)	Deacon	5:32
11.	"It's Late" (Session 6: 28 October 1977)	May	6:37
12.	"My Melancholy Blues" (Session 6: 28 October 1977)	Mercury	3:15
Total length:			42:43

Disc three: Queen Live on Air
No.	Title	Writer(s)	Length
1.	"Procession" (Golders Green Hippodrome, London, England, 13 September 1973)	May	1:41
2.	"Father to Son" (Golders Green Hippodrome, London, England, 13 September 1973)	May	5:29
3.	"Son and Daughter" (Golders Green Hippodrome, London, England, 13 September 1973)	May	3:44
4.	"Guitar Solo" (Golders Green Hippodrome, London, England, 13 September 1973)	May	1:25
5.	"Son and Daughter (Reprise)" (Golders Green Hippodrome, London, England, 13 September 1973)	May	2:08
6.	"Ogre Battle" (Golders Green Hippodrome, London, England, 13 September 1973)	Mercury	5:22
7.	"Liar" (Golders Green Hippodrome, London, England, 13 September 1973)	Mercury	7:27
8.	"Jailhouse Rock" (Golders Green Hippodrome, London, England, 13 September 1973)	Jerry Leiber; Mike Stoller	1:07
9.	"Intro" (Estádio do Morumbi, São Paulo, Brazil, 20 March 1981)	Taylor	0:26
10.	"We Will Rock You (fast)" (Estádio do Morumbi, São Paulo, Brazil, 20 March 1981)	May	3:02
11.	"Let Me Entertain You" (Estádio do Morumbi, São Paulo, Brazil, 20 March 1981)	Mercury	3:26
12.	"I'm in Love With My Car" (Estádio do Morumbi, São Paulo, Brazil, 20 March 1981)	Taylor	2:09
13.	"Alright Alright" (Estádio do Morumbi, São Paulo, Brazil, 20 March 1981)	Mercury; May; Taylor; Deacon	2:39
14.	"Dragon Attack" (Estádio do Morumbi, São Paulo, Brazil, 20 March 1981)	May	3:27
15.	"Now I'm Here (Reprise)" (Estádio do Morumbi, São Paulo, Brazil, 20 March 1981)	May	1:50
16.	"Love of My Life" (Estádio do Morumbi, São Paulo, Brazil, 20 March 1981)	Mercury	4:39
17.	"A Kind of Magic" (Maimarktgelände, Mannheim, Germany, 21 June 1986)	Taylor	6:25
18.	"Vocal Improvisation" (Maimarktgelände, Mannheim, Germany, 21 June 1986)	Mercury	1:03
19.	"Under Pressure" (Maimarktgelände, Mannheim, Germany, 21 June 1986)	Taylor; Mercury; David Bowie; Deacon; May	3:38
20.	"Is This the World We Created...?" (Maimarktgelände, Mannheim, Germany, 21 June 1986)	Mercury; May	2:49
21.	"(You're So Square) Baby I Don't Care" (Maimarktgelände, Mannheim, Germany, 21 June 1986)	Leiber; Stoller	1:27
22.	"Hello Mary Lou (Goodbye Heart)" (Maimarktgelände, Mannheim, Germany, 21 June 1986)	Gene Pitney; Cayet Mangiaracina	1:39
23.	"Crazy Little Thing Called Love" (Maimarktgelände, Mannheim, Germany, 21 June 1986)	Mercury	4:55
24.	"God Save the Queen" (Maimarktgelände, Mannheim, Germany, 21 June 1986)	Traditional (arr. May)	1:21
Total length:			1:13:18

Disc four: Queen on Air: The Interviews (1976–1980)
No.	Title	Length
1.	"Freddie with Kenny Everett, ‘A Day at the Races’ album, November 1976" (Broadcast on Capital Radio)	15:57
2.	"Queen Interview with Tom Browne, ‘News of the World’ album, Christmas 1977" (Broadcast on BBC Radio 1)	40:34
3.	"Roger with Richard Skinner, ‘Live Killers’ album, June 1979" (Broadcast on BBC Radio 1)	4:32
4.	"Roger with Tommy Vance, ‘Flash Gordon’ album and film, December 1980" (Broadcast on BBC Radio 1)	5:53
5.	"Roy Thomas Baker ‘The Record Producers’" (Broadcast on BBC Radio 1)	10:36
Total length:		1:17:32

Disc five: Queen on Air: The Interviews (1980–1986)
No.	Title	Length
1.	"John interview, South American tour, March 1981" (Broadcast on BBC Radio 1)	2:26
2.	"Brian on ‘Rock On’ with John Tobler, ‘Hot Space’ album, June 1982" (Broadcast on BBC Radio 1)	11:08
3.	"Brian on ‘Saturday Live’ with Richard Skinner and Andy Foster, ‘The Works’ album, March 1984" (Broadcast on BBC Radio 1)	11:46
4.	"Freddie on ‘Newsbeat’, The Works Tour, August 1984" (Broadcast on BBC Radio 1)	2:34
5.	"Brian on ‘Newsbeat’, ‘The Works’ album, September 1984" (Broadcast on BBC Radio 1)	2:47
6.	"Freddie on ‘Saturday Live’ with Graham Neale, ‘The Works’ album, September 1984" (Broadcast on BBC Radio 1)	5:14
7.	"Freddie with Simon Bates, April 1985" (Broadcast on BBC Radio 1)	28:51
8.	"Brian on ‘The Way It Is’ with David ‘Kid’ Jensen. Wembley Stadium, London, July 1986" (Broadcast on Capital Radio)	4:39
Total length:		1:09:25

Disc six: Queen on Air: The Interviews (1986–1992)
No.	Title	Length
1.	"Roger interview, ‘My Top Ten’ with Andy Peebles, May 1986" (Broadcast on BBC Radio 1)	24:46
2.	"‘Queen for an Hour’ interview with Mike Read, ‘The Miracle’ album, May 1989" (Broadcast on BBC Radio 1)	41:18
3.	"Brian with Simon Bates, ‘Freddie and Too Much Love Will Kill You’, August 1992" (Broadcast on BBC Radio 1)	5:54
4.	"Brian with Johnnie Walker, ‘Freddie and the Tribute Concert’, October 1992" (Broadcast on BBC Radio 1)	2:51
Total length:		1:14:49

== Charts ==
Chart (2016)	Peak position
Austrian Albums (Ö3 Austria)	60
Belgian Albums (Ultratop Flanders)	65
Belgian Albums (Ultratop Wallonia)	52
Dutch Albums (Album Top 100)	47
French Albums (SNEP)	123
German Albums (Offizielle Top 100)	28
Italian Albums (FIMI)	73
Portuguese Albums (AFP)	27
Scottish Albums (Official Charts)	20
Spanish Albums (Promusicae)	32
Swiss Albums (Schweizer Hitparade)	84
UK Albums (Official Charts)	25
US Top Hard Rock Albums (Billboard)	19

Chart (2018)	Peak position
French Albums (SNEP)	96
