= At the Beeb =

At the BBC

Live album by Queen
- Released: 4 December 1989 (Europe); 1995 (US)
- Recorded: 5 February and 3 December 1973
- Studio: Langham 1
- Genre: Rock
- Length: 37:27
- Labels: Band of Joy ("by arrangement with BBC Records and Tapes and EMI Records Ltd") (UK); Hollywood (US)
- Producer: Bernie Andrews

Queen chronology
The Miracle (1989)	At the BBC (1989)	Innuendo (1991)

Alternative cover
- At the BBC reissue cover

Professional ratings
Review scores
Source	Rating
AllMusic	3.5/5 stars
MusicHound Rock	2.5/5 stars
The Rolling Stone Album Guide	3/5 stars
The Times	(?)

At the Beeb is a live album by the British rock band Queen, released on vinyl, cassette tape, and CD in 1989. It was released by Hollywood Records in 1995 in the United States and Canada under the title At the BBC on CD and as limited edition picture disc vinyl.

The album comprises tracks recorded in two sessions for the BBC Radio 1 Sound of the 70s programme. The first four tracks were recorded on 5 February 1973 and the rest were recorded on 3 December 1973.

All but one track appeared on the album Queen with the exception being "Ogre Battle" which appeared on Queen II. All the tracks were later released on the 2016 album On Air along with other session recordings.

== Track listing ==
At the Beeb track listing
No.	Title	Writer(s)	Length
1.	"My Fairy King"	Freddie Mercury	4:06
2.	"Keep Yourself Alive"	Brian May	3:48
3.	"Doing All Right"	Brian May & Tim Staffell	4:11
4.	"Liar"	Freddie Mercury	6:28
5.	"Ogre Battle"	Freddie Mercury	3:57
6.	"Great King Rat"	Freddie Mercury	5:59
7.	"Modern Times Rock 'N' Roll"	Roger Taylor	2:00
8.	"Son and Daughter"	Brian May	7:08
Total length:			37:27

== Chart performance ==
In 1989, At the Beeb debuted at number 67 in the United Kingdom.
