= A Night at the Odeon – Hammersmith 1975 =

Live album by Queen
- Released: 20 November 2015
- Recorded: 24 December 1975; 2015 (pitch-corrections)
- Venue: Hammersmith Odeon, London, UK
- Genre: Heavy metal, progressive rock
- Length: 73:21 (CD Edition)
- Label: Virgin EMI; Hollywood
- Producer: Justin Shirley-Smith; Kris Fredriksson; Josh Macrae

Queen chronology
Queen Forever (2014)	A Night at the Odeon – Hammersmith 1975 (2015)	On Air (2016)

A Night at the Odeon is a live album and video by the British rock band Queen. The album is the first official release of the band's Christmas Eve performance at the Hammersmith Odeon in 1975, filmed by the BBC. The show was broadcast on BBC2 and BBC Radio 1, and included one of the first live performances of "Bohemian Rhapsody". It is the band's most popular bootleg.

== Background ==
The 24 December 1975 gig at the Hammersmith Odeon was the final date of Queen's UK tour in support of the album A Night At The Opera, which had been released a few weeks previously, and had already gone gold. The single "Bohemian Rhapsody" was in the middle of its 9-week run at number one in the UK charts at the time of the gig, which was one of the first times the song was played live. Queen had already played four shows at the Odeon earlier during the tour and received positive reviews in the press, with Sounds Magazine saying "everything about them says that they are more important than any other band you've heard".

The gig was advertised in Melody Maker as "Britain's most regal band awaits your presence ..." and all 5,000 tickets sold out. Guitarist Brian May later recalled: "This concert was very special because it was the first time we ever played a whole show completely live on TV". Lead singer Freddie Mercury played a white Bechstein grand piano imported especially for the gig, and wore white and black catsuits, changing costume halfway through the show.

Though A Night at the Opera was in the charts at the time of show, the band's setlist mainly drew from earlier songs that worked well on stage, including May's solo guitar spot in the middle of the show, and a medley of old rock'n'roll songs towards the end. The band only played the ballad section of "Bohemian Rhapsody" as part of a medley with older material, and the only other Opera track was "God Save The Queen" played on tape at the very end of the show.

The show was broadcast on BBC2 as part of the music programme The Old Grey Whistle Test with the audio later broadcast on BBC Radio 1. Queen had appeared on the show several times previously when studio tracks were played alongside custom music videos. Whistle Test presenter Bob Harris introduced the band onstage and later recalled that Queen "were in party mood at the Hammersmith Odeon that night". Unfortunately, the cameras were packed away before the group's second encore, so only the audio of "Seven Seas of Rhye" and "See What a Fool I've Been" were recorded.

Because of the high-quality recording and filming, and nationwide television and radio broadcast, the gig has become the most popular bootleg recording of Queen. Many of the songs in the band's Hammersmith set were dropped on later tours, and did not appear on official live albums such as Live Killers and Live At Wembley '86.

The original multi-track tapes of the show were believed to be lost, before being recovered in 2009 and restored by Queen sound engineers Justin Shirley-Smith, Kris Fredriksson, and Josh Macrae. A 50-minute performance of the show was broadcast that year, again on BBC2. In 2011, a few of the tracks from this gig were officially released elsewhere as bonus tracks on reissues of Queen's studio albums: "White Queen" on Universal Records' reissue of Queen II and "Now I'm Here" on Sheer Heart Attack. "Ogre Battle" was also released as video only on the iTunes deluxe versions of the latter.

== Release ==
The remastered and restored show was shown at a special screening on 8 October 2015 at Olympic Studios Cinema, Barnes, where some of A Night at the Opera had been recorded.

The album was released on 20 November in CD, DVD, SD Blu-ray and double vinyl formats, as well as a deluxe box set including a hardback book, reproductions of period-specific tour memorabilia, and an audio recording of Now I'm Here recorded during the band's soundcheck for the show. The DVD/Blu-ray release also features bonus material from Queen's first tour of Japan in 1975 at the Nippon Budokan, and a 22-minute documentary featuring interviews from May, Roger Taylor and Harris entitled Looking Back at the Odeon.

== Track listing ==
=== CD ===
No.	Title	Writer(s)	Length
1.	"Now I'm Here"	Brian May	4:43
2.	"Ogre Battle"	Freddie Mercury	5:19
3.	"White Queen (As It Began)"	May	5:31
4.	"Bohemian Rhapsody"	Mercury	2:28
5.	"Killer Queen"	Mercury	2:08
6.	"The March of the Black Queen"	Mercury	1:30
7.	"Bohemian Rhapsody" (Reprise)	Mercury	1:02
8.	"Bring Back That Leroy Brown"	Mercury	1:32
9.	"Brighton Rock"	May	2:24
10.	"Guitar Solo"	May	6:37
11.	"Son and Daughter"	May	1:44
12.	"Keep Yourself Alive"	May	4:33
13.	"Liar"	Mercury	8:45
14.	"In the Lap of the Gods... Revisited"	Mercury	5:24
15.	"Big Spender"	Cy Coleman, Dorothy Fields	1:24
16.	"Jailhouse Rock / Stupid Cupid / Be-Bop-A-Lula / Jailhouse Rock" (Reprise)	Various Artist	9:21
17.	"Seven Seas of Rhye"	Mercury	3:11
18.	"See What a Fool I've Been"	May	4:22
19.	"God Save the Queen"	Traditional, arr. by May	1:23
Total length:			1:13:09

=== DVD/Blu-ray ===
No.	Title	Writer(s)	Length
1.	"Now I'm Here"	May	4:38
2.	"Ogre Battle"	Mercury	5:22
3.	"White Queen (As It Began)"	May	5:31
4.	"Bohemian Rhapsody"	Mercury	2:28
5.	"Killer Queen"	Mercury	2:08
6.	"The March of the Black Queen"	Mercury	1:29
7.	"Bohemian Rhapsody" (Reprise)	Mercury	1:02
8.	"Bring Back That Leroy Brown"	Mercury	1:27
9.	"Brighton Rock"	May	2:27
10.	"Guitar Solo"	May	6:37
11.	"Son and Daughter"	May	1:42
12.	"Keep Yourself Alive"	May	4:28
13.	"Liar"	Mercury	8:50
14.	"In the Lap of the Gods... Revisited"	Mercury	5:20
15.	"Big Spender"	Coleman, Fields	1:25
16.	"Jailhouse Rock / Stupid Cupid / Be-Bop-A-Lula / Jailhouse Rock" (Reprise)	Various Artist	6:14
17.	"God Save the Queen"	Traditional, Arrangement by May	1:25
Total length:			1:02:33

==== DVD/SD Blu-ray extras ====
Live in Japan '75

1. "Now I'm Here" (Live at the Budokan, Tokyo, Japan, 1 May 1975)
2. "Killer Queen" (Live at the Budokan, Tokyo, Japan, 1 May 1975)
3. "In the Lap of the Gods... Revisited" (Live at the Budokan, Tokyo, Japan, 1 May 1975)

Looking Back at the Odeon
A previously unreleased 22 minute documentary featuring interviews from Brian May, Roger Taylor and Bob Harris.

=== Vinyl ===
Side one
No.	Title	Writer(s)	Length
1.	"Now I'm Here"	May	4:43
2.	"Ogre Battle"	Mercury	5:19
3.	"White Queen (As It Began)"	May	5:31
Total length:			15:33

Side two
No.	Title	Writer(s)	Length
1.	"Bohemian Rhapsody"	Mercury	2:28
2.	"Killer Queen"	Mercury	2:08
3.	"The March of the Black Queen"	Mercury	1:30
4.	"Bohemian Rhapsody" (Reprise)	Mercury	1:02
5.	"Bring Back That Leroy Brown"	Mercury	1:32
6.	"Brighton Rock"	May	2:24
7.	"Guitar Solo"	May	6:37
8.	"Son and Daughter"	May	1:44
Total length:			19:25

Side three
No.	Title	Writer(s)	Length
1.	"Keep Yourself Alive"	May	4:33
2.	"Liar"	Mercury	8:45
3.	"In the Lap of the Gods... Revisited"	Mercury	5:24
Total length:			18:42

Side four
No.	Title	Writer(s)	Length
1.	"Big Spender"	Coleman, Fields	1:24
2.	"Jailhouse Rock / Stupid Cupid / Be-Bop-A-Lula / Jailhouse Rock" (Reprise)	Various Artist	9:21
3.	"Seven Seas of Rhye"	Mercury	3:11
4.	"See What a Fool I've Been"	May	4:22
5.	"God Save the Queen"	Trad., arr. by May	1:23
Total length:			19:41

== Personnel ==
- Freddie Mercury – lead vocals, piano, tambourine on "Liar"
- Brian May – guitar, backing vocals, ukulele on "Bring Back That Leroy Brown"
- Roger Taylor – drums, percussion, backing vocals, co-lead vocals on "The March of the Black Queen"
- John Deacon – bass guitar, backing vocals, triangle on "Killer Queen"

== Charts ==
Chart (2015)	Peak position
Australian Albums (ARIA)	175
Austrian Albums (Ö3 Austria)	57
Belgian Albums (Ultratop Flanders)	60
Belgian Albums (Ultratop Wallonia)	42
Dutch Albums (Album Top 100)	28
French Albums (SNEP)	118
German Albums (Offizielle Top 100)	34
Italian Albums (FIMI)	55
Scottish Albums (OCC)	36
Spanish Albums (Promusicae)	41
Swiss Albums (Schweizer Hitparade)	31
UK Albums (OCC)	40
UK Vinyl Albums (OCC)	6
US Top Rock Albums (Billboard)	46
