= Bohemian Rhapsody =

1975 single by Queen

- Artwork for UK and some other European singles

Single by Queen

from the album A Night at the Opera
- B-side: "I'm in Love with My Car"
- Released: 31 October 1975
- Recorded: 24 August–September 1975
- Studio: Rockfield, Monmouthshire; Roundhouse, London; Sarm, London; Scorpio Sound, London; Wessex Sound, London
- Genre: Progressive rock; hard rock; progressive pop; art rock; art pop
- Length: 5:55
- Label: EMI
- Songwriter: Freddie Mercury
- Producers: Roy Thomas Baker; Queen

Queen singles chronology
"Now I'm Here" (1975)	"Bohemian Rhapsody" (1975)	"You're My Best Friend" (1976)

Music video
- "Bohemian Rhapsody" on YouTube

"Bohemian Rhapsody" is the penultimate song from British rock band Queen's fourth studio album, A Night at the Opera. It is a suite composed of five main elements: an introduction, a ballad, an opera, a hard rock segment, and a reflective coda. Released in 1975 as the lead single from the album, "Bohemian Rhapsody" is one of the few progressive rock songs of the 1970s to reach a mainstream audience and is now regarded as the band's signature song.

Written by the band's lead singer, Freddie Mercury, he referred to "Bohemian Rhapsody" as a "mock opera" that resulted from the combination of three songs he had written. It was recorded by Queen and co-producer Roy Thomas Baker at five studios between August and September 1975. Due to recording logistics of the era, the band had to bounce the tracks across eight generations of 24-track tape, meaning that they required nearly 200 tracks for overdubs.

The promotional video is credited with furthering the development of the music video medium. It has appeared in numerous polls of the greatest songs in popular music, including a ranking at number 17 on Rolling Stone's 2021 list of the "500 Greatest Songs of All Time". A Rolling Stone readers' poll also ranked Mercury's vocal performance in the song as the greatest in rock history.

"Bohemian Rhapsody" topped the UK Singles Chart for nine weeks (plus another five weeks following Mercury's death in 1991) and is the UK's third best-selling single of all time. It also topped the charts in countries including Canada where it spent two weeks at the top position, Australia, New Zealand, Ireland, and the Netherlands, and has sold over six million copies worldwide. In the United States, the song peaked at number nine in 1976, but reached a new peak of number two after appearing in the 1992 film Wayne's World. In 2004, the song was inducted into the Grammy Hall of Fame. Following the release of the 2018 biopic Bohemian Rhapsody, it became the most streamed song from the 20th century. In 2021, it was certified diamond in the US for combined digital sales/streams equal to 10 million units. In 2022, it was inducted into the National Recording Registry by the Library of Congress for being "culturally, historically, or aesthetically significant".

== History and recording ==
It was basically three songs that I wanted to put out, and I just put the three together.

— Freddie Mercury

According to Mercury's friend Chris Smith (a keyboard player in Smile), Mercury first started developing "Bohemian Rhapsody" in the late 1960s; Mercury used to play parts of songs he was writing at the time on the piano, and one of his pieces, known simply as "The Cowboy Song", contained lyrics that ended up in the completed version produced years later, in 1975, specifically, "Mama ... just killed a man." Producer Roy Thomas Baker, who began working with Queen in 1972, related how Mercury once played the opening ballad section on the piano for him in Mercury's flat:

He played the beginning on the piano, then stopped and said, "And this is where the opera section comes in!" Then we went out to eat dinner.

Guitarist Brian May said the band thought that Mercury's blueprint for the song was "intriguing and original, and worthy of work". According to May, much of Queen's material was written in the studio, but this song "was all in Freddie's mind" before they started.

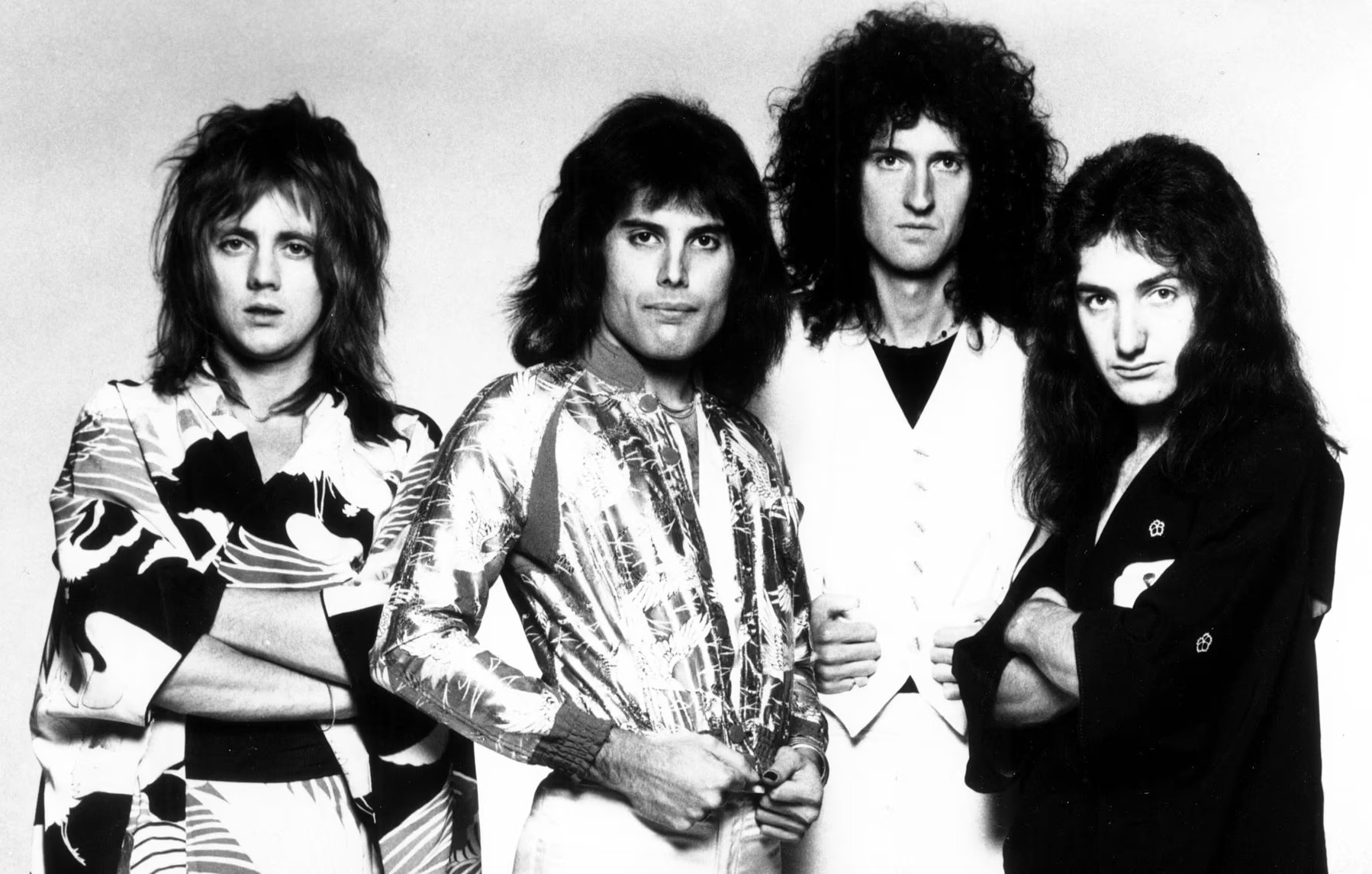
1975 publicity photo of Queen

Queen spent a month rehearsing at Ridge Farm Studio in Surrey in mid-1975, and drummer Roger Taylor recalled that "Bohemian Rhapsody" was one of the songs the band worked on while they were there. Recording began on 24 August 1975 at Rockfield Studio 1 near Monmouth, South Wales, after a three-week rehearsal at Penrhos Court, near Kington, Herefordshire. During the making of the track, four additional studios – Roundhouse, Sarm Studios, Scorpio Sound, and Wessex Sound Studios – were used. According to some band members, Mercury mentally prepared the song beforehand and directed the band throughout.

Mercury used a C. Bechstein concert grand piano, which he played in the promotional video and the UK tour. Due to the elaborate nature of the song, it was recorded in various sections. The piano was allegedly the same one Paul McCartney had used to record the Beatles' song "Hey Jude", as well as the same one Rick Wakeman used on David Bowie's 1971 album Hunky Dory.

Baker recalled in 1999:

"Bohemian Rhapsody" was totally insane, but we enjoyed every minute of it. It was basically a joke, but a successful joke. [laughs] We had to record it in three separate units. We did the whole beginning bit, then the whole middle bit and then the whole end. It was complete madness. The middle part started off being just a couple of seconds, but Freddie kept coming in with more "Galileos" and we kept on adding to the opera section, and it just got bigger and bigger. We never stopped laughing ... It started off as a ballad, but the end was heavy.

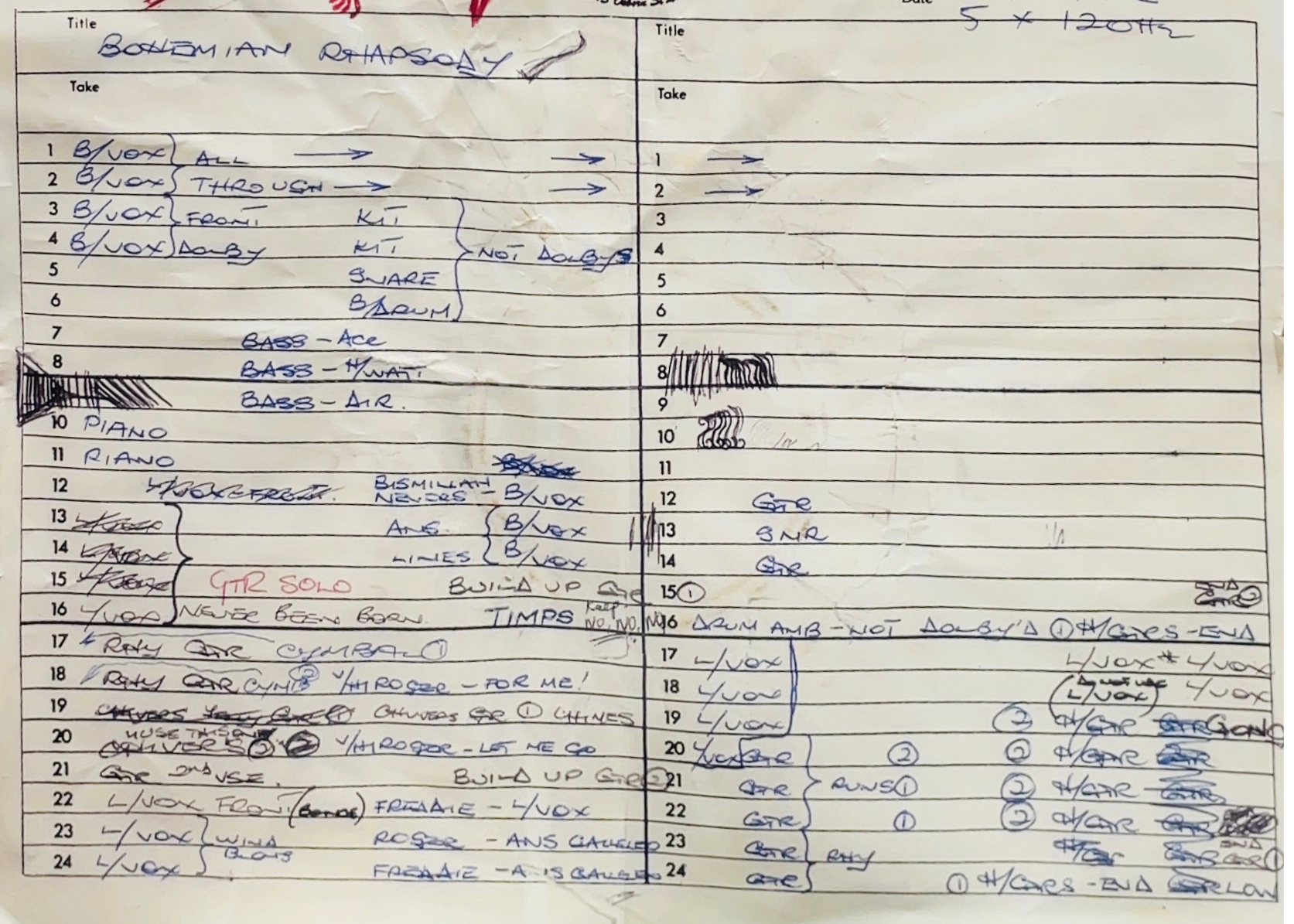
Recording track sheet (replica)

May, Mercury, and Taylor reportedly sang their vocal parts continually for 10 to 12 hours a day. The entire piece took three weeks to record, and in some sections featured 180 overdubs. In multiple interviews, May recalled how Mercury's vocal overdubs were so exquisitely precise that he would create a natural phasing effect.

Since the studios of the time only offered 24-track analogue tape, it was necessary for the three to overdub themselves many times and "bounce" these down to successive sub-mixes. In the end, eighth-generation tapes were used. The various sections of tape containing the desired sub-mixes had to be spliced (cut and assembled in the correct sequence). May recalled placing a tape in front of the light and being able to see through it, as the tape had been used so many times.

A similar story was told in 1977 by Taylor regarding the elaborate overdubs and sub-mixes for "The March of The Black Queen" for the album Queen II. At that time, the band was using 16-track equipment.

Producer Baker recalls that May's solo was done on only one track rather than recording multiple tracks. May stated that he wanted to compose "a little tune that would be a counterpart to the main melody; I didn't just want to play the melody". The guitarist said that his better material stems from this way of working, in which he thought of the tune before playing it: "The fingers tend to be predictable unless being led by the brain." According to Baker,

... the end of the song was much heavier because it was one of the first mixes to be done with automation ... If you really listen to it, the ballad starts off clean, and as the opera section gets louder and louder, the vocals get more and more distorted. You can still hear this on the CD. They are clearly distorted.

In May 2023, an early handwritten draft unearthed from an auction of items that belonged to Mercury, courtesy of his friend Mary Austin, revealed that Mercury originally considered the song to be titled "Mongolian Rhapsody". It was explained that he wrote the title along with the lyrics in 1974 on a page of stationery from defunct airline British Midland Airways, but crossed out the word "Mongolian" and replaced it with "Bohemian". There is a 1962 Decca album of the same name, with music by Bohemian composers Bedřich Smetana and Antonín Dvořák.

== Composition and analysis ==
"Bohemian Rhapsody" has been affiliated to the genres of progressive rock (sometimes called symphonic rock), hard rock, art rock, progressive pop, and art pop. The song is highly unusual for a popular single in featuring no chorus, combining disparate musical styles, and containing lyrics which eschew conventional love-based narratives, and instead make allusions to murder and nihilism.

Music scholar Sheila Whiteley suggests that "the title draws strongly on contemporary rock ideology, the individualism of the bohemian artists' world, with rhapsody affirming the romantic ideals of art rock". Commenting on bohemianism, Judith Peraino said,

Mercury intended ... [this song] to be a 'mock opera', something outside the norm of rock songs, and it does follow a certain operatic logic: Choruses of multi-tracked voices alternate with aria-like solos, the emotions are excessive, the plot confusing.

"Bohemian Rhapsody" begins with an introduction, then goes into a piano ballad, before a guitar solo leads to an operatic interlude. A hard rock part follows this and it concludes with a coda. The song is in the keys of B♭ major, E♭ major, A major and F major, and is predominantly in 4/4 meter. This musical format of writing a song as a suite with changes in style, tone, and tempo throughout was uncommon in most mainstream pop and rock music, but common in progressive rock, a genre which had reached its artistic and commercial zenith between 1970 and 1975 in the music of British bands such as Jethro Tull, Yes, Genesis, Emerson, Lake & Palmer, Gentle Giant, Van der Graaf Generator, and Curved Air. The music of progressive rock was characterised by dramatic contrasts, frequent shifts in tempo and in rhythmic character from one section of a composition to the next. Bands from the genre blended rock with classical music, including its structural features, compositional practices, and instrumentation. Queen had embraced progressive rock as one of their many diverse influences.

"Bohemian Rhapsody" parodies many different elements of opera by using bombastic choruses, sarcastic recitative, and distorted Italian operatic phrases. An embryonic version of this style had already been used in Mercury's earlier compositions for the band's "My Fairy King" (1973) and "The March of the Black Queen" (1974).

=== Intro (0:00–0:49) ===
The song begins with a close five-part harmony a cappella introduction in B♭ major—as evidenced by the presence of a V–I cadence (F7–B♭) multi-track recordings of Mercury although the video has all four members lip-syncing this part. The lyrics question whether life is "real" or "just fantasy caught in a landslide" before concluding that there can be "no escape from reality". The section is nearly entirely in 4/4 time, with the exception of measure 3 ("Caught in a landslide, no es—") switching to 5/4 time, then returning to 4/4 after.

After 20 seconds, the grand piano enters, the song modulates briefly to E♭ major via another perfect cadence (B♭7–E♭) and Mercury's voice alternates with the other vocal parts. The narrator introduces himself as "just a poor boy" but declares that he "needs no sympathy" because he is "easy come, easy go" and then "little high, little low" (when heard in stereo, the words "little high" come from the left speaker and "little low" comes from the right, the other respective speaker plays the piano at the same time); chromatic side-slipping on "easy come, easy go" highlights the dream-like atmosphere. The end of this section is marked by the bass entrance and the cross-handed piano vamp in B♭.

=== Ballad (0:49–2:37) ===
"Mama, just killed a man"
This sample features the distinctive piano phrase in B♭ and the first line of the first verse.

The piano begins in B♭ major along with the entrance of John Deacon's bass guitar, marking the onset of this section. After it plays twice, Mercury's vocals enter. Throughout the section, the vocals evolve from a softly sung harmony to an impassioned solo performance by Mercury. The narrator explains to his mother that he has "just killed a man", with "a gun against [the man's] head" and in doing so, has thrown his life away. This "confessional" section, Whiteley comments, is "affirmative of the nurturant and life-giving force of the feminine and the need for absolution". In the middle of the verse (1:19), Taylor's drums enter, and a descending chromatic run leads to a temporary modulation to E♭ major (up one fourth). The narrator makes the second of several invocations to his "mama" in the new key, continuing the original theme. The narrator explains his regret over "mak[ing] you cry" and urging "mama" to "carry on as if nothing really matters". A brief, descending variation of the piano phrase connects to the second verse.

Then the piano intro plays, marking the start of the second verse. As the ballad proceeds into its second verse, the speaker confesses how ashamed he is by his act of murder (as May enters on guitar and mimics the upper range of the piano at 1:50). May imitates a bell tree during the line "sends shivers down my spine", by playing the strings of his guitar on the other side of the bridge. The narrator bids the world goodbye announcing he has "got to go" and prepares to "face the truth" admitting "I don't want to die / I sometimes wish I'd never been born at all". This is where the guitar solo enters.

=== Guitar solo (2:37–3:05) ===
Towards the end of the ballad section, the band builds in intensity, incorporating a guitar solo (in E♭ major) played and composed by Brian May. The intensity continues to build, but once the bass line completes its descent establishing modulation to the new key (A major), the entire band cuts out abruptly at 3:03 except for quiet, staccato A major quaver (eighth-note) chords on the piano, marking the start of the "Opera" section.

=== Opera (3:05–4:07) ===
"Scaramouche, Scaramouche, will you do the fandango?"
The operatic segment enters immediately as May's solo abruptly concludes. This vast shift in style is just one example of how the song rapidly changes throughout its running time.

A rapid series of rhythmic and harmonic changes introduces a pseudo-operatic midsection, which contains the bulk of the elaborate vocal multi-tracking. While the underlying pulse of the song is maintained, the dynamics vary greatly from bar to bar, from only Mercury's voice accompanied by a piano to a multi-voice choir supported by drums, bass, piano, and timpani. The choir effect was created by having May, Mercury, and Taylor repeatedly sing their vocal parts, resulting in 180 separate overdubs. These overdubs were then combined into successive submixes. According to Roger Taylor, the voices of May, Mercury, and himself combined created a wide vocal range: "Brian could get down quite low, Freddie had a powerful voice through the middle, and I was good at the high stuff." The band wanted to create "a wall of sound, that starts down and goes all the way up". The band used the bell effect for lyrics "Magnifico" and "let me go". Also, on "let him go", Taylor singing the top section carries his note on further after the rest of the "choir" have stopped singing.

Lyrical references in this passage include Scaramouche, the fandango, Galileo Galilei, Figaro, and Beelzebub, with cries of "Bismillah! [Arabic: "In the name of God!"] We will not let you go!", as rival factions fight over his soul, some wishing to "let [him] go" and "spare him his life from this monstrosity", with others sending him "thunderbolts and lightning – very, very frightening [to him]". In Freddie Mercury: The Definitive Biography, Lesley-Ann Jones theorises that it is also a figurative representation of the four members: Mercury, May, Taylor, and Deacon respectively. The section concludes with a full choral treatment of the lyric "Beelzebub has a devil put aside for me!", on a block B♭ major chord. Roger Taylor tops the final chord with a falsetto B♭ in the fifth octave (B♭5).

Using the 24-track technology available at the time, the "opera" section took about three weeks to finish. Baker said, "Every time Freddie came up with another Galileo, I would add another piece of tape to the reel." Baker recalls that they kept wearing out the tape, which meant having to do transfers.

=== Hard rock (4:07–4:54) ===
The operatic section leads into a rock interlude with a guitar riff written by Mercury. At 4:15, a quadruple-tracked Mercury (in stereo, the four parts are panned two on the left and two on the right) sings angry lyrics addressed to an unspecified "you", accusing them of betrayal and abuse and insisting "can't do this to me, baby", before the final lines conclude that the singer "just gotta get right outta" an unspecified "here". Three ascending guitar runs follow. Mercury then plays a similar B♭ run on the piano, as the song builds up to the finale with a ritardando.

=== Outro (4:54–5:55) ===
After Mercury plays ascending octaves of notes from the B♭ mixolydian mode (composed of the notes from the E♭ scale), the song then returns to the tempo and form of the introduction, initially in E♭ major, before quickly modulating to C minor, only to soon go through an abrupt short series of modulations, bringing it back to C minor again in time for the final "nothing really matters" section. A guitar accompanies the chorus "ooh, ooh yeah, ooh yeah". A double-tracked twin guitar melody is played through an amplifier designed by John Deacon, affectionately nicknamed the "Deacy Amp". Mercury's line "Nothing really matters ..." appears again, "cradled by light piano arpeggios suggesting both resignation (minor tonalities) and a new sense of freedom in the wide vocal span". After the line "nothing really matters" is repeated multiple times, the song finally concludes in the key of E♭ major, although it changes again to F major just before it ends. The final line, "Any way the wind blows", is followed by the quiet sound of a large tam-tam that finally expels the tension built up throughout the song.

== Lyrics ==
The New York Times commented that "the song's most distinct feature is the fatalistic lyrics". Mercury refused to explain his composition other than to say it was about relationships; the band is still protective of the song's secret. Brian May supports suggestions that the song contained veiled references to Mercury's personal traumas. He recalls "Freddie was a very complex person: flippant and funny on the surface, but he concealed insecurities and problems in squaring up his life with his childhood. He never explained the lyrics, but I think he put a lot of himself into that song." May, though, says the band had agreed that the core of a lyric was a private issue for the composer. In a BBC Three documentary about the making of "Bohemian Rhapsody", Roger Taylor maintains that the true meaning of the song is "fairly self-explanatory with just a bit of nonsense in the middle".

It's one of those songs which has such a fantasy feel about it. I think people should just listen to it, think about it, and then make up their own minds as to what it says to them ... "Bohemian Rhapsody" didn't just come out of thin air. I did a bit of research although it was tongue-in-cheek and mock opera. Why not?

— Freddie Mercury

Despite this, critics, both journalistic and academic, have speculated over the meaning behind the song's lyrics. Some believe the lyrics describe a suicidal murderer haunted by demons or depict events just preceding an execution. The latter explanation points to Albert Camus's novel The Stranger, in which a young man confesses to an impulsive murder and has an epiphany before he is executed, as probable inspiration.

Other critics interpreted the lyrics as Mercury's way of dealing with personal issues. Music scholar Sheila Whiteley observes that Mercury reached a turning point in his personal life in the year he wrote "Bohemian Rhapsody". He had been living with Mary Austin for seven years but had just embarked on his first love affair with a man. She suggests that the song provides an insight into Mercury's emotional state at the time, "living with Mary ('Mamma', as in Mother Mary) and wanting to break away ('Mamma mia let me go')". Others suggest it as a veiled reference to coming out, and dealing with the repercussions of the sodomy laws of the time. In addition, the song can be interpreted as coming from the perspective of a person on death row, reflecting on their life and preparing for their last moments.

Still others believe the lyrics were only written to fit with the music, and had no intended meaning; the D.J., television entertainer, and comedian Kenny Everett, who played an influential role in popularising the single on his radio show on Capital Radio, quoted Mercury as claiming the lyrics were simply "random rhyming nonsense".

== Release ==
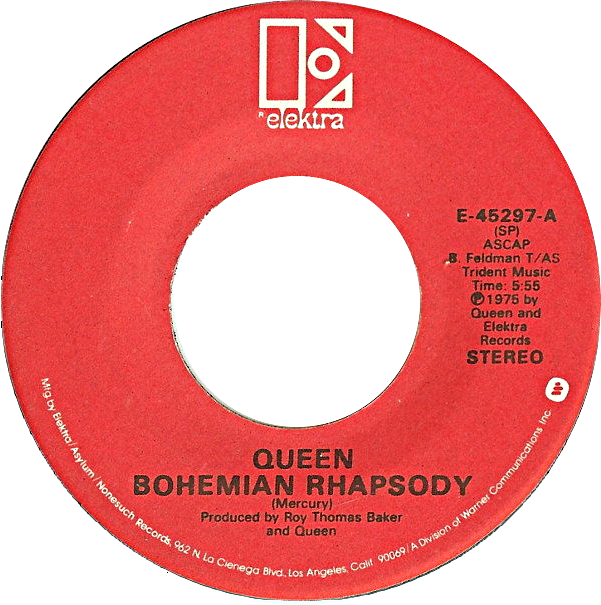
One of Side-A labels of the US single release

When the band wanted to release the single in 1975, various executives suggested to them that due to its length of 5 minutes and 55 seconds, it was too long and would never be a hit. Mercury commenting on the length of the song:

It had a very big risk factor. The radios didn't really like it initially because it was too long and the record companies said you can't market it that way, and after me having virtually put the three songs together, they wanted me to sort of slice it up again, so I said no way. They said nobody would play it, it's too long and I just said it either goes out in its entirety or not at all. So it was a big risk, it was either going to be a big flop because nobody would play it or something would happen and luckily it became a major hit.

The song was played to other musicians who commented the band had no hope of it ever being played on radio. According to Baker, he and the band bypassed this corporate assessment by playing the song for Everett:

"we had a reel-to-reel copy but we told him he could only have it if he promised not to play it. 'I won't play it,' he said, winking ..."

The plan worked — Everett teased his listeners by playing only parts of the song. Audience demand intensified when Everett played the full song on his show 14 times in 2 days. Hordes of fans attempted to buy the single the following Monday, only to be told by record stores that it had not yet been released. The same weekend, Paul Drew, who ran the RKO General stations in the U.S., heard the track on Everett's show in London. Drew managed to get a copy of the tape and started to play it in the U.S., which forced the hand of Queen's U.S. label, Elektra Records. In an interview with Sound on Sound, Baker observed that "it was a strange situation where radio on both sides of the Atlantic was breaking a record that the record companies said would never get airplay!"

Eventually the unedited single was released, with "I'm in Love with My Car" as the B-side. Following Everett's escapade in October 1975, Eric Hall, a record plugger, gave a copy to David "Diddy" Hamilton to play on his weekday Radio One show. Hall stated "Monster, Monster! This could be a hit!"

The song became the 1975 UK Christmas number one, holding the top position for nine weeks. "Bohemian Rhapsody" was the first song ever to get to number one in the UK twice with the same version, and is also the only single to have been Christmas number one twice with the same version. The second was upon its re-release (as a double A-side single with "These Are the Days of Our Lives") in 1991, following Mercury's death, staying at number one for five weeks. The re-released version sold 673,000 copies in 1991 in the UK.

In the US, the single was also a success, although initially to a lesser extent than in the UK. The single, released in December 1975, reached number nine on the Billboard Hot 100 and was certified gold by the Recording Industry Association of America for sales of one million copies.

In a retrospective article, Anthony DeCurtis of Rolling Stone explained why the song performed less strongly in the US charts by saying that it is "the quintessential example of the kind of thing that doesn't exactly go over well in America". Its chart run of 24 weeks, however, placed it at number 18 on Billboard's year-end chart, higher than some number 1s of the year. With the Canadian record-buying public, the single fared better, reaching number one in the RPM national singles chart for the week ending 1 May 1976.

In the US, "Bohemian Rhapsody" was re-released as a double A-side cassette single with "The Show Must Go On" in January 1992, two months after the death of Freddie Mercury, with proceeds going to the Magic Johnson Foundation for AIDS research. The song re-entered the Billboard Hot 100 chart after 16 years, reaching number two (behind Kris Kross's "Jump"), and spending 17 weeks on the chart. After the release of the Queen biopic named after the song, it re-entered the charts for a third time at number 33, marking 26 years since it last charted.

In March 2021, it was certified Diamond (10× platinum) in the US for combined digital sales and streams equal to 10 million units. It had sold 4.4 million digital copies in the US as of September 2017. As of September 2025, it is the most-streamed song from the 20th century, with more than 2.8 billion plays on Spotify alone.

== Promotional video ==
Though some artists had made video clips to accompany songs (including Queen themselves; for example, their earlier singles "Keep Yourself Alive", "Liar", "Seven Seas of Rhye" and "Killer Queen" already had "pop promos", as they were known at the time), it was only after the success of "Bohemian Rhapsody" that it became a regular practice for record companies to produce promotional videos for artists' single releases. The Guardian stated it "ensured videos would henceforth be a mandatory tool in the marketing of music". These videos could then be shown on television shows around the world, such as the BBC's Top of the Pops, without the need for the artist to appear in person. A promo video also allowed the artist to have their music broadcast and accompanied by their own choice of visuals rather than dancers such as Pan's People. According to May, the video was produced so that the band could avoid miming on Top of the Pops, since they would have looked off miming to such a complex song. He also said that the band knew they would be set to appear at Dundee's Caird Hall on tour, a date which clashed with the programme, thus a promo would solve the issue. The video has been hailed as launching the MTV age.

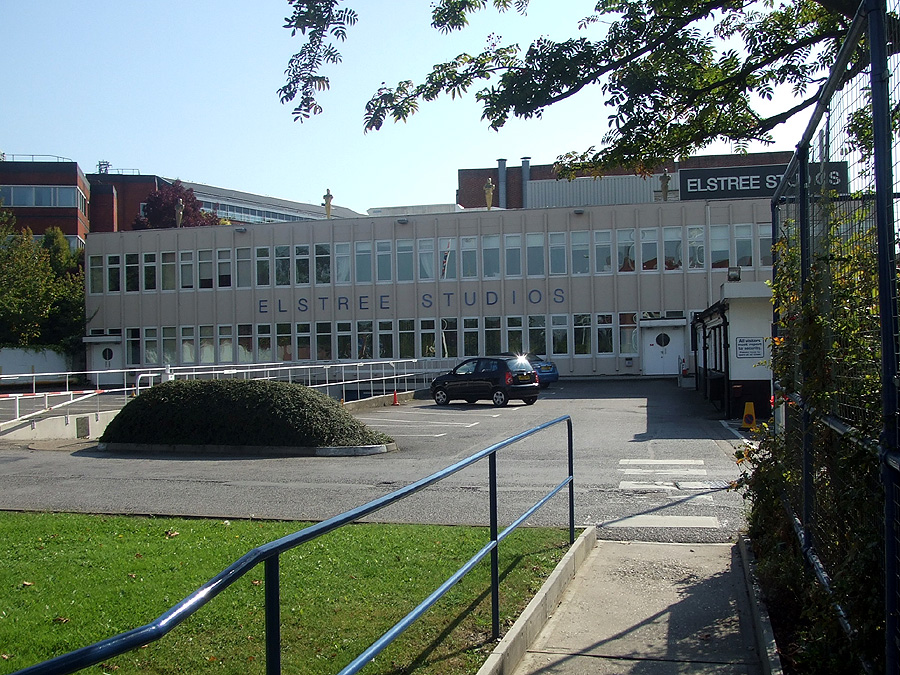
The "Bohemian Rhapsody" music video was shot at Elstree Studios in November 1975

The band used Trillion, a subsidiary of Trident Studios, their former management company and recording studio. They hired one of their trucks and got it to Elstree Studios in Hertfordshire, where the band were rehearsing for their tour. The video was directed by Bruce Gowers, who had directed a video of the band's 1974 performance at the Rainbow Theatre in London, and was recorded by cameraman Barry Dodd and assistant director/floor manager Jim McCutcheon. The video was recorded in just four hours on 10 November 1975, at a cost of £4,500. Gowers reported that the band was involved in the discussion of the video and the result, and "was a co-operative to that extent, but there was only one leader."

It became the first record to be pushed into the forefront by virtue of a video. Queen were certainly the first band to create a 'concept' video. The video captured the musical imagery perfectly. You cannot hear that music without seeing the visuals in your mind's eye.

— Rock DJ Tommy Vance.

The video opens with a shot of the four band members standing in diamond formation with their heads tilted back in near darkness as they sing the a cappella part. The lights fade up, and the shots cross-fade into close-ups of Mercury. The composition of the shot is the same as Mick Rock's cover photograph for their second album Queen II. The photo, inspired by a photograph of actress Marlene Dietrich, was the band's favourite image of themselves. The video then fades into them playing their instruments. In the opera section of the video, the scene reverts to the Queen II standing positions, after which they perform once again on stage during the hard rock segment. In the closing seconds of the video Roger Taylor is depicted stripped to the waist, striking the tam-tam in the manner of the trademark of the Rank Organisation's Gongman, familiar in the UK as the opening of all Rank film productions.

All of the special effects were achieved during the recording, rather than editing. The visual effect of Mercury's face cascading away (during the echoed lines "Magnifico" and "Let me go") was accomplished by pointing the camera at a monitor, giving visual feedback, a glare analogous to audio feedback. The honeycomb illusion was created using a shaped lens. The video was edited within five hours because it was due to be broadcast the same week in which it was taped. The video was sent to the BBC as soon as it was completed and aired for the first time on Top of the Pops in November 1975.

== Critical reception ==
Although the song has become one of the most revered in popular music history, the initial critical reaction was mixed. The UK music papers reacted with bemusement, recognising that the song was original and technically accomplished, but they mostly remained indifferent. Pete Erskine of NME observed that, "It'll be interesting to see whether it'll be played in its entirety on the radio. It's performed extremely well, but more in terms of production than anything else... Someone somewhere has decided that the boys' next release must sound 'epic'. And it does. They sound extremely self-important."

Allan Jones of Melody Maker was unimpressed, describing the song as "a superficially impressive pastiche of incongruous musical styles" and that Queen "contrived to approximate the demented fury of the Balham Amateur Operatic Society performing The Pirates of Penzance... 'Bohemian Rhapsody' is full of drama, passion and romance and sounds rather like one of those mini-opera affairs that Pete Townshend used to tack on to the end of Who albums", before concluding, "The significance of the composition eludes me totally, though I must admit to finding it horrifically fascinating. It's likely to be a hit of enormous proportions despite its length." Ray Fox-Cumming of Record Mirror was also left unmoved, saying, "It has no immediate selling point whatsoever: among its many parts. there's scarcely a shred of a tune and certainly no one line to latch onto. There's no denying that it's devilishly clever, encompassing everything from bits of operatic harmonies to snatches that sound like Sparks and David Cassidy, but, in the end the whole adds up to less than the sum of its parts." He did, however, say that it was "unthinkable" that it wouldn't be a hit. The most positive review came from Sounds, which called it "impossibly disjointed and complex, but a dazzlingly clever epic from the fevered mind of Freddie Mercury". Cash Box called it "a softly sung ode to the prospect of moving on from staid ways" with "good singing" and "good production." Record World called it "a majestic vocal performance that takes on operatic proportions."

== Legacy ==
=== Musical impact ===
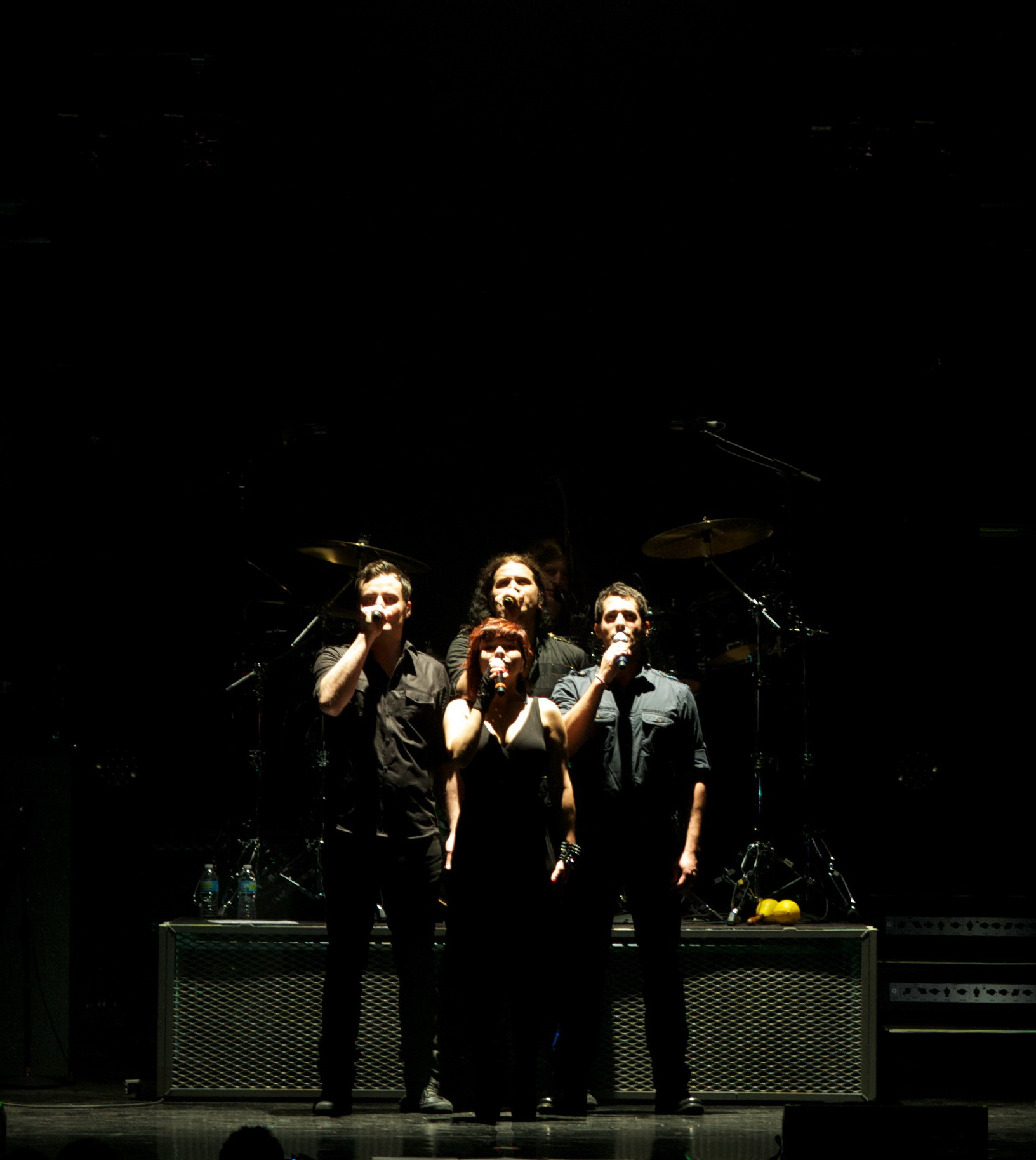
The Queen Extravaganza performing the song at the Fox Theatre, Detroit in 2012

In 1976, when asked for his opinion on "Bohemian Rhapsody", the Beach Boys' leader Brian Wilson praised the song as "the most competitive thing that's come along in ages" and "a fulfillment and an answer to a teenage prayer—of artistic music". Producer Steve Levine said the track broke "all sonic production barriers" in a fashion similar to the Beach Boys' "Good Vibrations" (1966), which also consisted of disparate music sections recorded separately, Phil Spector's "Be My Baby" (1963), and 10cc's "I'm Not in Love" (1975). Greg Lake, whose song "I Believe in Father Christmas" was kept from number one in the UK by "Bohemian Rhapsody" when it was released in 1975, acknowledged that he was "beaten by one of the greatest records ever made", describing it as "a once-in-a-lifetime recording".

Addressing the song's enduring popularity, author and music lecturer Jochen Eisentraut wrote in 2012: "A year before punk made it unfashionable, progressive rock had an astounding success with the theoretically over-length (nearly 6-minute) single 'Bohemian Rhapsody' which bore many of the hallmarks of the 'prog' genre". He said it was "unique at this point to hear a hit single in this style", it was "more accessible than other music of the genre" and was "able to communicate beyond the usual confines of the style". Author and progressive rock historian Stephen Lambe called it a "remarkable" single and said it "provides a neat but coincidental bridge between prog in its prime and the move to more aggressive songwriting", suggesting the song "feels like a grotesque (although probably unintentional) parody of progressive rock". The New Rolling Stone Album Guide described it as "either a prog-rock benchmark or the most convoluted novelty song ever recorded". Writing for the BBC in 2015, the Chicago Tribune's music critic Greg Kot called it a "prog-rock pocket operetta" and said the song's "reign as a work of wigged-out genius rather than a dated gimmick testifies to its go-for-broke attitude—one that has resonated across generations".

In 2009, The Guardian's music critic, Tom Service, examined the song's relationship with the traditions of classical music, describing its popularity as "one of the strangest musical phenomena out there":

The precedents of "Bohemian Rhapsody" are as much in the 19th-century classical traditions of rhapsodic, quasi-improvisational reveries—like, say, the piano works of Schumann or Chopin or the tone-poems of Strauss or Liszt—as they are in prog-rock or the contemporary pop of 1975. That's because the song manages a sleight of musical hand that only a handful of real master-musicians have managed: the illusion that its huge variety of styles—from intro, to ballad, to operatic excess, to hard-rock, to reflective coda—are unified into a single statement, a drama that somehow makes sense. It's a classic example of the unity in diversity that high-minded musical commentators have heard in the symphonies of Beethoven or the operas of Mozart. And that's exactly what the piece is: a miniature operatic-rhapsodic-symphonic-tone-poem.

A comparison was also made between the song and Led Zeppelin's 1971 epic "Stairway to Heaven" by music writers Pete Prown and HP Newquist. They observed both songs were "a slow, introspective beginning and gradual climb to a raging metal jam and back again", with the notable distinction being "while Zeppelin meshed folk influences with heavy metal, Queen opted for the light grandeur of the operetta as part of its hard rock". They said "for sheer cleverness alone, not to mention May's riveting electric work, 'Bohemian Rhapsody' rightfully became one of the top singles of 1975 and established Queen in the elite of seventies rock bands".

In 2015, The Economist described it as "one of the most innovative pieces of the progressive rock era". It wrote "though Led Zeppelin's John Paul Jones and the Beatles' Paul McCartney had experimented with symphonic elements, and Roger Waters of Pink Floyd and Pete Townshend of the Who had created narrative albums with distinct 'movements', none had had the audacity to import a miniature opera into rock music."

In 2023, Loudwire reported that the song's lyrics were the most-searched in the rock genre from January 2019 through July 2023, according to an independent study of search engine data pulled from Google Trends.

=== Wayne's World ===
In 1992, the song enjoyed renewed popularity in the United States after being featured in a scene in the film Wayne's World, in which the titular character and his friends headbang in a car to the hard rock part near the end of the song. The film's director, Penelope Spheeris, was hesitant to use the song, as it did not entirely fit with the lead characters, who were fans of less flamboyant hard rock and heavy metal. Mike Myers insisted that the song fit the scene. According to music scholar Theodore Gracyk, by 1992, when the film was released, even "classic rock" stations had stopped playing the almost six-minute song. Gracyk suggests that beginning the tape in the middle of the song after "the lyrics which provide the song's narrative ... forces the film's audience to respond to its presence in the scene without the 'commentary' of the lyrics". Helped by the song, the soundtrack album of the film was a major hit.

In connection with this, a new video was released, interspersing excerpts from the film with footage from the original Queen video, along with some live footage of the band. Myers was horrified that the record company had mixed clips from Wayne's World with Queen's original video, fearing that this would upset the band. He said, "they've just whizzed on a Picasso." He asked the record company to tell Queen that the video was not his idea and that he apologised to them. The band, though, sent a reply simply saying, "Thank you for using our song." This astonished Myers, who responded, "Thank you for even letting me touch the hem of your garments!"

The Wayne's World video version of "Bohemian Rhapsody" won Queen its only MTV Video Music Award for "Best Video from a Film". When remaining members Brian May and Roger Taylor took the stage to accept the award, Brian May was overcome with emotion and said that "Freddie would be tickled." In the final scene of the video, a pose of the band from the video from the original "Bohemian Rhapsody" clip morphs into an identically posed 1985 photo, first featured in the "One Vision" video.

In the 2018 Queen biopic feature film Bohemian Rhapsody, Myers makes a cameo as a fictional record executive who pans the song and refuses to release it as a single, proclaiming that it is too long for radio and that it is not a song that "teenagers can crank up the volume in their car and bang their heads to", a reference to the aforementioned scene in Wayne's World.

=== Achievements and accolades ===
The song has won numerous awards and has been covered and parodied by many artists. At the 19th Annual Grammy Awards in February 1977, "Bohemian Rhapsody" received two Grammy Award nominations for Best Pop Vocal Performance by a Duo, Group or Chorus and Best Arrangement for Voices. In October 1977, only two years after its release, the British Phonographic Industry named "Bohemian Rhapsody" as the best British single of the period 1952–77. It is a regular entry in greatest-songs polls, and it was named by the Guinness Book of Records in 2002 as the top British single of all time. The song is also listed in the Rock and Roll Hall of Fame's 500 Songs that Shaped Rock and Roll.

In 2004, the song was inducted into the Grammy Hall of Fame. As of 2004, "Bohemian Rhapsody" is the second most-played song on British radio, in clubs and on jukeboxes collectively, after Procol Harum's "A Whiter Shade of Pale". On 30 September 2007 for BBC Radio 1's 40th birthday, it was revealed on The Radio 1 Chart Show that "Bohemian Rhapsody" had been the most played song since Radio 1's launch.

In December 2018, "Bohemian Rhapsody" officially became the most-streamed song from the 20th century, surpassing Nirvana's "Smells Like Teen Spirit" and Guns N' Roses' "Sweet Child o' Mine". "Bohemian Rhapsody" also became the most-streamed classic rock song of all time. The number of downloads of the song and original video exceeded 1.6 billion downloads across global on-demand streaming services. The video surpassed one billion views on YouTube in July 2019, making it the oldest music video to reach one billion on the platform, and the first pre-1990s song to reach that figure.

In 2022, the single was selected by the U.S. Library of Congress for preservation in the National Recording Registry as being "culturally, historically, or aesthetically significant."

==== Polls ====
In a 2001 poll of more than 50,000 readers of The Observer newspaper and viewers of British TV's Channel 4 for the 100 best number-one singles of all time, the song came second to John Lennon's "Imagine". In a 2002 poll of more than 31,000 people conducted for Guinness World Records' British Hit Singles, "Bohemian Rhapsody" was voted Britain's favourite single, beating Lennon's "Imagine" to the top spot. In 2002, it came in 10th in a BBC World Service poll to find the world's favourite song.

In the Netherlands, Bohemian Rhapsody has been in the top five of the annual year's end "Top 100 Aller Tijden" ("All-Time Top 100 [Singles]") since 1977, topping the list eight times, more than any other artists. Since 1999, the Dutch "Top 2000" pop music poll supplanted the Top-100, to list and play the 2,000 all-time greatest songs annually in December, and the song has been ranked first in all but five years (2005, 2010, 2014, 2015 and 2020, when it was runner up).

In a 2012 readers poll conducted by Rolling Stone magazine, "Bohemian Rhapsody" was voted the best vocal performance in rock history. In 2010, the song ranked at 166 on Rolling Stone's "500 Greatest Songs of All Time" list, and was re-ranked at number 17 in 2021.

In 2012, the song topped an ITV poll in the UK to find "The Nation's Favourite Number One" over 60 years of music, ahead of Michael Jackson's "Billie Jean" (number two), Adele's "Someone like You" (number three), Oasis' "Don't Look Back in Anger" (number four) and The Beatles' "Hey Jude" (number five). The song was also ranked number five in RadioMafia's list of "Top 500 Songs".

=== Cover versions ===
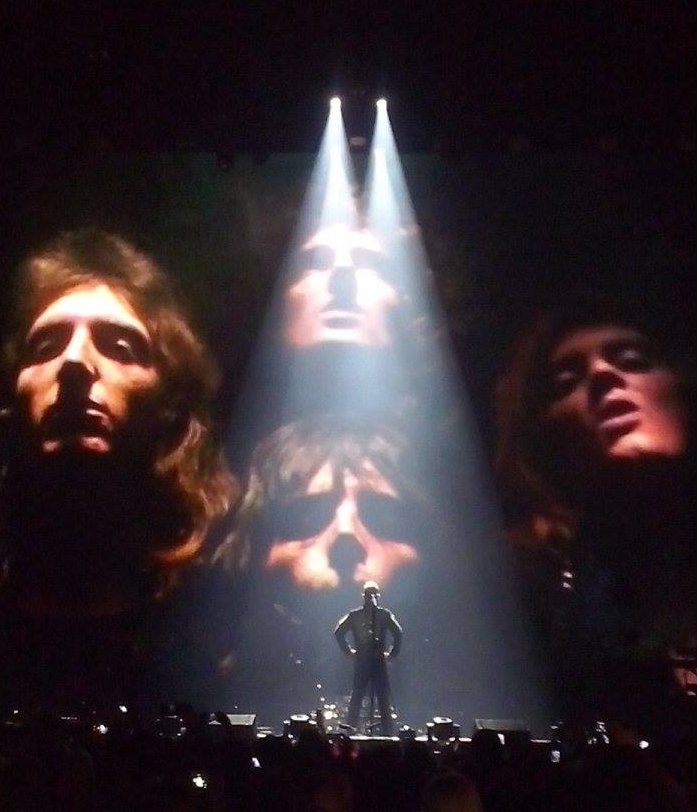
Robbie Williams on stage in Poland in 2015 performing the song with the Queen image in the background

Over two dozen artists have recorded or performed cover versions of "Bohemian Rhapsody", including charted single releases by:

- Bad News – a 1986 spoof version produced by Brian May which reached UK number 44
- The Braids – an R&B version recorded for the soundtrack to the 1996 film High School High and which peaked at UK number 21, US number 42, and Canada number 13
- Panic! at the Disco – a version recorded for the soundtrack of the 2016 film Suicide Squad and which peaked at UK number 80, US number 64 and Canada number 47

A video cover featuring The Muppets also went viral and was subsequently released as a single in late 2009, peaking at number 32 in the UK.

"Weird Al" Yankovic's 1993 album Alapalooza includes a version of the song entitled "Bohemian Polka", which is a rearrangement of the entire song as a polka.

=== 40th anniversary ===
To mark the 40th anniversary of "Bohemian Rhapsody", the song was released on a limited edition 12" vinyl with the original B-side "I'm In Love With My Car" on 27 November 2015 for Record Store Day 2015. Queen also released A Night At The Odeon, Live At Hammersmith 75, on CD, DVD-Video and Blu-ray. This includes the first live "professionally" recorded performance of "Bohemian Rhapsody". However, the first recording and live performance of "Bohemian Rhapsody" was the performance on 14 November 1975 in Liverpool.

=== Auction ===
From 4 August to 5 September 2023, the Freddie Mercury: A World of His Own exhibition was held at Sotheby's in New Bond Street, London where almost 1,500 items of Mercury's went on display before being sold across six auctions. His Yamaha baby grand piano, which he used to compose "Bohemian Rhapsody", sold for £1.7 million, while his handwritten lyrics for the song went for £1.38 million. A silver snake bangle worn by Mercury in the "Bohemian Rhapsody" music video was sold for £698,500.

=== Zulu translation ===
In 2025, a translation of "Bohemian Rhapsody" into Zulu language was authorized by surviving members of Queen and the Mercury Phoenix Trust. The Zulu version is performed by the Ndlovu Youth Choir under artistic director Ralf Schmitt, and combines isicathamiya (an a capella style) with kwassa kwassa (a type of music and dance from the Democratic Republic of Congo).

=== 50th Anniversary ===
On 13 September 2025, Brian May and Roger Taylor performed at the Last Night of the Proms, joining the BBC Symphony Orchestra and Chorus, BBC Singers and National Youth Choir for a new orchestral arrangement of "Bohemian Rhapsody", by Stuart Morley, marking the 50th anniversary of the song.

== Live performances ==
"Bohemian Rhapsody" live at Milton Keynes Bowl (1982)
In live performances, the operatic segment would be played from tape as it was too complicated for the band to perform live. As the heavy rock segment followed, the band would return to the stage.

The a cappella opening was too complex to perform live, so Mercury tried various ways of introducing the song. When "Mustapha" became a live favourite, Mercury would often sub in that song's a cappella opening, which was easier to reproduce live as it was only one voice—this combination features in their 1979 live album Live Killers. During their 1982 Hot Space Tour, and occasionally at other times, Mercury would do a piano improvisation (generally the introduction to "Death on Two Legs") that ended with the first notes of the song. Often, the preceding song would end, and Mercury would sit at the piano, say a quick word, and start playing the ballad section. At Live Aid where "Bohemian Rhapsody" was their opening song, Mercury commenced with the ballad section.

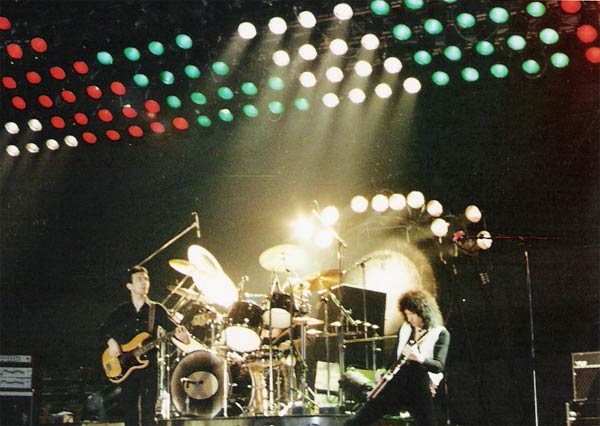
From left to right: Deacon, Taylor and May in concert in Hanover in 1979. Behind the drum kit is the tam-tam used at the end of "Bohemian Rhapsody".

Initially following the song's release, the operatic middle section proved a problem for the band. Because of extensive multi-tracking, it could not be performed on stage. The band did not have enough of a break between the Sheer Heart Attack and A Night at the Opera tours to find a way to make it work live, so they split the song into three sections that were played throughout the night. At the beginning of the show, the operatic section from the album would be played from tape as the introduction to the setlist. During this playback, Mercury would appear briefly to sing live for the line, "I see a little sillhouetto of a man", standing behind a white sheet, in silhouette. As the song segued into the hard rock section, the band would emerge on the smoke-filled stage—the playback would end at this point, and the hard rock section would be performed live (without the final ballad section, which appeared later in the set), before transitioning into the following song, "Ogre Battle". This entire segment would be omitted for the band's Christmas Eve 1975 broadcast at the Hammersmith Odeon, instead being replaced by "Now I'm Here". The opening and closing ballads were played as part of a medley, with "Killer Queen" and "March of the Black Queen" taking the place of the operatic and hard rock sections. For the band's short "Summer of '76" tour where the same medley was played, it would be immediately preceded by "You're My Best Friend".

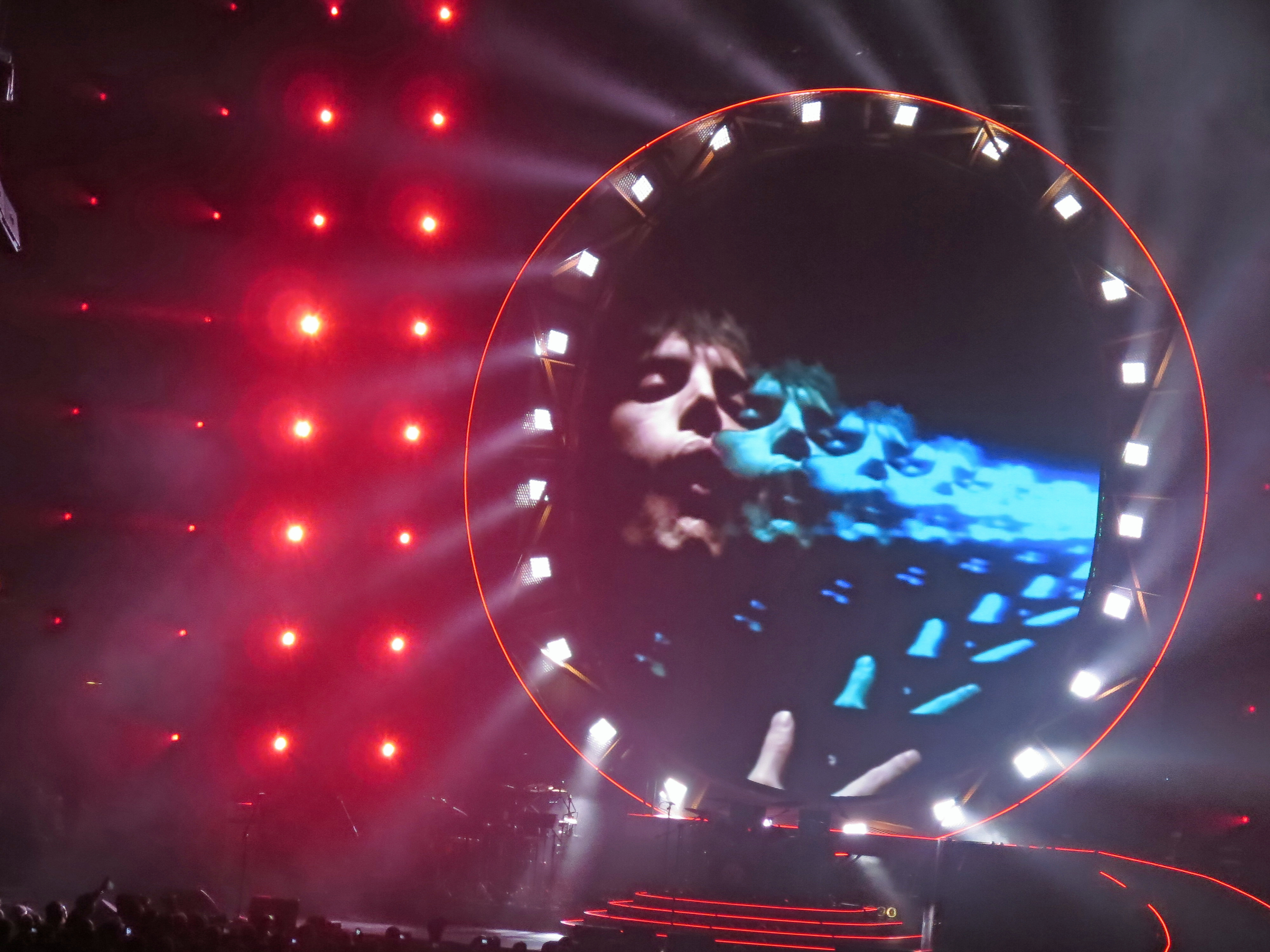
Footage of Mercury singing "Magnifico" in the operatic section of the "Bohemian Rhapsody" music video during a Queen + Adam Lambert concert at the United Center, Chicago, June 2014.

Starting with the "A Day at the Races Tour" in 1977, the band adopted their lasting way of playing the song live. The opening ballad would be played on stage, and after May's guitar solo, the lights would go down, the band would leave the stage, and the operatic section would be played from tape, while coloured stage lights provided a light show based around the voices of the opera section. Some playings of the opera section from the tape would often be accompanied by a portion of the song's music video containing the footage used for the operatic portion of the song, as seen at the Earl's Court shows from the end of the A Day At The Races Tour. A blast of pyrotechnics after Taylor's high note on the final "for me" would announce the band's return for the hard rock section and closing ballad. Queen played the song in this form all through the Magic Tour of 1986. This style was also used for the Freddie Mercury Tribute Concert, with Elton John singing the opening ballad and then after the taped operatic section, Axl Rose singing the hard rock section. John and Rose sang the closing ballad part together in a duet.

"Bohemian Rhapsody" was performed by Queen + Paul Rodgers throughout their tours, accompanied by a video of Mercury. Footage from the Live at Wembley '86 was used for the 2005–06 tour, and the 1981 Montreal performance used for the Rock the Cosmos Tour. As with the Queen tours, the band went backstage for the operatic section, which was accompanied by a video tribute to Freddie Mercury. When the hard rock section began, the lights came back up to the full band on stage, including Rodgers, who took over lead vocals. Rodgers duetted with the recording of Mercury for the "outro" section, allowing the audience to sing the final "Nothing really matters to me", while the taped Mercury took a bow for the crowd. Rodgers would then repeat the line, and the final line ("Any way the wind blows") was delivered with one last shot of Mercury smiling at the audience. Commenting upon this staging, Brian May says that they "had to rise to the challenge of getting Freddie in there in a way which gave him his rightful place, but without demeaning Paul in any way. It also kept us live and 'present', although conscious and proud of our past, as we logically should be."

Since 2012, May and Taylor have toured with former American Idol contestant Adam Lambert under the name Queen + Adam Lambert (following two one-off performances together in 2009 and 2011), with "Bohemian Rhapsody" regularly included at the end of their set.

== Charts ==
=== Weekly charts ===
Chart (1975–1976)	Peak position
Australia (Kent Music Report)	1
Belgium (Ultratop 50 Flanders)	1
Belgium (Ultratop 50 Wallonia)	7
Canada Top Singles (RPM)	1
Finland (Suomen Virallinen)	10
Ireland (IRMA)	1
Italy (TV Sorrisi e Canzoni)	28
Netherlands (Dutch Top 40)	1
Netherlands (Single Top 100)	1
New Zealand (Recorded Music NZ)	1
Norway (VG-lista)	4
South Africa (Springbok Radio)	2
Spain (AFE)	4
Sweden (Sverigetopplistan)	18
Switzerland (Schweizer Hitparade)	4
UK Singles (Official Charts)	1
US Billboard Hot 100	9
US Cash Box Top 100	6
West Germany (GfK)	7

Chart (1991–1992)	Peak position
Australia (ARIA)	5
Austria (Ö3 Austria Top 40)	8
Belgium (Ultratop 50 Flanders)	6
Canada Top Singles (RPM)	18
Canada Adult Contemporary (RPM)	36
Denmark (IFPI)	3
Europe (Eurochart Hot 100)	3
Finland (Suomen virallinen lista)	17
France (SNEP)	15
Germany (GfK) with "These Are the Days of Our Lives"	16
Ireland (IRMA) with "These Are the Days of Our Lives"	1
Netherlands (Dutch Top 40)	2
Netherlands (Single Top 100)	1
New Zealand (Recorded Music NZ)	16
Switzerland (Schweizer Hitparade)	8
UK Singles (Official Charts) with "These Are the Days of Our Lives"	1
UK Airplay (Music Week)	30
US Billboard Hot 100	2
US Cash Box Top 100	1

Chart (2018–2019)	Peak position
Australia (ARIA)	17
Austria (Ö3 Austria Top 40)	30
Belgium (Ultratop 50 Flanders)	3
Czech Republic Singles Digital (ČNS IFPI)	1
Canada Hot 100 (Billboard)	26
Canadian Digital Song Sales	6
Colombia (Promúsica)	12
France (SNEP Singles Téléchargés)	3
France (SNEP Megafusion)	21
France (SNEP Streaming)	27
Greece International Digital Singles (IFPI)	8
Hungary (Single Top 40)	4
Hungary (Stream Top 40)	3
Italy (FIMI)	10
Japan Hot 100 (Billboard)	11
Lithuania (AGATA)	4
Malaysia (RIM)	8
Netherlands (Single Top 100)	26
New Zealand (Recorded Music NZ)	20
Portugal (AFP)	21
Slovakia Singles Digital (ČNS IFPI)	5
Singapore (RIAS)	24
Spain (Promusicae)	26
Sweden (Sverigetopplistan)	33
Switzerland (Schweizer Hitparade)	21
UK Singles (Official Charts)	45
US Billboard Hot 100	33
US Hot Rock & Alternative Songs (Billboard)	2

Chart (2020–2022)	Peak position
Global 200 (Billboard)	97

=== Year-end charts ===
Chart (1975)	Position
UK Singles (BMRB)	22

Chart (1976)	Position
Australia (Kent Music Report)	2
Belgium (Ultratop Flanders)	14
Canada RPM Top 100	6
Netherlands (Dutch Top 40)	9
Netherlands (Single Top 100)	11
UK Singles (BMRB)	35
US Billboard Hot 100	18
US Cash Box Top 100	52

Chart (1991)	Position
UK Singles (Gallup)	2

Chart (1992)	Position
Australia (ARIA)	59
Belgium (Ultratop)	45
Brazil (Crowley)	66
Europe (Eurochart Hot 100)	34
Netherlands (Dutch Top 40)	28
Netherlands (Single Top 100)	24
New Zealand (RIANZ)	41
UK Singles (Gallup)	15
US Billboard Hot 100	39
US Cash Box Singles	22

Chart (2006)	Position
UK Singles (OCC)	199

Chart (2018)	Position
France (SNEP)	146
Hungary (Single Top 40)	40
Iceland (Tónlistinn)	97
Portugal (AFP)	122
US Hot Rock Songs (Billboard)	31

Chart (2019)	Position
Australia (ARIA)	67
Czech Albums (ČNS IFPI)	7
France (SNEP)	60
Hungary (Single Top 40)	29
Italy (FIMI)	73
Japan (Japan Hot 100)	49
Latvia (LAIPA)	75
Portugal (AFP)	79
Sweden (Sverigetopplistan)	95
Switzerland (Schweizer Hitparade)	39
Tokyo (Tokio Hot 100)	66
UK Singles (OCC)	64
US Hot Rock Songs (Billboard)	7
US Rolling Stone Top 100	67

Chart (2020)	Position
France (SNEP)	158

Chart (2021)	Position
France (SNEP)	177
Global 200 (Billboard)	87
Portugal (AFP)	146

Chart (2022)	Position
Global 200 (Billboard)	75

=== Decade-end charts ===
Chart (1970–1979)	Position
UK Singles (OCC)	7

=== All-time charts ===
Chart (2018)	Position
UK Singles (OCC)	3

== Certifications ==
Region	Certification	Certified units/sales
Australia (ARIA)	8× Platinum	560,000^{‡}
Brazil (Pro-Música Brasil)	Platinum	60,000^{‡}
Canada (Music Canada)	7× Platinum	560,000^{‡}
Denmark (IFPI Danmark)	3× Platinum	270,000^{‡}
Germany (BVMI)	2× Platinum	1,200,000^{‡}
Italy (FIMI)	5× Platinum	500,000^{‡}
Japan (RIAJ)	Gold	100,000^{*}
New Zealand (RMNZ)	9× Platinum	270,000^{‡}
Portugal (AFP)	4× Platinum	160,000^{‡}
Spain (Promusicae)	5× Platinum	300,000^{‡}
United Kingdom (BPI) Physical sales in 1991	Platinum	600,000^{^}
United Kingdom (BPI) Digital sales + streaming	6× Platinum	3,600,000^{‡}
United States (RIAA) Physical sales	Gold	1,000,000^{^}
United States (RIAA) Digital sales + streaming	Diamond	10,000,000^{‡}
Streaming
Greece (IFPI Greece)	Platinum	2,000,000^{†}
Japan (RIAJ)	Gold	50,000,000^{†}
^{*} Sales figures based on certification alone.^{^} Shipments figures based on certification alone.^{‡} Sales+streaming figures based on certification alone.^{†} Streaming-only figures based on certification alone.

== Queen comments on the song ==
I always wanted to do something operatic. I wanted something with a mood setter at the start, going into a rock type of thing which completely breaks off into an opera section, a vicious twist and then returns to the theme. I don't really know anything about opera myself. Just certain pieces. I wanted to create what I thought Queen could do. It's not authentic... certainly not. It's no sort of pinch out of Magic Flute. It was as far as my limited capacity could take me.

— Freddie Mercury, 1976

I'm going to shatter some illusions, it was just one of those pieces I wrote for the album: just writing my batch of songs. In its early stages I almost rejected it, but then it grew. We started deciding on a single about halfway through. There were a few contenders—we were thinking of "The Prophet's Song" at one point—but then "Bohemian Rhapsody" seemed the one. There was a time when the others wanted to chop it around a bit, but I refused. If it was going to be released, it would be in its entirety. We knew it was very risky, but we had so much confidence in that song—I did anyway. I felt, underneath it all, that if it was successful it would earn a lot of respect. People were all going, You're joking, they'll never play it, you'll only hear the first few bars and then they'll fade it out. We had numerous rows. EMI were shocked—a six-minute single? You must be joking! The same in America—oh, you just got away with it in Britain.

— Freddie Mercury, 1976

When we finished the album, the Night at the Opera album, that was the track on it that we thought we were gonna release as a single in the UK first. And when we released it in Britain we didn't necessarily think it'd be released in America, cause we know even over here, you know, the AM tastes are even more [hesitates] stricter. Anyway we did have thoughts about even in the UK, perhaps editing it down at all, but we listened to it over and over again and there was no way we could edit it. We tried a few ideas, but if you edited it, you always lost some part of the song, so we had to leave it all in. And luckily it took off anyway.

— John Deacon, 1977

The vocal harmonies was something we wanted to do from the beginning, as we are always keen to do that kind of thing. We wanted to be a group that could do the heaviness of hard rock, but also have harmonies swooping around all over the place. We thought there was some real power and emotion in that combination. The guitar solo was pretty much off the cuff, except I think I had plenty of time to think about that one. I remember playing along with it in the studio for a while when other things were being done. I knew what kind of melody I wanted to play.

— Brian May, 1982

== Personnel ==
- Freddie Mercury – lead and backing vocals, piano, operatic vocals (middle register)
- Brian May – electric guitar, operatic vocals (low register)
- Roger Taylor – drums, timpani, gong, operatic vocals (high register)
- John Deacon – bass guitar

== See also ==
- List of Bohemian Rhapsody cover versions
- List of best-selling singles
- List of best-selling singles in the United Kingdom
- List of highest-certified digital singles in the United States

== General references ==
- Hodkinson, Mark (2004). Queen: The Early Years. Music Sales Ltd. ISBN 1-84449-012-2.
- Pope, Rob (2002). The English Studies Book: An Introduction to Language, Literature and Culture. Routledge. ISBN 0-415-25709-3.
- "Smashed Hits: What is a Bohemian Rhapsody?". BBC News. 15 June 2011.
- Corn, John (2005). Britain Since 1948. Folens Publishers. ISBN 1-84303-985-0.
- Heatley, Michael (2008). Massive Music Moments. Collins and Brown. ISBN 978-1-84340-493-4.
- Directed by Carl Johnston (4 December 2004). The Story of Bohemian Rhapsody (Television production). BBC.
- Peraino, Judith (2005). Listening to the Sirens: Musical Technologies of Queer Identity from Homer to Hedwig. University of California Press. ISBN 0-520-21587-7.
- Chiu, David (27 December 2005). "Unconventional Queen Hit Still Rocks After 30 Years". The New York Times.
- Allen, Nick (3 December 2009). "Muppets' Bohemian Rhapsody takes YouTube by storm". The Daily Telegraph. London. Archived from the original on 11 January 2022.
- Davis, Andy (1993). "Queen's Bohemian Rhapsody". Record Collector (167): 20.
- Black, Johnny (2002). "The Greatest Songs Ever! Bohemian Rhapsody". Blender. Archived from the original on 25 January 2010.
- "Queen album brings rock to Iran". BBC News. 24 August 2004.
- Gracyk, Theodore (2007). Listening to Popular Music: Or, How I Learned to Stop Worrying and Love Led Zeppelin. University of Michigan Press. ISBN 978-0-472-06983-5.
- "Grammy Hall of Fame Award". Grammy.com. 2004. Archived from the original on 24 December 2010.
- "Most Played Song On British Radio". ClashMusic.com. 2009.
- Cunningham, Mark (October 1995). "Roy Thomas Baker & Gary Langan: The Making Of Queen's 'Bohemian Rhapsody'". SoundOnSound.com. Future Plc.
- Directed by Matthew Longfellow (21 March 2006). A Making of 'A Night at the Opera' (DVD). Classic Albums.
- "500 Greatest Songs of All Time". Rolling Stone. 2004. Archived from the original on 23 March 2013.
- "Irish song voted world's favourite". BBC News. 20 December 2002.
- "Top 100 Aller Tijden". Radio Veronica. Archived from the original on 13 July 2012.
- Buckley, Peter (2003). The Rough Guide to Rock. Rough Guides. ISBN 1-85828-457-0.
- Whiteley, Sheila (2006). Queering the Popular Pitch. Routledge. ISBN 0-415-97805-X.
- "Press Release: Queen + The Muppets Single". BrianMay.com. 2009. Archived from the original on 7 August 2013.
- "Bohemian Rhapsody". BBC Radio 2. April 2005.
- "Queen: inducted in 2001". Rock and Roll Hall of Fame.
- Chael, David (13 October 2008). "Review: Queen and Paul Rodgers on tour". The Daily Telegraph. London. Archived from the original on 11 January 2022.
- "Bohemian Rhapsody Chart Entries". Tsort.info.
