= Liar (Queen song) =

- A-side label for the US vinyl single

Single by Queen

from the album Queen
- B-side: "Doing All Right"
- Released: 14 February 1974
- Recorded: December 1971; June–November 1972
- Studio: Trident Studios, London
- Genre: Hard rock; progressive rock; heavy metal
- Length: 6:24 (album version); 3:01 (single version)
- Label: Elektra
- Songwriter: Freddie Mercury
- Producers: John Anthony; Roy Thomas Baker; Queen

Queen singles chronology
"Keep Yourself Alive" (1973)	"Liar" (1974)	"Seven Seas of Rhye" (1974)

Music video
- "Liar" on YouTube

"Liar" is a song by the British rock band Queen, written by the lead singer Freddie Mercury in 1970. The song featured on the band's 1973 debut album Queen. A heavily truncated version of "Liar" was released as a single – backed with "Doing All Right" – in the United States and New Zealand by Elektra Records in February 1974.

The music video consisted of the band miming to the song on a sound stage. "Liar" was the band's second videoclip and it was filmed one year before it was released as a single.

This is one of three Queen tracks, the others being "Now I'm Here" and "Under Pressure" (their collaboration originally with David Bowie), to feature a Hammond organ.

== Composition ==
This song makes use of the flanging effect, especially on the drums and cowbell. This is also the longest song on the album. John Deacon played a bass solo during the instrumental passage.

== Reception ==
Cash Box called it a "top flight, tightly delivered rocker" with an accent on "bass and lead guitar with energetic lead vocal and harmony performances."

== Personnel ==
- Freddie Mercury – lead and backing vocals, Hammond organ
- Brian May – acoustic and electric guitars, backing vocals
- Roger Taylor – drums, woodblock, cowbell, backing vocals
- John Deacon – bass guitar

== Track listing ==
1. "Liar" (Freddie Mercury) – 3:03
2. "Doing All Right" (Brian May, Tim Staffell) – 4:09

== Appearances ==
- Queen (1973)
- At the Beeb (1989)
- Live at the Rainbow '74 (2014)
- A Night at the Odeon – Hammersmith 1975 (2015)
- On Air (2016)

== Legacy/cover versions ==
Comedy heavy metal band Bad News used the opening riff and other song structures in their song "Hey, Hey, Bad News". Brian May produced their self-titled album and played on their cover of "Bohemian Rhapsody" from the same album.
