= Keep Yourself Alive =

1973 single by Queen

- 2011 US reissue picture sleeve

Single by Queen

from the album Queen
- B-side: "Son and Daughter"
- Released: 6 July 1973 (UK); 9 October 1973 (US)
- Recorded: June–November 1972 at Trident Studios
- Genre: Hard rock; progressive rock; power pop
- Length: 3:47
- Label: EMI (UK); Elektra (US)
- Songwriter: Brian May
- Producers: John Anthony; Roy Thomas Baker; Queen

Queen singles chronology
"Keep Yourself Alive" (1973)	"Liar" (1974)

Music video
- "Keep Yourself Alive" on YouTube

"Keep Yourself Alive" is the debut single by the British rock band Queen. Written by guitarist Brian May, it is the opening track on the band's self-titled debut album (1973). It was released as Queen's first single along with "Son and Daughter" as the B-side.

"Keep Yourself Alive" was largely ignored upon its release and failed to chart on either side of the Atlantic. In July 1975 the song was re-released in the US backed with "Lily of the Valley" and "God Save the Queen".

In 2008, Rolling Stone rated the song 31st on its list of "The 100 Greatest Guitar Songs of All Time".

== Writing and recording ==
According to Mark Hodkinson, author of Queen: The Early Years, "Keep Yourself Alive" was conceived on acoustic guitars during Queen's practice sessions at Imperial College and the garden at Ferry Road in 1970. At the time, Queen had not yet found a permanent bassist; the group consisted of lead singer Freddie Mercury, guitarist Brian May, and drummer Roger Taylor. In a radio special about their 1977 album News of the World, May said he had penned the lyrics thinking them ironic and tongue-in-cheek, but their sense was completely changed when Mercury sang them.

The first version of "Keep Yourself Alive" was recorded in December 1971 at De Lane Lea Studios. It was produced by Louie Austin and includes the intro played on Brian May's Hallfredh acoustic guitar. All of the song elements were already present, including Mercury's call-and-response vocals (verses) and during the break, where Taylor sang a line and May answered it. This demo version remains May's personal favourite take of the song.

They subsequently made several attempts to "recapture the magic" when they went on to capture the "real" version at the Trident Studios. The version mixed by Mike Stone was the only one considered moderately acceptable by the band, and was the one deemed fit to release as a single. This version includes Mercury doing all of the harmony vocals in the chorus (multi-tracking himself) and May singing the "two steps nearer to my grave" line instead of Mercury (who did it in earlier versions and would often do so live).

== Release and reception ==
EMI Records released "Keep Yourself Alive" as a single in the United Kingdom on 6 July 1973, a week before Queen hit the stores. A few months later, on 9 October 1973, Elektra Records released the single in the United States. However, "Keep Yourself Alive" received little radio airplay and was largely ignored on both sides of the Atlantic; it failed to chart in either the UK or the US. According to Queen biographer Mark Hodkinson, "[o]n five separate occasions EMI's pluggers attempted to secure it space on [Britain's Radio 1] play list", yet they were denied each time – reportedly because the record took "too long to happen". "Keep Yourself Alive" is the only Queen single not to have charted in the UK.

The single received mixed reviews from the British music press. New Musical Express praised the "cleanly recorded" song, as well as the "good singer", and quipped that if Queen "look half as good as they sound, they could be huge". The reviewer for Melody Maker felt that Queen made "an impressive debut with a heavily phased guitar intro and energetic vocal attack"; however, he thought the song unoriginal, and unlikely to become a hit. On the other hand, Disc magazine's critic believed the single "should do well". The review praised "Keep Yourself Alive"'s drum solo, as well as its "attractively stilted, vaguely Hendrix-y lead riff". The South Yorkshire Times rated the single as "good"; the newspaper predicted that "[i]f this debut sound from Queen is anything to go by, they should make very interesting listening in the future." In his album review of Queen for Rolling Stone, Gordon Fletcher hailed "Keep Yourself Alive" as "a truly awesome move for the jugular."

Retrospectively, "Keep Yourself Alive" is cited as the highlight of Queen's debut album. Stephen Thomas Erlewine of Allmusic wrote that while Queen "too often... plays like a succession of ideas instead of succinct songs", "[t]here is an exception to that rule — the wild, rampaging opener 'Keep Yourself Alive' – one of their very best songs." In 2008, Rolling Stone rated the song 31st on its list of "The 100 Greatest Guitar Songs of All Time". The magazine dubbed "Keep Yourself Alive" as "Brian May's statement of purpose: a phalanx of overdubbed guitars crying out in unison, with rhythm and texture from over-the-top effects...an entire album's worth of riffs crammed into a single song."

== Personnel ==
- Freddie Mercury – lead and backing vocals, tambourine (live performances)
- Brian May – guitars, lead vocals on middle eight, backing vocals
- Roger Taylor – drums, percussion, tambourine, cowbell, lead vocals on middle eight, backing vocals
- John Deacon – bass guitar

== Track listing ==
All songs written by Brian May, except where noted.

1973 UK 7" single

1. "Keep Yourself Alive" – 3:47
2. "Son and Daughter" – 3:20

1974 Australian 7" single

1. "Keep Yourself Alive" – 3:47
2. "Son and Daughter" (censored) – 3:12

1975 US 7" single reissue

1. "Keep Yourself Alive" – 3:29
2. "Lily of the Valley (Freddie Mercury) – 1:35
3. "God Save the Queen (traditional, arr. May) – 1:15

== Certifications ==
Certifications for "Keep Yourself Alive"
Region	Certification	Certified units/sales
Brazil (Pro-Música Brasil)	Gold	30,000^{‡}
^{‡} Sales+streaming figures based on certification alone.
