= Queen (Queen album) =

1973 debut studio album by Queen

Studio album by Queen
- Released: 13 July 1973
- Recorded: December 1971 – January 1972 (demo sessions); April – 30 July 1972
- Studios: De Lane Lea (London); Trident (London)
- Genres: Hard rock; heavy metal; progressive rock
- Length: 38:42
- Labels: EMI; Elektra
- Producers: John Anthony; Roy Thomas Baker; Queen

Queen chronology
Queen (1973)	Queen II (1974)

Singles from Queen
- 1. "Keep Yourself Alive" Released: 6 July 1973; 2. "Liar" Released: 14 February 1974

Queen is the debut studio album by the British rock band Queen. Released on 13 July 1973 by EMI Records in the UK and on 4 September 1973 by Elektra Records in the US, it was recorded at Trident Studios and De Lane Lea Music Centre, London, with production by Roy Thomas Baker, John Anthony and the band members themselves.

The album combines heavy metal and progressive rock with a folk influence. The lyrics are based on a variety of topics, including folklore ("My Fairy King") and religion ("Jesus"). Lead singer Freddie Mercury wrote five of the ten tracks, lead guitarist Brian May wrote four songs (including "Doing All Right", which he co-wrote with Tim Staffell while in the band Smile), and drummer Roger Taylor both wrote and sang "Modern Times Rock and Roll". The final song on the album is a short instrumental version of "Seven Seas of Rhye", the full version of which would appear on the band's second album, Queen II.

The album was rereleased as a remixed, remastered and expanded box set entitled Queen I Collector's Edition on 25 October 2024.

== Background ==
Queen, who played their first gig in the City Hall of Truro on 27 June 1970, had been playing the club and college circuit in and around London for almost two years when they were asked to test out the new recording facilities at De Lane Lea Studios. The band came away with a polished demo tape of five songs: "Keep Yourself Alive", "The Night Comes Down", "Great King Rat", "Jesus", and "Liar". The group sent their demo to various record labels, but received only one offer: a low bid from Charisma Records, which they declined as, according to their friend Ken Testi, they feared they "would always play second fiddle to Genesis and those other bands".

Producers John Anthony and Roy Thomas Baker visited De Lane Lea while the band were recording and were impressed by what they saw. They recommended Queen to Barry and Norman Sheffield, who owned Trident Studios. The Sheffield brothers arranged for Queen to record at Trident; however, because the studio was very popular, Queen mainly recorded during studio downtime but were given free use of everything after the paying artists had left, including the latest technologies and production team. Trident also agreed to oversee the group's management, recording and publishing interests while they sought a record deal. One day, while waiting to use the studio, Freddie Mercury was asked to record vocals by producer Robin Geoffrey Cable, who was working on a version of "I Can Hear Music" and "Goin' Back". Mercury enlisted May and Taylor on the tracks, which were released on a single under the name Larry Lurex, a parody of Gary Glitter. (Note: Queen would later enlist Cable to produce the "Wall of Sound" technique on "Funny How Love Is" for the band's next album, Queen II (1974).)

== Recording ==
The process of recording only during studio downtime—late evenings or overnight—lasted from April to July 1972. Roger Taylor recalled, "You could see the working girls at night through their laced curtains, so while we were mixing, we would have a little bit of diversion". The limitations of this arrangement led the band to focus on completing one track at a time, but problems arose almost immediately. The band had thought highly of their De Lane Lea demo tracks, but producer Roy Thomas Baker had them re-record the songs with better equipment. "Keep Yourself Alive" was the first song to be re-recorded, and Queen did not like the result. They recorded it again, but no mix met their standards. After seven or eight failed attempts, engineer Mike Stone stepped in, and his first try met with Queen's approval. Stone would stay on to engineer and eventually co-produce their next five albums. May later commented that "Between Roy [Thomas Baker] and I, we were fighting the whole time to find a place where we had the perfection but also the reality of performance and sound".

Another track that proved problematic was "Mad the Swine", which was to be the fourth track on the album between "Great King Rat" and "My Fairy King". Baker and Queen disagreed over the drum sound and percussion, and it was left off the album.

Other songs recorded in this period are "Polar Bear" (an old Smile song by May & Staffell) and "Now That I'm Here" (also by May, later reworked into "Feelings, Feelings" for the News of the World sessions). Other unconfirmed songs claimed to have been recorded during these sessions are "Hangman" (alternatively "Waiting for the Hangman" or "Hangman Blues") by Mercury, and "Rock'n'Roll Medley" (a medley of covers including "Jailhouse Rock") and "Silver Salmon" by Staffell, (also confirmed to have also been recorded during the News of the World sessions, in the summer of 1977).

== Songs ==
=== Overview ===
The music on Queen has been described as hard rock, progressive rock and heavy metal. The album's lyrics were reflective of "mystical sword 'n' sorcerers themes" with "medieval landscapes". Michael Gallucci of Ultimate Classic Rock noted how "mostly Queen is a product of its time, bringing together prog, metal and even a little bit of folk music" and felt that the album "did little to separate the group from others exploring similar territory in the early '70s." David Chiu of Medium wrote that Mercury's songs were similar in style to the works of J. R. R. Tolkien, whereas Brian May's songs "were also baroque-sounding at times, albeit more introspective."

=== Side one ===
==== "Keep Yourself Alive" ====
Brian May wrote "Keep Yourself Alive" after the band had been formed but before John Deacon joined, as confirmed by former bass player Barry Mitchell. According to May in a radio special about their 1977 album, News of the World, he had penned the lyrics thinking of them as ironic and tongue-in-cheek, but their sense was completely changed when Mercury sang them. Taylor and May sing the vocal bridge of the song.

==== "Doing All Right" ====
"Doing All Right" was written by Brian May and Tim Staffell while in Smile, but was never released by Smile. This is one of the few Queen songs to feature May on the piano. He also played his old Hallfredh acoustic guitar on this track, and on later tracks such as "White Queen (As It Began)" and "Jealousy". The band played this song as early as 1970, and was the band's first song that Mercury played live on the piano. Staffell sang it when it was a Smile song, and Mercury tried to sing in the same manner when it became a Queen song.

==== "Great King Rat" ====
This song, written by Freddie Mercury, is an example of Queen's earliest sound, with lengthy, heavy compositions, long guitar solos, and sudden tempo changes.

==== "My Fairy King" ====
"My Fairy King", written by Freddie Mercury, deals with Rhye, a fantasy world he created with his younger sister and which features in other Queen songs, most notably "Seven Seas of Rhye". Mercury borrowed some lines from Robert Browning's poem "The Pied Piper of Hamelin". The song was written while the band were in the studio, and contains many vocal overdubbed harmonies, which Mercury was fond of. Roger Taylor also displays his high vocal range, hitting the highest notes in the composition.

Brian May said that after the lyric "Mother Mercury, look what they've done to me" was written, Mercury claimed he was singing about his own mother. Subsequently, Freddie Bulsara took the stage name Freddie Mercury. This was another attempt to separate him from his stage persona. As Mercury once explained, "When I'm performing I'm an extrovert, yet inside I'm a completely different man."

"My Fairy King" is the first song on the album to feature Mercury's piano playing. The piano on "Doing All Right" was played by May, who was quite impressed by Mercury's piano playing on the track. From this point on Mercury handled most of Queen's piano parts.

=== Side two ===
==== "Liar" ====
Originally titled "Lover," the rudiments of this song were written by Freddie Mercury and guitarist Mike Bersin from Mercury's earlier group, Ibex. Queen reworked it, and Mercury took full credit since he had written the lyrics. As mentioned on the transcription on EMI Music Publishing's Off the Record sheet music, this is one of the band's few 1970s tracks to feature a Hammond organ.

==== "The Night Comes Down" ====
Brian May wrote this song shortly after the band's formation in 1970, following the break-up of Smile. It was first recorded at De Lane Lea Studios in January 1972, when the band were hired to test the studio's new equipment in exchange for being allowed to record proper demos for their attempt to find a label.

In 1972, Trident Studios signed Queen to a recording contract, but limited them to work only during studio down-time. They began working with Roy Thomas Baker who, along with owners/management Norman and Barry Sheffield, insisted on re-recording the five De Lane Lea demos. A new version of "The Night Comes Down" was recorded, but the band were unsatisfied with the results and the original demo was used on the album.

The song follows what would become trademark May themes such as coming-of-age, nostalgia over the loss of childhood, and the difficulties of adult life. There is also what could be an ambiguous reference to the Beatles song "Lucy in the Sky with Diamonds", in the lyric: "When I was young it came to me; And I could see the sun breaking; Lucy was high and so was I; Dazzling, holding the world inside."

==== "Modern Times Rock 'n' Roll" ====
Roger Taylor wrote and sang the song, which was re-recorded on two occasions for the BBC. The first dates from December 1973 and was broadcast on John Peel's show. This version was eventually released on the 1989 Queen album At The Beeb, and sounds similar to the album version. The second re-recording dates from April 1974 and was first broadcast on Bob Harris's show.

In the concert versions included in Live at the Rainbow '74, Mercury handled lead vocals.

==== "Son and Daughter" ====
"Son and Daughter" was written by Brian May and was the B-side for the single "Keep Yourself Alive". The song was played in the very first concert under the name of Queen in 1970. It was a regular feature in Queen's live set until well into 1976.

==== "Jesus" ====
The lyrics tell part of the story of Jesus of Nazareth. Freddie Mercury, credited with writing the song, was a Parsi Zoroastrian. The track features a two-chord rhythm section during the verses with a long instrumental break toward the end of the song

==== "Seven Seas of Rhye" ====
Mercury had only half-written "Seven Seas of Rhye" when they were recording the first album. They intended to use it as an outro here and start Queen II with the finished version. This idea was later abandoned, but the song would become Queen's first hit single.

== Release ==
Though the album was completed and fully mixed by 1972, Trident Studios spent months trying to get a record company to release it. After eight months of failing that, they took the initiative and released it themselves in a license deal with EMI Records on 13 July 1973. During this time, Queen had begun writing material for their next album, but they were disheartened by the album's delay, feeling they had grown past that stage, even though the record-buying public was just getting wind of them. They recorded two BBC sessions during the interim. The first single, "Keep Yourself Alive" (the Mike Stone mix, now considered the standard album version), was released a week before the album (UK dates, 6 and 13 July respectively). The US single was issued in October. By mid-January 1974, "Keep Yourself Alive" was getting airplay on U.S. progressive radio stations, according to Radio & Records playlist information printed at the time. All countries had the B-side "Son and Daughter". The album was released in the US on 4 September.

Elektra Records released a single of "Liar" in a heavily edited form on 14 February 1974, with the B-side "Doing All Right". Elektra later reissued the edited version of "Keep Yourself Alive" in July 1975, this time with a double B-side of "Lily of the Valley" and "God Save the Queen". Both versions are different from the album versions.

Hollywood Records released a CD single featuring five versions of "Keep Yourself Alive" to promote the forthcoming Crown Jewels box set (1998). The versions on the CD are "Long Lost Re-take", "BBC Session No. 1 Version", "Live Killers Version", "Album Version (Unremastered)", and "Album Version (1998 Remastered Version)".

== Reception ==
Professional ratings
Review scores
Source	Rating
AllMusic	3/5 stars
Chicago Tribune	2.5/4 stars
Classic Rock	4.5/5 stars
Collector's Guide to Heavy Metal	10/10
Encyclopedia of Popular Music	3/5 stars
MusicHound Rock	3.5/5 stars
Pitchfork Media	6.7/10
PopMatters	7/10
Q	3.5/5 stars

Rolling Stone wrote, "There's no doubt that this funky, energetic English quartet has all the tools they'll need to lay claim to the Zep's abdicated heavy-metal throne, and beyond that to become a truly influential force in the rock world. Their debut album is superb." The Winnipeg Free Press opined that Queen borrowed from other artists, but also compared the album favourably to Led Zeppelin, writing, "the band manages to inject such a fresh, energetic touch to most of it that I don't mind a bit... With its first album, Queen has produced a driving, high energy set which in time may be looked upon with the same reverence Led Zep 1 now receives." Illinois' Daily Herald also commended the record, writing "Good listening is guaranteed in songs like 'Keep Yourself Alive', 'Great King Rat' and 'Doing All Right'."

In later years, AllMusic awarded the album three out of five stars, calling it a "patchy but promising debut from a classic rock group". In 1994, Guitarist Magazine ranked Queen the 19th most influential guitar album of all time. The album placed at number 54 in NME's "100 Greatest Albums You've Never Heard" in 2011. In 2008, Rolling Stone ranked "Keep Yourself Alive" number 31 in the "100 Greatest Guitar Songs of All Time", describing it as "an entire album's worth of riffs crammed into a single song". It has also been cited as heavy metal journalist Martin Popoff's favorite record of all time. In a Chicago Tribune article written by Greg Kot, the album is given a generally positive rating overall, complimenting the band's heavy sound combined with baroque arrangements.

Writing for Classic Rock in 2016, Malcolm Dome ranked Queen as the band's second greatest album. He described it as a "glorious hard rock marathon unlike anything else around at the time", and commented on the "unmistakably unique sound of Brian May's home-made guitar", the "panoramic production of Roy Thomas Baker" and the "soaring voice of Freddie Mercury", adding "the record was just too powerful, too multi-dimensional and too stunning to sit happily and contentedly in the grooves. The performances were all virtuoso."

== Track listing ==
=== Original release ===
All lead vocals by Freddie Mercury unless noted. Roger Taylor was credited as Roger Meddows-Taylor, his full name, but that was discontinued after the next album.

Side one
No.	Title	Writer(s)	Lead vocals	Length
1.	"Keep Yourself Alive"	Brian May	Mercury with Roger Taylor and Brian May	3:45
2.	"Doing All Right"	May; Tim Staffell		4:10
3.	"Great King Rat"	Freddie Mercury		5:41
4.	"My Fairy King"	Mercury		4:07
Total length:				17:43

Side two
No.	Title	Writer(s)	Lead vocals	Length
1.	"Liar"	Mercury		6:24
2.	"The Night Comes Down"	May		4:24
3.	"Modern Times Rock 'n' Roll"	Roger Taylor	Taylor	1:48
4.	"Son and Daughter"	May		3:19
5.	"Jesus"	Mercury		3:45
6.	"Seven Seas of Rhye..." (Instrumental)	Mercury		1:15
Total length:				20:55

Bonus tracks (1991 Hollywood Records reissue)
No.	Title	Writer(s)	Length
11.	"Mad the Swine" (Non-album track, June 1972)	Mercury	3:20
12.	"Keep Yourself Alive" (Long-lost re-take)	May	4:04
13.	"Liar" (1991 bonus remix by John Luongo and Gary Hellman)	Mercury	6:25

=== 2011 Universal Music reissue ===
Disc 2: Bonus EP (2011 Universal Music reissue)
No.	Title	Length
1.	"Keep Yourself Alive" (De Lane Lea Demo, December 1971)	3:51
2.	"The Night Comes Down" (De Lane Lea Demo, December 1971)	4:24
3.	"Great King Rat" (De Lane Lea Demo, December 1971)	6:09
4.	"Jesus" (De Lane Lea Demo, December 1971)	5:06
5.	"Liar" (De Lane Lea Demo, December 1971)	7:54
6.	"Mad the Swine" (June 1972)	3:22

=== iTunes deluxe edition (2011) ===
Bonus videos
No.	Title	Length
1.	"Son and Daughter" (live at the Hammersmith Odeon, 1975)
2.	"Liar" (live at the Rainbow, 1974)
3.	"Keep Yourself Alive" (filmed at St John's Wood Studios, 1973)

== Personnel ==
Personnel taken from Queen liner notes.

Queen

- Freddie Mercury – vocals, piano
- Brian May – guitar, vocals, piano
- John Deacon (credited as Deacon John) – bass guitar
- Roger Taylor (credited as Roger Meddows-Taylor) – drums, percussion, vocals

Additional personnel

- John Anthony – production
- Roy Thomas Baker – production, engineering
- Queen – production
- Mike Stone – engineering
- Ted Sharpe – engineering
- Dave Hentschel – engineering
- Louie Austin – recording on "The Night Comes Down"
- Douglas Puddifoot – photography, design
- Freddie Mercury – design
- Brian May – design

Note

- The band included the comment "and nobody played synthesiser" on the album sleeve, a purist principle of May's, as some listeners had mistaken their elaborate multi-tracking and effects, produced by guitar and vocals, as synthesisers.

== 2024 box set reissue ==
Queen I Collector's Edition

Box set by Queen
- Released: 25 October 2024
- Recorded: 23 August 1970; December 1971 - January 1972 (demo sessions); April – 30 July 1972; February - December 1973; 31 March - April 1974; 12 March 1976; 2024 (pitch corrections)
- Venues: Imperial College (London); Rainbow Theatre (London); San Diego Sports Arena
- Studios: De Lane Lea (London); Trident (London)
- Genres: Hard rock; heavy metal; progressive rock
- Length: 4:36:03
- Label: EMI
- Producer: Queen

Queen chronology
The Miracle Collector's Edition (2022)	Queen I Collector's Edition (2024)	Queen II Collector's Edition (2026)

Singles from Queen I Collector's Edition
- 1. "The Night Comes Down" Released: 13 September 2024; 2. "Modern Times Rock 'n' Roll" Released: 11 October 2024

On 11 September 2024, Queen announced their debut album had been remixed, remastered and expanded in a 6CD+1-LP box set titled Queen I Collector's Edition, set to be released on 25 October. This expansion contains 63 tracks with 43 brand new mixes, comprising the album with its intended running order restored, intimate fly-on-the-wall audio of Queen in the studio, alternative takes, demos, rare live tracks, and previously unheard live recordings. This is also the first time a Queen album has received a new stereo mix. A 108-page book containing handwritten lyrics and memorabilia accompanies the release. This will be the band's last reissue under Universal Music, as Sony Music acquired Queen's catalogue in 2024.

The first single of the box set, the 2024 mix of "The Night Comes Down", was released in conjunction with the announcement on 11 September, with an official music video premiering on YouTube on 13 September that year. The music video received mostly negative appraisal from the internet audience due to artificial intelligence used to generate the video. On 11 October, the new mix of "Modern Times Rock 'n' Roll" was released as a digital single. A special re-edited and restored edition of the "Keep Yourself Alive" promo video was released in conjunction with the boxset on 25 October.

The new 2024 mix includes "Mad the Swine", reinstated as the album's fourth song in-between "Great King Rat" and "My Fairy King". Previously unreleased material includes live versions of the song "Jesus", the first time a live version of the song has been heard, and a cover of the Bo Diddley written blues standard "I'm a Man", both from Queen's second ever concert in London at Imperial College on 23 August 1970, also bassist Barry Mitchell's first performance with the band. The box set also includes the first official release of the song "Hangman" in a live version from Queen's concert at the San Diego Sports Arena on 12 March 1976, in one of its final live performances. Queen says a studio version does not exist, but the song was performed live sporadically from 1970 to the Japanese A Night at the Opera tour in 1976.

=== Track listing ===
All lead vocals by Freddie Mercury unless noted.

==== Vinyl ====
Side one: Queen I - 2024 Mix
No.	Title	Writer(s)	Lead vocals	Length
1.	"Keep Yourself Alive"	Brian May	Mercury with Roger Taylor and Brian May	3:45
2.	"Doing All Right"	May; Tim Staffell		4:10
3.	"Great King Rat"	Freddie Mercury		5:45
4.	"Mad the Swine"	Mercury		3:20
5.	"My Fairy King"	Mercury		4:11

Side two
No.	Title	Writer(s)	Lead vocals	Length
1.	"Liar"	Mercury		6:26
2.	"The Night Comes Down"	May		4:21
3.	"Modern Times Rock 'n' Roll"	Roger Taylor	Taylor	1:48
4.	"Son and Daughter"	May		3:23
5.	"Jesus"	Mercury		3:42
6.	"Seven Seas of Rhye..." (Instrumental)	Mercury		1:19
Total length:				42:10

==== CD ====
Disc one: Queen I – 2024 Mix

Disc two: De Lane Lea Demos – 2024 Mix
No.	Title	Writer(s)	Lead vocals	Length
1.	"Keep Yourself Alive" (De Lane Lea Demo)	May	Mercury with Taylor and May	3:49
2.	"The Night Comes Down" (De Lane Lea Demo)	May		4:24
3.	"Great King Rat" (De Lane Lea Demo)	Mercury		6:13
4.	"Jesus" (De Lane Lea Demo)	Mercury		5:07
5.	"Liar" (De Lane Lea Demo)	Mercury		8:01
Total length:				27:34

Disc three: Queen I Sessions
No.	Title	Writer(s)	Lead vocals	Length
1.	"Keep Yourself Alive" (Trident Take 13 – Unused Master)	May	Mercury with Taylor and May	4:20
2.	"Doing All Right" (Trident Take 1 – with Guide Vocal)	May; Tim Staffell		4:25
3.	"Great King Rat" (De Lane Lea Take 1 – with Guide Vocal)	Mercury		5:48
4.	"Mad the Swine" (Trident Take 3 – with Guide Vocal)	Mercury		4:21
5.	"My Fairy King" (Trident Backing Track In Development)	Mercury		6:03
6.	"Liar" (Trident Take 1 – Unused Master)	Mercury		6:50
7.	"The Night Comes Down" (De Lane Lea Takes 1 & 2 – with Guide Vocal)	May		5:34
8.	"Modern Times Rock 'n' Roll" (Trident Takes 8 & 9)	Taylor	Taylor	2:52
9.	"Son and Daughter" (Trident Takes 1 & 2 – with Guide Vocal)	May		4:23
10.	"Jesus" (De Lane Lea Take 2 – with Guide Vocal)	Mercury		5:38
11.	"Seven Seas of Rhye..." (Instrumental, Trident Take 3)	Mercury		1:39
12.	"See What a Fool I’ve Been" (De Lane Lea Test Session)	May		6:11
Total length:				58:04

Disc four: Queen I Backing Tracks
No.	Title	Writer(s)	Length
1.	"Keep Yourself Alive" (Backing Track)	May	3:46
2.	"Doing All Right" (Backing Track)	May; Tim Staffell	4:11
3.	"Great King Rat" (Backing Track)	Mercury	5:46
4.	"Mad the Swine" (Backing Track)	Mercury	3:20
5.	"My Fairy King" (Backing Track)	Mercury	4:12
6.	"Liar" (Backing Track)	Mercury	6:27
7.	"The Night Comes Down" (Backing Track)	May	4:22
8.	"Modern Times Rock 'n' Roll" (Backing Track)	Taylor	1:48
9.	"Son and Daughter" (Backing Track)	May	3:23
10.	"Jesus" (Backing Track)	Mercury	3:42
11.	"Seven Seas of Rhye..." (Instrumental)	Mercury	1:19
Total length:			42:16

Disc five: Queen I At The BBC
No.	Title	Writer(s)	Lead vocals	Length
1.	"My Fairy King" (BBC Session 1, February 1973)	Mercury		4:16
2.	"Keep Yourself Alive" (BBC Session 1, February 1973)	May	Mercury with Taylor and May	3:53
3.	"Doing All Right" (BBC Session 1, February 1973)	May; Tim Staffell	Mercury with Taylor	4:17
4.	"Liar" (BBC Session 1, February 1973)	Mercury		6:35
5.	"Keep Yourself Alive" (BBC Session 2, July 1973)	May	Mercury with Taylor and May	3:56
6.	"Liar" (BBC Session 2, July 1973)	Mercury		6:37
7.	"Son and Daughter" (BBC Session 2, July 1973)	May		6:12
8.	"Modern Times Rock 'n' Roll" (BBC Session 3, December 1973)	Taylor	Taylor	2:06
9.	"Great King Rat" (BBC Session 3, December 1973)	Mercury		5:57
10.	"Son and Daughter" (BBC Session 3, December 1973)	May		7:15
11.	"Modern Times Rock 'n' Roll" (BBC Session 4, April 1974)	Taylor	Taylor	2:53
Total length:				53:57

Disc six: Queen I Live
No.	Title	Writer(s)	Length
1.	"Son and Daughter" (Live at the Rainbow, 31 March 1974)	May	3:49
2.	"Guitar Solo" (Live at the Rainbow, 31 March 1974)	May	2:25
3.	"Son and Daughter (Reprise)" (Live at the Rainbow, 31 March 1974)	May	1:52
4.	"Great King Rat" (Live at the Rainbow, 31 March 1974)	Mercury	6:49
5.	"Keep Yourself Alive" (Live at the Rainbow, 31 March 1974)	May	2:23
6.	"Drum Solo" (Live at the Rainbow, 31 March 1974)	Taylor	0:27
7.	"Keep Yourself Alive (Reprise)" (Live at the Rainbow, 31 March 1974)	May	1:18
8.	"Modern Times Rock 'n' Roll" (Live at the Rainbow, 31 March 1974)	Taylor	2:41
9.	"Liar" (Live at the Rainbow, 31 March 1974)	Mercury	7:47
10.	"Hangman" (Live at San Diego Sports Arena, 12 March 1976)	Queen	6:36
11.	"Doing All Right" (Live at San Diego Sports Arena, 12 March 1976)	May; Tim Staffell	5:32
12.	"Jesus" (Live at Imperial College, 23 August 1970)	Mercury	5:41
13.	"I'm a Man" (Live at Imperial College, 23 August 1970)	Bo Diddley	4:42
Total length:			52:02

== Charts ==
Chart (1974–1976)	Peak position
Australian Albums (Kent Music Report)	77
Japanese Albums (Oricon)	52
UK Albums (Official Charts)	24
US Billboard 200	83

Chart (2024)	Peak position
Austrian Albums (Ö3 Austria)	14
Belgian Albums (Ultratop Flanders)	58
Belgian Albums (Ultratop Wallonia)	27
Dutch Albums (Album Top 100)	14
German Albums (Offizielle Top 100)	6
Hungarian Physical Albums (MAHASZ)	10
Irish Albums (IRMA)	91
Japanese Albums (Oricon)	34
Japanese Hot Albums (Billboard Japan)	40
Polish Albums (ZPAV)	86
Swedish Physical Albums (Sverigetopplistan)	14
Swiss Albums (Schweizer Hitparade)	13
UK Albums (Official Charts)	10

== Certifications ==
Region	Certification	Certified units/sales
Canada (Music Canada)	Platinum	100,000^{^}
Poland (ZPAV) 2009 Agora SA album reissue	Platinum	20,000^{*}
United Kingdom (BPI)	Gold	100,000^{^}
United States (RIAA)	Gold	500,000^{^}
^{*} Sales figures based on certification alone.^{^} Shipments figures based on certification alone.
