= Supermix 1 =

Compilation album by Gasolin'
- Released: 1980
- Recorded: 1971–1976; 1971–1977 (Supermix)
- Genre: Rock
- Label: Columbia

Gasolin' chronology
Live i Skandinavien (1978)	Supermix 1 (1980)	Rabalderstræde Forever (1991)

Supermix 1 was released in 1980 as the first Gasolin' compilation. For some reason no songs from Gør det Noget were included, and popular songs such as "Rabalderstræde" and "Sirenesangen" are also absent. Therefore, this compilation was to become obsolete when Rabalderstræde Forever was released in 1991.

However, for Gasolin' collectors this compilation is a must as it includes the rare track, "Aloha". Supermix 1 is not identical with Supermix that was released in Sweden in 1980. Supermix has the rare track, "Where Do We Go Now, Mon Ami" and a rockier selection of songs.

== Track list ==
=== Supermix 1 ===
1. "Aloha" (Previously unreleased - 1973)
2. "Langebro" (from their debut album)
3. "Det var Inga, Katinka, Smukke Charlie på sin Harley" (from Gasolin' 3)
4. "Bingo" (from Stakkels Jim)
5. "Det er en kold tid" (non album track)
6. "Se din by fra tårnets top" (from Gasolin' 2)
7. "Dejlig er Jorden" (non album track)
8. "På banen" (from Gasolin' 2)
9. "De gule enker" (from Efter endnu en dag)
10. "Kvinde min" (from Gas 5)
11. "Hva' gør vi nu, lille du" (from Live Sådan)
12. "På en sommerdag" (from Gasolin' 2)
13. "Masser af succes" (from Gas 5)

=== Supermix ===
1. "Stakkels Jim" (Stakkels Jim)
2. "Girl you got me lonely" (Killin' Time)
3. "Det bedste til mig og mine venner" (Gør det noget)
4. "This is my life" (Yankeedrengerne)
5. "Det er en kold tid" (Christiania No 1) (N)
6. "Længes hjem" (Gør det noget)
7. "Dejlig er jorden" (Atomkraft? - Nej tak atom 1)
8. "Aloha" (Previously unreleased - 1973)
9. "Smukke Møller" (Gør det noget)
10. "Rebel run" (What a lemon)
11. "Strengelegen" (Gør det noget)
12. "Where do we go now" (Single - 1978)
13. "BobShiBam" (Gør det noget)
14. "De gule enker" (Efter endnu en dag)
15. "Kvinde min" (Gas 5)

== Credits ==
=== Gasolin' ===
- Franz Beckerlee - guitar, moog, vocals
- Wili Jønsson - bass, vocals, piano
- Kim Larsen - vocals, guitar, piano
- Søren Berlev - drums, vocals
