= Gasolin' Forever =

Compilation album by Gasolin'
- Released: 1999
- Recorded: 1971–1978
- Genre: Rock
- Length: 72:43 + 74:27
- Label: Columbia
- Producer: Franz Beckerlee

Gasolin' chronology
A Foreign Affair (1997)	Gasolin' Forever (1999)	The Early Years (2000)

Gasolin' Forever is a double-CD from 1999 that contains two previously released albums: Rabalderstræde Forever (1991) and the live album Derudaf Forever (1993).

== Track list ==
=== Disc one: Rabalderstræde Forever ===
1. "Langebro" (from their debut album)
2. "På banen" (from Gasolin' 2)
3. "Det var Inga, Katinka og Smukke Charlie på sin Harley" (from Gasolin' 3)
4. "Se din by fra tårnets top" (from Gasolin' 2)
5. "Kap Farvel til Umanarssuaq" (from Stakkels Jim)
6. "Rabalderstræde" (from Gas 5)
7. "Kvinde min" (from Gas 5)
8. "Pilli Villi" (from Efter endnu en dag)
9. "Stakkels Jim" (from Stakkels Jim)
10. "Længes hjem" (from Gør det noget)
11. "Sirenesangen" (from Efter endnu en dag)
12. "Kloden drejer stille rundt" (Efter endnu en dag)
13. "Pas på svinget i Solrød" (Efter endnu en dag)
14. "Uh-Lu-La-Lu" (non album track)
15. "Masser af succes" (from Gas 5)
16. "Get On The Train" (from Gør det noget)
17. "Strengelegen" (from Gør det noget)
18. "Hva' gør vi nu, lille du" (from Live sådan)
19. "Jumbo nummer nul" (from Gør det noget)
20. "Det bedste til mig og mine venner" (from Gør det noget)
21. "Som et strejf af en dråbe" (non album track)

=== Disc two: Derudaf Forever ===
1. "Kina Rock"
  - Tivoli 19 February 1978
2. "Nanna"
  - Holstebro 24 January 1976
3. "Smukke Linda"
  - Holstebro 24 January 1976
4. "Det Bedste til Mig og Mine Venner"
  - Oslo 10 August 1978
5. "Get on the Train"
  - Greve 13 February 1978
6. "Hvad Gør Vi Nu, Lille Du"
  - Oslo 10 August 1978
7. "1975"
  - Holstebro 24 January 1976
8. "Pas på Svinget i Solrød"
  - Helsingborg 20 August 1978
9. "På Banen (Derudaf)"
  - Holstebro 24 January 1976
10. "Jumbo Nummer Nul"
  - Greve 13 February 1978
11. "December i New York"
  - Tivoli 19 February 1978
12. "Kattemor"
  - Oslo 10 August 1978
13. "Kloden Drejer Stille Rundt"
  - Oslo 10 August 1978
14. "Fi-Fi-Dong"
  - Tivoli 19 February 1978
15. "Strengelegen"
  - Helsingborg 20 August 1978
16. "Girl You Got Me Lonely"
  - Tivoli 19 February 1978
17. "Refrainet er Frit"
  - Tivoli 19 February 1978
18. "Som et Strejf af en Dråbe"
  - Tivoli 19 February 1978

== Credits ==
=== Gasolin' ===
- Franz Beckerlee - guitar, moog, e-bow, vocals
- Wili Jønsson - bass, vocals, piano
- Kim Larsen - vocals, guitar, piano
- Søren Berlev - drums, vocals

== Certifications ==
Region	Certification	Certified units/sales
Denmark (IFPI Danmark)	Platinum	50,000^{^}
^{^} Shipments figures based on certification alone.
