= What a Lemon =

Studio album by Gasolin'
- Released: August 1976
- Recorded: June 1975 at Rosenberg studio, Copenhagen and March 1976 in New York City
- Genre: Rock
- Length: 38:09
- Language: English
- Label: Epic
- Producer: Roy Thomas Baker

Gasolin' chronology
Gas 5 (1975)	What a Lemon (1976)	Efter endnu en dag (1976)

Alternative cover
- Cover of the UK version

What a Lemon is an album by Danish rock band Gasolin', released in August 1976 on Epic Records in the United States, some parts of Europe, Japan and Australia. It is the third of four albums with English lyrics that Gasolin' released between 1974 and 1978 in an attempt to break the international music market. The album received good reviews from leading American rock critics, but lack of airplay and the fact that the record company invested only small efforts in promotion and distribution meant that it never earned the band the public acclaim it was striving for.

== History ==
By the start of 1976 Gasolin' was the most popular band in Denmark. Their latest LP Gas 5, issued the previous year, had sold 65.000 copies and earned them a Gold record. But the band had ambitions of international fame, and while re-negotiating their record contract with CBS they demanded to have an album issued in the United States as part of the deal. A compromise was made that granted them a record contract with Epic Records, a subsidiary of Columbia, the equivalent to CBS in the States. In cooperation with Englishman Mick Moloney and Danish author Jan Bredsdorf, the band wrote English lyrics to the songs from Gas 5. In March Gasolin' traveled to New York to re-record the lyrics; however upon their arrival, Epic's A&R chief Lennie Petze intimated that the English lyrics needed further development and assigned the "clean-up" task to Epic employee Dan Beck who had an aspiring talent for poetry.

The resulting album was released internationally on 1 August 1976, but on Gasolin's own request it wasn't initially made available to record buyers in Denmark. Despite this, it entered the Top 20 of the Danish albums chart thanks to the band's popularity in their home country and direct import by a number of record shops. Finally Gasolin' ceased their resistance, and the record was officially released in Denmark as well.

== Title ==
The album was released in the United States as Gasolin' , but renamed What a Lemon for the rest of the world. The disparity is due to the band releasing previous albums named Gasolin' . All told, Gasolin' released three albums named Gasolin' : Their first Danish album, their first British album and their first American album.

== Album cover ==
Most editions of What a Lemon were released with the cover picture from the third Danish album Gasolin' 3, a wall-painting of an unlucky girl losing her knickers, surrounded by a white border. She had however already been used for the first English album, so instead a photo of the band members from the gatefold cover of their 1971 eponymous Danish debut album was chosen as cover for the English edition.

== Songs ==
The track list is nearly identical to the original Danish album Gas 5 (1975), except that "1975" and "Good Time Charlie" were omitted and replaced by "Rabalderstraede" and "The Last Jim". "Rabalderstraede" is the Danish version of the title song, "What a Lemon". "The Last Jim" is an instrumental taken from the Danish album Stakkels Jim (1974).

== Reception ==
Professional ratings
Review scores
Source	Rating
Robert Christgau	A−
Rolling Stone	(favorable)

What a Lemon received positive reviews from leading American music magazines like The Village Voice and Rolling Stone. In the former, Robert Christgau called it a "wonderfully improbable record" and awarded it the rating A− in his Consumers Guide despite the "translations provided in part by an Epic PR man who deserves a new job." He also positioned it as no. 19 on his end-of-the-year "Dean's List" of his personal favorite albums, counting for the 1976 Pazz & Jop critic's poll. Rolling Stone reviewer Wayne Robins called the music "American-style rock with finesse and flexibility" but was also not impressed by the English lyrics: "Not only is repeating the same song ["What a Lemon"/"Rabalderstraede"] a bit of featherbedding, but the Danish version is much better; though you don't know what singer Kim Larsen is saying, his salacious delivery makes it clear something ribald is going on." Nevertheless, he concluded the review by stating that "(...) Gasolin' plays and sings convincingly. This is certainly a band worth watching. Next time a blend of English and Danish songs might be novel enough to attract the American audience Gasolin' deserves."

The album eventually sold an estimated 20,000 copies in the United States.

== Track listing ==
=== Side one ===
1. "What a Lemon" (Music: Gasolin' / Lyrics: Gasolin', Skip Malone, Dan Beck, Jan Bredsdorf) – 4:57
2. "Fatherless Hill" (Music: Kim Larsen, Gasolin' / Lyrics: Larsen) – 4:16
3. "Lonesome Avenue" (Music: Larsen / Lyrics: Larsen) – 3:25
4. "Rebel Run" (Music: Gasolin', Tommy Petersen / Lyrics: Beck) – 2:58
5. "Lots of Success" (Music: Gasolin' / Lyrics: Gasolin', Beck) – 3:40

=== Side two ===
1. "It's All the Same to an American Dane" (Music: Gasolin' / Lyrics: Gasolin', Mick Moloney, Beck) – 3:54
2. "Lady Oh Lady" (Music: Gasolin' / Lyrics: Gasolin', Moloney) – 2:43
3. "Sad Song of the Bluebird" (Music: Gasolin' / Lyrics: Gasolin', Moloney) – 4:31
4. "Rabalderstraede" (Music: Larsen, Wili Jønsson / Lyrics: Gasolin', Mogens Mogensen) – 4:50
5. "The Last Jim" (Larsen, Franz Beckerlee) – 2:55

== Personnel ==
=== Gasolin' ===
- Kim Larsen – vocals, rhythm guitar
- Franz Beckerlee – lead guitar, moog, harmonica, vocals
- Wili Jønsson – bass, keyboards, vocals
- Søren Berlev – drums, percussion, vocals

=== Additional musicians ===
- Wolfgang Käfer – string arrangements (all tracks except "The Last Jim")
- Palle Mikkelborg – string arrangements ("The Last Jim")
- Anne Linnet, Lis Sørensen – backing vocals ("Fatherless Hill")
- Hugo Rasmussen – double bass ("Lonesome Avenue")

=== Production ===
- Roy Thomas Baker – producer
- Freddy Hansson – engineer

== Release history ==
Region	Title	Date	Label	Format	Catalog
United States	Gasolin'	August 1976	Epic Records	stereo LP	PE 34149
Europe	What a Lemon	August 1976	Epic Records	stereo LP	EPC 81436
Australia	What a Lemon	15 November 1976	Epic Records	stereo LP	ELPS 3781
Japan	What a Lemon	1976	Epic Records	stereo LP	25AP 301
Scandinavia	A Foreign Affair II (Note: Reissue bundled with The Last Jim)	2002	Sony Music Entertainment	double CD	SM 2965-05
