= Gasolin' (1974 album) =

1974 album by Gasolin', their first with English lyrics

Studio album by Gasolin'
- Released: Early 1974
- Recorded: August 1973 and January 1974 at Rosenberg studio, Copenhagen
- Genre: Rock
- Length: 34:34
- Language: English
- Label: CBS
- Producer: Roy Thomas Baker

Gasolin' chronology
Gasolin' 3 (1973)	Gasolin' (1974)	Stakkels Jim (1974)

Singles from Gasolin'
- 1. "Lucky Linda" Released: 1974 (Germany)

Gasolin' is the first album with English lyrics by rock band Gasolin' in an attempt to win the band recognition outside their native Denmark. It is almost identical to their third Danish album, Gasolin' 3 and was released in some Western European countries in the beginning of 1974 on CBS. It failed to make impact on the charts anywhere, but didn't stop Gasolin' from issuing three more albums in English in the period from 1974 to 1978.

== History ==
After the artistic and commercial success of Gasolin' 2, singer and principal songwriter Kim Larsen left the band. He was unhappy as he felt that too many of his new songs were rejected by the other band members. Poul Bruun, the director of CBS in Denmark, afraid to see the band disappear resolved the situation by letting Larsen record a solo album, Værsgo. He further allowed Gasolin' to record their next album in two versions, one in Danish for the home market and one with English lyrics to be released in Europe. To provide the right international sound, the record company brought Englishman Roy Thomas Baker to Copenhagen to produce the album in August 1973. Baker, at the time a hot name in the record industry following his recent success with Queen, had already worked as engineer on the band's debut album Gasolin' in 1970 and was happy to work with them again. After finishing Gasolin' 3, the band teamed up with Leonard "Skip" Malone, an American living in Denmark at the time, who helped the band translate the Danish lyrics into English. The lyrics were re-recorded in January 1974 and the resulting album released shortly after.

== Song selection ==
Seven of the songs are taken from the original Danish album Gasolin' 3 (released a few months before). The last two, "If You Dare" and "Lilli-Lilli", are re-recordings (with Baker as producer) of "Langebro" and "Lilli-Lilli" respectively, that were first released on the band's first album, Gasolin' in 1971.

== Track listing ==
Except where otherwise noted, the music is written by Gasolin' and the lyrics by Gasolin' and Skip Malone.

=== Side one ===
1. "Lucky Linda" – 5:02
2. "If You Dare" (Trad. / Lyrics: Gasolin', Malone) – 3:15
3. "Quasimodo's Song" – 4:05
4. "Lilli-Lilli" – 4:55

=== Side two ===
1. "It Was Inga, Katinka And Groovy Charlie On His Harley" (Music: Tommy Pedersen / Lyrics: Gasolin', Malone) – 2:51
2. "The Big Hullabaloo" – 2:28
3. "The Cat" – 2:50
4. "Stark Raving Mad" – 3:15
5. "Sju-Bi-Du-Bi-Man" – 5:53

== Personnel ==
=== Gasolin' ===
- Kim Larsen – vocals, rhythm guitar, lead guitar on "It Was Inga, Katinka..." and "Quasimodo's Song"
- Franz Beckerlee – lead guitar, moog, vocals, bass on "Stark Raving Mad"
- Wili Jønsson – bass, piano, organ, vocals
- Søren Berlev – drums, percussion

=== Additional musicians ===
- Niels Harrit – tenor saxophone, baritone saxophone, percussion

=== Production ===
- Roy Thomas Baker – producer
- Freddy Hansson – engineer

== Release history ==
Region	Title	Date	Label	Format	Catalog
Western Europe	Gasolin'	Early 1974	CBS	stereo LP	CBS 80099
Scandinavia	A Foreign Affair (Note: Reissue bundled with Killin' Time)	1997	Columbia	double CD	Columbia 487177 2
