= The Last Jim =

Studio album by Gasolin'
- Released: November 1974
- Recorded: Late 1974 at Rosenberg studio, Copenhagen
- Genre: Rock
- Length: 38:52
- Language: English
- Label: CBS
- Producer: Roy Thomas Baker

Gasolin' chronology
Gasolin' 3 (1973)	The Last Jim (1974)	Stakkels Jim (1974)

The Last Jim is the second album with English lyrics by Danish rock band Gasolin'. It was released in some Western European countries in November 1974 on CBS, simultaneously to its Danish counterpart Stakkels Jim. The songs are identical on the two albums, except for the lyrics. Like on their previous album Gasolin' of the same year, American Leonard "Skip" Malone, helped the band translate the Danish lyrics into English.

All songs are Gasolin' originals, except "Blood Brothers" which is their interpretation of Robert Burns' 18th century poem "Auld Lang Syne".

== Track listing ==
=== Side one ===
1. "Mrs. Boogie Woogie" (Kim Larsen) – 3:40
2. "Little Pasha Honeysuckle Divine" (Gasolin' / Gasolin', Skip Malone) – 3:13
3. "Bingo" (Larsen / Gasolin', Malone) – 3:04
4. "Boogaloo" (Wili Jønsson, Franz Beckerlee / Gasolin', Malone) – 3:03
5. "Cellophane Brain" (Gasolin' / Gasolin', Malone) – 6:03

=== Side two ===
1. "Deadline" (Gasolin' / Gasolin', Malone) – 3:25
2. "Where Do We Go From Here" (Larsen / Gasolin', Malone) – 2:36
3. "Fool Of The Night" (Larsen / Gasolin', Malone) – 3:15
4. "Anna Lee" (Gasolin' / Gasolin', Malone) – 3:11
5. "Blood Brothers" (Trad: Arr. Gasolin' / Gasolin', Malone) – 4:27
6. "The Last Jim" (Larsen, Beckerlee) – 2:55

== Personnel ==
=== Gasolin' ===
- Kim Larsen – vocals, rhythm guitar, moog
- Franz Beckerlee – lead guitar, moog, harmonica, vocals
- Wili Jønsson – bass, keyboards, vocals, harmonium
- Søren Berlev – drums, percussion, vocals

=== Additional musicians ===
- Steen Vig - soprano saxophone, tenor saxophone
- Hugo Rasmussen - double bass
- Palle Mikkelborg - string arrangements

=== Production ===
- Roy Thomas Baker – producer
- Freddy Hansson – engineer

== Release history ==
Region	Title	Date	Label	Format	Catalog
Europe	The Last Jim	November 1974	CBS	stereo LP	CBS 80470
Scandinavia	A Foreign Affair II (Note: Reissue bundled with What a Lemon)	2002	Sony Music	double CD	SM 2965–05
