= Foreign affairs (disambiguation) =

Foreign affairs, or foreign policy, consists of strategies chosen by a state to safeguard its national interests and to achieve goals in international relations.

Foreign Affairs is an American journal of international relations.

Foreign affairs and similar terms may also refer to:

== International relations ==
- Ministry of foreign affairs, a governmental cabinet department; includes a list of Foreign Ministries
- Diplomacy, the art and practice of conducting negotiations between states
- International relations, an academic field of study
- Civil affairs, a term used by the United Nations and military organizations to cover methods of dealing with civilian population

== Film ==
- Foreign Affaires, a 1935 British comedy film
- A Foreign Affair, a 1948 American romantic comedy film by Billy Wilder
- A Foreign Affair (2003 film), a story of a romance tour

== Television ==
=== Episodes ===
- "A Foreign Affair", Coupling (American) episode 6 (2003)
- "A Foreign Affair", Empty Nest season 6, episode 23 (1994)
- "A Foreign Affair", Fudge season 2, episode 11 (1995)
- "A Foreign Affair", Three's a Crowd episode 10 (1984)
- "Foreign Affair", The District season 2, episode 2 (2001)
- "Foreign Affair", Too Something episode 21 (1996)
- "Foreign Affairs", Designing Women season 4, episode 24 (1990)
- "Foreign Affairs", ER season 9, episode 20 (2003)
- "Foreign Affairs", Family Guy, season 9, episode 17 (2011)
- "Foreign Affairs", Lilyhammer season 3, episode 2 (2014)
- "Foreign Affairs", Major Crimes season 5, episode 3 (2016)
- "Foreign Affairs", M*A*S*H season 11, episode 3 (1982)
- "Foreign Affairs", NCIS: New Orleans season 2, episode 5 (2015)
- "Foreign Affairs", Normal, Ohio episode 2 (2000)
- "Foreign Affairs", Saved by the Bell: The New Class season 5, episode 20 (1997)
- "Foreign Affairs", Shelley series 3, episode 4 (1981)
- "Foreign Affairs", The Good Wife season 2, episode 20 (2011)
- "Foreign Affairs", Top Chef: D.C. episode 8 (2010)

=== Shows ===
- Foreign Affairs (1964 TV series), a 1964 ITV British sitcom and spin-off of Bootsie and Snudge
- Foreign Affairs (1966 TV series), a 1966 BBC British sitcom starring Leslie Phillips

== Music ==
=== Albums ===
- Foreign Affair (Frankie Laine album), 1958
- Foreign Affair, Tina Turner album, 1989
- Foreign Affairs (Tom Waits album), 1977, including song "Foreign Affair"
- Foreign Affairs (Sharon O'Neill album), 1983
- A Foreign Affair (Gasolin' album), 1997
- A Foreign Affair II, double compilation album released by Gasolin' in 2002
- A Foreign Affair (Spyro Gyra album), 2011

=== Songs ===
- "Foreign Affair" (Tina Turner song), the title song
- "Foreign Affair" (Mike Oldfield song), 1983
- A Foreign Affair (song), a Client Liaison song, featuring Tina Arena, 2017

=== Tours ===
- Foreign Affair: The Farewell Tour, a 1990 concert tour by Turner

== Literature ==
- A Foreign Affair, a 1954 novel by E. Howard Hunt under the pseudonym John Baxter
- Foreign Affairs, a 1974 novel by Hugh Fleetwood
- Foreign Affairs and Other Stories, a 1976 short story collection by Seán Ó Faoláin
- A Foreign Affair, a 1982 novel by John Rowe Townsend
- Foreign Affairs (novel), a 1984 novel by Alison Lurie
- Foreign Affair, a 1993 novel by Eva Rutland
- Foreign Affairs, a 1994 novel by Patricia Scanlan
- Foreign Affairs, a multi-author anthology series of romance novel omnibuses beginning in 1995, with select novels written by Miranda Lee, Helen Bianchin, Robyn Donald, Anne Mather, Day Leclaire and more
- A Foreign Affair, the American alternative title of Death at Dawn, a 2007 novel by Caro Peacock
- Foreign Affairs, a 2015 novel by Stuart Woods, the 35th installment in the Stone Barrington novel series

== Other uses ==
- A Foreign Affair (company), an international dating and marriage agency
