= 231045-0637 =

1979 album by Kim Larsen

Studio album by Kim Larsen
- Released: 1979
- Studio: Sweet Silence
- Genre: Rock
- Length: 34:00
- Label: CBS
- Producer: Nils Henriksson

Kim Larsen chronology
Starfuckers: Vogt Dem for efterligninger (1978)	231045-0637 (1979)	Jungle Dreams (1981)

231045-0637 is a rock album released in 1979 by Kim Larsen, a Danish rock musician. The album became known as Personnummerpladen (English: The Personal Identification Number Record), as its official title was Larsen's personal identification number. It was Larsen's third solo album, and the first following the break-up of Gasolin'.

231045-0637 was recorded in Sweet Silence studios in Copenhagen and produced by Nils Henriksen. Its style differs from the hard rock of Gasolin'. By comparison, it is more pop-based and represents the start of the electronic sounds that would dominate his next records, Jungle Dreams and Midt om natten.

== Track listing ==
No.	Title	Length
1.	"Moderne tider"	2:07
2.	"Dagen før"	3:30
3.	"682 A"	2:24
4.	"Blip-Båt"	3:41
5.	"Ud i det blå"	2:48
6.	"Forever Young"	2:42
7.	"Sikken en følelse"	3:00
8.	"Køb bananer"	3:45
9.	"Tutta"	1:46
10.	"Ole's fjerner"	2:52
11.	"Monkeymand"	3:34
12.	"De blå sirener"	1:53

== Charts ==
Chart (2006)	Peak position
Norwegian Albums (VG-lista)	7
Swedish Albums (Sverigetopplistan)	2

== Certifications and sales ==
Region	Certification	Certified units/sales
Denmark	—	130,000
Denmark (IFPI Danmark) reissue	Gold	10,000^{‡}
^{‡} Sales+streaming figures based on certification alone.
