= A Foreign Affair II =

A Foreign Affair 2

Compilation album by Gasolin'
- Released: 2002
- Recorded: 1974 and 1975
- Genre: Rock
- Length: 2CD
- Language: English
- Label: Columbia
- Producer: Roy Thomas Baker

Gasolin' chronology
The Early Years (2000)	A Foreign Affair 2 (2002)	The Black Box (2003)

A Foreign Affair 2 is double compilation album released by Danish rock band Gasolin' in 2002.

It contains the English album What a Lemon on the first disc and The Last Jim on the second disc. Between 1974 and 1978, Gasolin' released four albums with English lyrics in an attempt to break the international music market, but had little success.

The first album, released in the United States as Gasolin' , was renamed What a Lemon for the English market. The disparity is due to the band releasing a previous album in England named Gasolin' . All told, Gasolin' released three albums named Gasolin': Their first Danish album, their first British album and their first American album.

The Last Jim (1975) and What a Lemon (1976) are nearly identical to Stakkels Jim (1974) and Gas 5 (1975), respectively. On What a Lemon, "Good Time Charlie" was omitted and replaced by "Rabalderstraede" and "The Last Jim". "Rabalderstraede" is identical to the song "What a Lemon".

== Track list ==
=== Disc one: What a Lemon ===
1. "What a Lemon"
2. "Fatherless Hill"
3. "Lonesome Avenue"
4. "Rebel Run"
5. "Lots Of Success"
6. "It's All The Same To An American Dane"
7. "Lady Oh Lady"
8. "Sad Song Of The Bluebird"
9. "Rabalderstraede"
10. "The Last Jim"

=== Disc two: The Last Jim ===
1. "Mrs. Boogie Woogie"
2. "Pasha Honeysuckle Divine"
3. "Bingo"
4. "Boogaloo"
5. "Cellophane Brain"
6. "Deadline"
7. "Where Do We Go From Here"
8. "Fool Of The Night"
9. "Anna Lee"
10. "Blood Brothers"
11. "The Last Jim"

== Credits ==
=== Gasolin' ===
- Franz Beckerlee – guitar, moog, e-bow, vocals
- Wili Jønsson – bass, vocals, piano
- Kim Larsen – Vocals, guitar, piano
- Søren Berlev – drums, vocals
- Producer: Roy Thomas Baker
- Engineer: Freddy Hansson
- Assistant engineer: Flemming Rasmussen

== See also ==
Danish rock
