= A Foreign Affair (Gasolin' album) =

1997 compilation album by Gasolin'

Compilation album by Gasolin'
- Released: 1997
- Recorded: 1973–1977
- Genre: Rock
- Language: English
- Label: Columbia
- Producers: Felix Pappalardi; Roy Thomas Baker

Gasolin' chronology
'Derudaf Forever' (1993)	A Foreign Affair (1997)	Gasolin' Forever (1999)

Professional ratings
Review scores
Source	Rating
AllMusic	4/5 stars

A Foreign Affair is a double CD compilation album released by Danish rock band Gasolin' in 1997.

A Foreign Affair is made up of two albums made for the English speaking market in the seventies. Gasolin' was released in 1974, and Killin' Time in 1978. On cd number 1, there are two bonustracks, "I'm Only Asking" and "Don't Fall Asleep On The Subway", which have never been released before.

This is the original mix of Killin' Time mixed for the American marked in 1977, but never previously released.

In 2002 Vol II was released. A Foreign Affair II.

== Track list ==
=== Disc one: Killin' Time ===
1. "Girl You Got Me Lonely"
2. "Closer"
3. "Jailbait"
4. "Let It Flow"
5. "Snow Queen"
6. "Killin' Time"
7. "In The Wings"
8. "Highschool"
9. "Stop"
10. "Sing My Song"
11. "Magic Garden"

=== Disc two: Gasolin' ===
1. "Lucky Linda"
2. "If You Dare"
3. "Quasimodo's Song"
4. "Lilli-Lilli"
5. "I'm Only Asking"
6. "It Was Inga, Katinka And Groovy Charlie On His Harley"
7. "The Big Hullabaloo"
8. "The Cat"
9. "Stark Raving Mad"
10. "Sju-Bi-Du-Bi-Man"
11. "Don't Fall Asleep On The Subway"

== Personnel ==
=== Gasolin' ===
- Franz Beckerlee – guitar, moog, e-bow, vocals
- Wili Jønsson – bass, vocals, piano
- Kim Larsen – Vocals, guitar, piano
- Søren Berlev – drums, vocals

On Killin' Time:

- Felix Pappalardi – bass, keyboards
- Produced by Felix Pappalardi
- Recorded in Sweet Silence Studio during spring 1977
- Engineered by Freddy Hansson and Flemming Rasmussen

On Gasolin':

- Producer: Roy Thomas Baker
- Engineer: Freddy Hansson
