= Derudaf Forever =

Live album by Gasolin'
- Released: 1993
- Recorded: 1976 and 1978; Sweet Silence Mobile Studio
- Genre: Rock
- Length: 74:27
- Label: Columbia
- Producer: Franz Beckerlee

Gasolin' chronology
Rabalderstræde Forever (1991)	Derudaf Forever (1993)	A Foreign Affair (1997)

Derudaf Forever is a live album by Danish rock band Gasolin', released 15 years after it was recorded.

The success of the Rabalderstræde Forever compilation in 1991 was followed by this live album in 1993. It was Gasolin's third live album, the other two are Live Sådan and Live i Skandinavien. Derudaf Forever contains 18 songs recorded by Sweet Silence Mobile Studio in 1976 and 1978.

It was released as a double LP and single CD and was produced by Franz Beckerlee. It was engineered by Freddy Hansson, Flemming Rasmussen and Tom West and mixed by Franz Beckerlee and Flemming Hansson in 1992. In 1999 Derudaf Forever was released as Gasolin' Forever as a part of a 2CD compilation with Rabalderstræde Forever.

== Track listing ==
1. "Kina Rock"
  - Tivoli 19 February 1978
2. "Nanna"
  - Holstebro 24 January 1976
3. "Smukke Linda"
  - Holstebro 24 January 1976
4. "Det Bedste til Mig og Mine Venner"
  - Oslo 10 August 1978
5. "Get on the Train"
  - Greve 13 February 1978
6. "Hvad Gør Vi Nu, Lille Du"
  - Oslo 10 August 1978
7. "1975"
  - Holstebro 24 January 1976
8. "Pas på Svinget i Solrød"
  - Helsingborg 20 August 1978
9. "På Banen (Derudaf)"
  - Holstebro 24 January 1976
10. "Jumbo Nummer Nul"
  - Greve 13 February 1978
11. "December i New York"
  - Tivoli 19 February 1978
12. "Kattemor"
  - Oslo 10 August 1978
13. "Kloden Drejer Stille Rundt"
  - Oslo 10 August 1978
14. "Fi-Fi-Dong"
  - Tivoli 19 February 1978
15. "Strengelegen"
  - Helsingborg 20 August 1978
16. "Girl You Got Me Lonely"
  - Tivoli 19 February 1978
17. "Refrainet er Frit"
  - Tivoli 19 February 1978
18. "Som et Strejf af en Dråbe"
  - Tivoli 19 February 1978

== Credits ==
=== Gasolin' ===
- Søren "Charlie" Berlev - Vocals and drums
- Kim Larsen - vocals and guitar
- Franz Beckerlee - Vocals and lead guitar
- Wili Jønsson - Vocals, piano and bass
- Recorded in Sweet Silence Mobile Studio summer/vinter 1976/78
- Recorded by Freddy Hansson, Flemming "Flim-Flam" Rasmussen and Tom West
- Mixed in Sweet Silence Mobile Studios October - December 1992
- Mixed by Flemming "Junior" Hansson and Franz Beckerlee
- Mastering by Lene Reidel
