= Star Castle (disambiguation) =

Star Castle or Starcastle may refer to:

- Star Castle, Isles of Scilly, a fortress in the United Kingdom
- Star Castle, a 1980 video arcade game
- Starcastle, a rock band from the USA formed in 1969
- Starcastle (album), a 1976 album by the above band

== See also ==
- Star fortress
