= Citadel (Starcastle album) =

Studio album by Starcastle
- Released: October 1977
- Recorded: Chipping Norton Recording Studios, Chipping Norton, Oxfordshire, England
- Genre: Progressive rock
- Length: 39:15
- Label: Epic
- Producer: Roy Thomas Baker

Starcastle chronology
Fountains of Light (1977)	Citadel (1977)	Real to Reel (1978)

Citadel is the third studio album by American progressive rock band Starcastle. It is the second of two Starcastle albums to be produced by Roy Thomas Baker. Art for the album was created by Brothers Hildebrandt, the renowned fantasy illustrators. Unlike their first two albums, Citadel features shorter, more concise compositions from the band. This trend would further continue in Starcastle's next album, Real to Reel.

== Critical reception ==
Professional ratings
Review scores
Source	Rating
AllMusic	3/5 stars

The Los Angeles Times called the album "so delightful, it reignites all one's previous high hopes for the group ... Starcastle uses its source material as more than proof of good listening taste." It reached No. 156 on US Billboard.

== Track listing ==
All songs written by Starcastle.

Side 1

1. "Shine On Brightly" - 5:14
2. "Shadows of Song" - 5:08
3. "Can't Think Twice" - 3:51
4. "Wings of White" - 4:48

Side 2

1. "Evening Wind" - 5:27
2. "Change in Time" - 4:31
3. "Could This Be Love?" - 3:23
4. "Why Have They Gone?" - 6:53

== Personnel ==
=== Band ===
- Terry Luttrell - lead vocals
- Matthew Stewart - backing vocals, electric guitar, mandolin
- Stephen Hagler - backing vocals, electric guitar
- Gary Strater - backing vocals, bass guitar, bass pedals
- Herb Schildt - piano, synthesizer, organ, Mellotron, Oberheim OB-X
- Stephen Tassler - backing vocals, drums, percussion
