= Fountains of Light =

Studio album by Starcastle
- Released: January 1977
- Recorded: 1976
- Studios: Le Studio, Morin Heights, Quebec, Canada
- Genre: Progressive rock
- Length: 36:14
- Label: Epic
- Producer: Roy Thomas Baker

Starcastle chronology
Starcastle (1976)	Fountains of Light (1977)	Citadel (1977)

Professional ratings
Review scores
Source	Rating
AllMusic	3/5 stars

Fountains of Light is the second studio album by American progressive rock band Starcastle. It was their first of two albums to be produced by Roy Thomas Baker and released in January 1977. It reached No. 101 on US Billboard.

== Production ==
While driving to Le Studio on icy mountain roads, the band was following Roy Thomas Baker in their own vehicle and was involved in a car accident that sent bassist Gary Strater to the hospital. Baker has said making the album was fun, but "a complete disaster" from the very first day.

== Track listing ==
- All songs written and arranged by Starcastle.

Side 1

1. "Fountains" - 10:25
2. "Dawning of the Day" - 3:46
3. "Silver Winds" - 4:57

Side 2

1. "True to the Light" - 6:27
2. "Portraits" - 5:03
3. "Diamond Song (Deep Is the Light)" - 5:36

== Credits ==
Band

- Terry Luttrell - Lead vocals
- Herb Schildt - Synthesizers, organ, piano
- Gary Strater - Bass guitar, bass pedals, vocals
- Stephen Hagler - Guitars, vocals
- Matthew Stewart - Guitars, vocals
- Stephen Tassler - Drums, percussion, vocals

Production

- Recorded at: Le Studio, Morin Heights, Quebec, Canada
- Engineered by Nick Blagona
- Re-mixed at Sarm Studios, London, England
- Engineered by Gary Lyons
- Mastered at Sterling Sound, New York, New York
- Engineered by George Marino
