= Real to Reel (Starcastle album) =

Studio album by Starcastle
- Released: August 1978
- Recorded: April-May 1978
- Studios: The Record Plant in Sausalito, California
- Genre: Progressive rock
- Length: 37:10
- Label: Epic
- Producer: Jeffrey Lesser

Starcastle chronology
Citadel (1977)	Real to Reel (1978)	Chronos I (2001)

Professional ratings
Review scores
Source	Rating
Allmusic	2/5 stars
Robert Christgau	C

Real to Reel is the fourth studio album by American progressive rock band Starcastle. It was their final release on Epic Records.

== Reception ==
Real to Reel marked a drastic change of direction from their previous progressive rock efforts to a more album-oriented rock sound. It was a commercial failure, generally panned by critics and fans alike and ultimately led to Starcastle disbanding. Bassist Gary Strater moved to San Francisco before forming a new version of the band in 1985 that featured future Vicious Rumors guitarist Mark McGee.

== Track listing ==
All songs written by Starcastle, except where noted.

Side 1

1. "Half a Mind to Leave Ya" - 4:48
2. "Whatcha Gonna Do (When It All Comes Down On You)" - 3:33
3. "We Did It" - 3:54
4. "Nobody's Fool" - 4:00 (J. Lesser and Starcastle)
5. "Song For Alaya" - 3:06

Side 2

1. "So Here We Are" - 3:57 (J. Lesser and Starcastle)
2. "She" - 3:43 (J. Lesser and Starcastle)
3. "The Stars Are Out Tonight" - 3:53
4. "When The Sun Shines At Midnight" - 6:16

== Personnel ==
Starcastle

- Terry Luttrell - lead vocals (except on "Song For Alaya")
- Stephen Hagler - lead vocals (on "Song For Alaya"), backing vocals, electric guitar, piano
- Matthew Stewart - backing vocals, electric guitar, slide guitar, electric sitar
- Gary Strater - backing vocals, bass guitar, clavinet
- Herb Schildt - piano, synthesizer, organ, string arrangements
- Stephen Tassler - backing vocals, drums, percussion

Production Staff

- Engineering and mixing - Jeffrey Lesser and Tom Pye
- Assistant engineer - Rick Sanchez
- Personal direction - Artistic Vision LTD, Irv Zuckerman, Steve Schankman, Paul Tassler
- Photography - Bob Seidemann
