= Kim i Cirkus =

Kim i cirkus

Live album by Kim Larsen
- Released: May 1985
- Recorded: 14 April 1984
- Genre: Pop rock
- Length: 50:04
- Label: Medley
- Producer: Poul Bruun

Kim i cirkus (Danish for Kim at the Circus) is a live album by the Danish rock musician Kim Larsen. It was released in 1985. The concert recorded for the album took place on 14 April 1984. However though, the album is not entirely live, the first and last song on the album are studio recordings.

In Denmark, Kim i cirkus was the second-best album selling album of 1985.

== Track listing ==
All tracks by Kim Larsen, except where noted.

Side one

1. "Rita (Maj 45)" (Kim Larsen, Erik Clausen) - 3:30
2. "Dagen før" - 4:15
3. "Køb bananer" - 6:50
4. "Papirsklip" - 3:35
5. "Østre Gasværk" - 2:50
6. "Midt om natten" - 4:50

Side two

1. "Det er idag et vejr" (Ludvig Holstein, Poul Schierbeck) - 2:40
2. "Blip båt" - 5:20
3. "Kringsat av fjender" (Nordahl Grieg, Otto Mortensen) - 3:50
4. "Kvinde min" (Gasolin') - 3:20
5. "Susan himmelblå" - 4:35
6. "Caroline" (Ole Christensen) - 1:10
7. "Sømanden Will den fromme" (Eddie Russel) - 3:20
