= The Black Box (album) =

Box set by Gasolin'
- Released: 2003
- Recorded: 1971–1977
- Genre: Rock
- Length: 9 CDs. Ca 360 minutes.
- Label: Columbia

Gasolin' chronology
A Foreign Affair II (2002)	The Black Box (2003)

The Black Box is a box set album by Gasolin'. It was released in 2003, and contains the original seven studio albums they released between 1971 and 1977, the live album, Live sådan (but for some reason not Live i Skandinavien) and Additional tracks. The latter contains 19 songs, 18 rare and four of the songs are previously unreleased.

Several other rare tracks such as "Endelig jul igen" and "Where Do We Go Now, Mon Ami" are for some reason absent. The Black Box was a big seller and confirmed that Gasolin' is the most popular rock band in Denmark ever.

The Black Box is not the first box set with Gasolin'. In 1981 A Box Full of Gas was released containing Gas 5, Efter endnu en dag, Gør det noget and an EP with these songs: "Marken er høstet", "Skru op", "Som et strejf af en dråbe" and "Det er en kold tid".

- Gasolin' (1971) CBS 64685
- Gasolin' 2 (1972) CBS 65229
- Gasolin' 3 (1973) CBS 65798
- Stakkels Jim (1974) CBS 80549
- Gas 5 (1975) CBS 80993
- Live sådan (1976 - live record) CBS 88207
- Efter endnu en dag (1976) CBS 81650
- Gør det noget (1977) CBS 82378
- Additional tracks:
  1. "Blood Brothers"
  2. "Uh-Lu-La-Lu"
  3. "Sophie, The Bass Player"
  4. "In The Wings"
  5. "Jailbait"
  6. "Skru op"
  7. "Silky Sally"
  8. "W.J."
  9. "Lille Susanne, drømmer du"
  10. "Snow Queen"
  11. "Child of Institution"
  12. "Langebro" (live version)
  13. "Lady Rain"
  14. "Holy Jean"
  15. "Dejlig er jorden"
  16. "Campingvognen"
  17. "Hvad gør vi nu, lille du" (omitted from the Live sådan cd release.)
  18. "Som et strejf af en dråbe"
  19. "Boogie Jam".
- The Black Box has a booklet written by Klaus Lynggaard and the nine cds were remastered by Franz Beckerlee. The original cover art has been tastefully repacked.

== Certifications ==
Region	Certification	Certified units/sales
Denmark (IFPI Danmark)	8× Platinum	320,000^{^}
^{^} Shipments figures based on certification alone.
