= Song of Times =

Studio album by Starcastle
- Released: March 13, 2007
- Studios: Pogo Studios, Champaign, Ill.
- Genre: Progressive rock
- Length: 51:55
- Label: Progrock Records
- Producers: Gary Strater, Mark Rubel and Al Lewis

Starcastle chronology
Chronos I (2001)	Song of Times (2007)

Song of Times is the fifth and final studio album by American progressive rock band Starcastle.

== Release ==
Song of Times was released in 2007, three years after the death of bassist and founding member Gary Strater. It featured members from all eras of the group, as well as artwork by Annie Haslam and Ed Unitsky. It was very well received by fans and critics alike.

== Track listing ==
All songs written by Gary Strater, Bruce Botts and George Harp, except where noted.

1. "Red Season" – 5:28
2. "Babylon" – 9:24
3. "Song of Times" – 6:04 (Gary Strater)
4. "Islands" – 4:59
5. "Faces of Change" – 4:56
6. "Love Is The Only Place" – 4:27 (Steve Hagler/Matt Stewart/Al Lewis)
7. "Master Machine" – 4:24
8. "All For The Thunder" – 6:06 (Steve Hagler/Matt Stewart/Gary Strater)
9. "Children Believe" – 6:26 (Gary Strater/Bruce Botts/George Harp/Scott McKenzie)
10. "Babylon (edited)" – 4:37

== Personnel ==
=== Starcastle ===
- Gary Strater – Bass guitar, Taurus pedals (all except 3), background vocals (1, 2, 5, 6, 7, 8), keyboards (3)
- Matt Stewart – Electric sitar, acoustic and electric guitars (all songs), background vocals (1, 6, 7, 8)
- Bruce Botts – Guitar (1, 2, 4, 5, 7, 9), background vocals (5)
- Herb Schildt – Keyboards (1, 2, 6, 7, 8)
- Steve Tassler – Drums (6, 8), percussion (1, 4, 5), synthesizers (4), background vocals (1, 2, 6, 8)
- Steve Hagler – Guitar (6), background vocals (1, 4, 7)
- Terry Luttrell – Lead vocals (8), background vocals (7)

=== Other musicians ===
- Al Lewis – Lead vocals (all except 8), background vocals (all except 8), drums (9) and percussion (8)
- John O'Hara – Keyboards (3, 4, 9)
- Neal Robinson – Keyboards (5, 6, 8)
- Mark McGee – Guitar (1, 4, 7)
- Jeff Koehnke – Drums (2, 5)
- Scott McKenzie – Drums (1, 4, 7)
