= Live sådan =

Live album by Gasolin'
- Released: 21 June 1976
- Recorded: January 1976 by Sweet Silence Mobile Studio
- Genre: Rock
- Length: 77:57
- Languages: Danish, English
- Label: CBS
- Producers: Franz Beckerlee, Roy Thomas Baker

Gasolin' chronology
Gas 5 (1975)	Live sådan (1976)	Efter endnu en dag (1976)

Singles from Live sådan
- 1. "Hva' gør vi nu, lille du?" Released: 1976

Live sådan is a live album by Gasolin', released in June 1976 as a double LP album. It was recorded during their winter tour of Denmark in January 1976.

It was the first of three official live album releases by Gasolin' and it is considered to be the definitive one. The other live albums are Live i Skandinavien and Derudaf Forever. Live sådan was produced by Franz Beckerlee and Roy Thomas Baker and engineered by Freddy Hansson. It was the first Gasolin' album to be recorded in Sweet Silence Mobile Studio. The majority of the songs from this live recording was taken from Stakkels Jim and Gas 5.

Live sådan contains 14 live songs and one studio song: "Hva' gør vi nu, lille du?". The studio song was omitted when Live sådan was released on compact disc in 1989. Live sådan is also included in The Black Box box set. Live sådan contains two songs not written by Gasolin' themselves: "Keep on Knockin'" by Perry Bradford and made famous by Little Richard, and "Sort, sort, sort" which is an old Danish folk song.

"Hva' gør vi nu, lille du?" was released as a single with "Keep on Knockin'" as the B side.

== Track listing ==
=== Side one ===
1. "Good Time Charlie" - 4:55
2. "Kap Farvel til Umannarssuaq" - 5:38
3. "Legenden om Joshua og Ming" - 9:28

=== Side two ===
1. "Masser af Succes" - 3:49
2. "Kvinde Min" - 5:13
3. "Splittergal" - 4:29
4. "Sjagge" - 3:51
5. "Sort, sort, sort" - 2:03

=== Side three ===
1. "Alla-Tin-Gala" - 12:36
2. "The Last Jim" - 3:48
3. Medley: "Fi-Fi Dong" / "Det var Inga, Katinka og smukke Charlie på sin Harley" - 4:01

=== Side four ===
1. "Rabalderstræde" - 5:31
2. "Keep on Knockin'" - 3:41
3. "Refrainet er Frit" - 5:13
4. "Hva' gør vi nu, lille du?" - 3:34

== Personnel ==
=== Gasolin' ===
- Kim Larsen - vocals, rhythm guitar
- Franz Beckerlee - guitar, backup vocals
- Wili Jønsson - bass, piano, backup vocals
- Søren Berlev - drums

=== Production ===
- Engineered by Freddy Hansson
- Mixed in Sarm Studios, London, April 1976
- Mix engineer Gary Lyons and Ric Curtin
- Produced by Franz Beckerlee and Roy Thomas Baker
