= Terry Luttrell =

American rock singer/musician

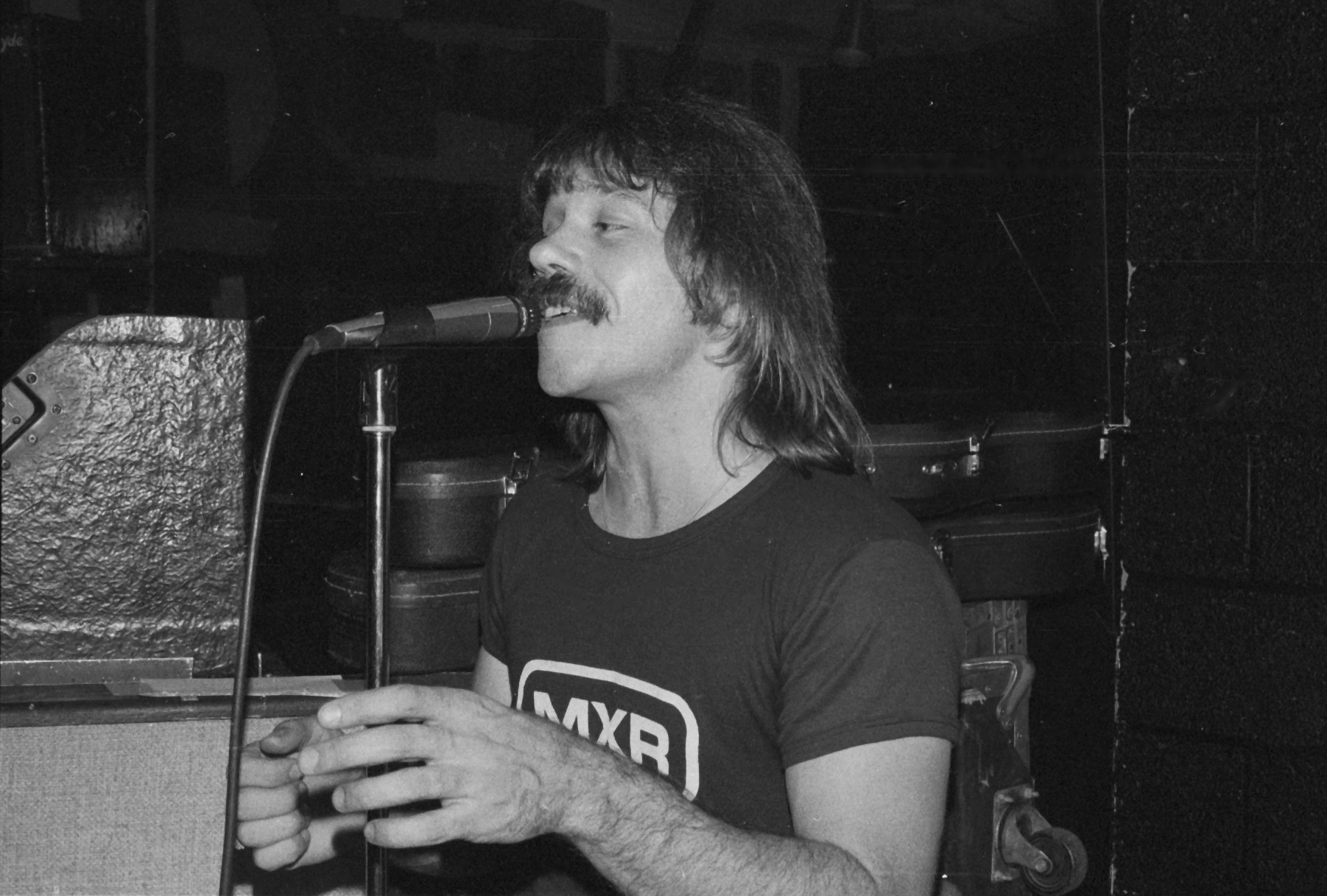
- Luttrell with Starcastle in 1977.

Background information
- Born: June 10, 1947 (age 79); Champaign, IL
- Genres: Blues rock, progressive rock
- Occupations: Musician, songwriter
- Instrument: Vocals
- Years active: 1968–1978, 2000s-present
- Member of: REO Classics Band
- Formerly of: REO Speedwagon, Starcastle
- Website: reoclassicsband.com

Terry Luttrell (born June 10, 1947) is an American rock singer, best known as lead vocalist for both REO Speedwagon (1968–1972) and Starcastle (1974–1978).

== Bands ==
Luttrell had played guitar with a local Champaign, Illinois, band, Terry Cook and the Majestics, in the early to mid-1960s.

In 1968, Terry joined REO Speedwagon, replacing Mike Blair on vocals, at the University of Illinois. He sang on the band's debut album, which was released in October 1971 on Epic Records. Personal differences between Luttrell and REO Speedwagon's lead guitarist, Gary Richrath, led to Luttrell leaving the band in 1972. He was replaced by Kevin Cronin before the recording of the second album, R.E.O./T.W.O. Although not given credit, Luttrell claims he co-wrote the song Golden Country with Richrath.

Luttrell would go on to sing for the progressive band Starcastle on the albums Starcastle, Fountains of Light, Citadel, and Reel to Real, before the band folded in the late 1970s. Luttrell briefly returned to music in the 2000s to contribute to Starcastle's studio reunion, and can be heard on two tracks from their resulting 2007 album Song of Times.

After a period of inactivity beginning in the 1980s during which he became a FedEx driver, Luttrell returned to music as the lead vocalist for the Champaign-based band "Tons O' Fun" in the early 2010s. He has also produced albums for bands such as the country group South Of Georgia and classic rock revival band Jett. As of 2026, Luttrell leads the REO Classics Band, which primarily performs songs from REO Speedwagon's first two albums, as well as later hits and other rock covers.

== Personal life ==
In the early 1980s, Luttrell became a born-again Christian, citing the personal influence of local contemporaries Champaign.

On June 15, 2025, the morning after current and former REO Speedwagon members performed a farewell concert at the State Farm Center in Champaign, Luttrell reportedly fell asleep while driving a car on Interstate 57. He stated that the car was "totaled," but he managed to walk away from it with only back and neck pain and was treated at Urbana's Carle Foundation Hospital for a cracked sternum caused by a deployed airbag. He added that he had very little sleep following the concert, having to sign autographs for hours and waking up early for a business trip to St. Louis.

== Discography ==
=== REO Speedwagon ===
- REO Speedwagon (1971)

=== Starcastle ===
- Starcastle (1976)
- Fountains of Light (1977)
- Citadel (1978)
- Real to Reel (1979)
