= C, The Complete Reference =

Book by Russ Walter

- Author: Herbert Schildt
- Language: English
- Release number: 4
- Subject: Computer
- Genre: Computer Programming
- Publisher: McGraw Hill
- Publication date: 1987 (first)
- Publication place: United States
- English publication date: May 17, 2000 (4th edition)
- Pages: 805
- ISBN: 978-0072121247
- Website: herbschildt.com

C, The Complete Reference is a book on computer programming written by Herbert Schildt. The book gives an in-depth coverage of the C programming language and function library features.

The first edition was released by Osbourne in 1987. The current edition is the 4th, with the last revision being on January 13, 2018.

== See also ==
- The Art of Computer Programming
