= Live i Skandinavien =

Live album by Gasolin'
- Released: November 1978
- Recorded: January – August 1978; Sweet Silence Mobile Studio
- Genre: Rock
- Length: 42:08
- Label: Columbia
- Producer: Tommy Bogs and Gasolin'

Gasolin' chronology
Killin' Time (1978)	Live i Skandinavien (1978)	Supermix 1 (1980)

Live i Skandinavien is a live album by Danish rock band Gasolin' that was released in November 1978.

Gasolin' broke up in 1978, and played their last concert in Malmö (Sweden) on 21 August. Live i Skandinavien (AKA Gøglernes aften) was recorded during their last tour, during their shows in Norway and Sweden.

The album is dominated by songs from their 1977 album Gør det Noget. "This is My Life" is played in a different, faster arrangement than the studio version from Efter Endnu en dag. "Rabalderstræde" is the only song repeated from their first live album Live Sådan. The last song, "Dråben", is better known as "Som et strejf af en dråbe".

Live i Skandinavien was released on LP in red, blue, yellow and black vinyl in 1978, and on CD in 1989. It was produced by Gasolin' and Tommy Bogs, engineered by Freedy Hansson and Flemming Rasmussen, and recorded by the Sweet Silence Mobile Studio.

== Track list ==
1. "Stakkels Jim" - 3:14
2. "Get on the Train" - 3:21
3. "Det Bedste til Mig og Mine Venner" - 5:14
4. "This is My Life" - 3:28
5. "Jumbo Nummer Nul" - 5:24
6. "Strengelegen" - 4:04
7. "Hvad Gør Vi Nu, Lille Du" - 5:46
8. "Rabalderstræde" - 8:54
9. "Dråben" - 2:36

== Credits ==
=== Gasolin' ===
- Kim Larsen - vocals, rhythm guitar
- Franz Beckerlee - guitar, backup vocals
- Wili Jønsson - bass, piano, backup vocals
- Søren Berlev - drums
- Klaus Agerschou - keyboards
- Recorded and mixed in Sweet Silence Mobile Studio during 1978
- Engineered by Freddy Hansson and Flemming Rasmussen
- Produced by Tommy Bogs and Gasolin'
