= Espionage (band) =

Pop band (1983–1985)

- Genres: Commercial pop Synth-pop
- Years active: 1983–1985
- Labels: A&M Records, Elektra Records
- Past members: Chazz Coghlan, Paul Hutchinson, Nielson Kearon, Gordon Goodwin, Dennis Conway

Espionage was a pop band formed in 1983 and dissolved in 1985. The band released two albums: a self-titled debut album in 1983. and ESP in 1985. The band is best known for their 1983 song "The Sound of Breaking Hearts", along with its music video. Their debut album was produced by Roy Thomas Baker.

== Discography ==
- Espionage (1983, A&M Records)
- ESP (1985, Elektra Records)
