= A Foreign Affair (2003 film) =

- Directed by: Helmut Schleppi
- Written by: Geert Heetebrij
- Produced by: Helmut Schleppi, Esli Bijker
- Starring: David Arquette; Tim Blake Nelson; Emily Mortimer; Lois Smith; Megan Follows; Larry Piney
- Cinematography: M. David Mullen
- Edited by: Helmut Schleppi
- Music by: Todd Holden Capps
- Distributed by: Innovation Film Group
- Release date: January 21, 2003
- Running time: 1 hour 34 minutes
- Country: United States
- Language: English

A Foreign Affair is a 2003 film directed by Helmut Schleppi. The film takes place during an actual romance tour, with attendees, as actors and extras throughout the film.

== Plot ==
Two brothers need household help after their Ma passes away. They decide to join a romance tour to Russia to find, and bring home a traditionally minded wife.
