= Starcastle (album) =

Studio album by Starcastle
- Released: February 1976
- Recorded: Golden Voice Studios, Pekin, Illinois
- Genre: Progressive rock
- Length: 39:39
- Label: Epic Records
- Producer: Tommy Vicari

Starcastle chronology
Starcastle (1976)	Fountains of Light (1977)

Starcastle is the first studio album by American progressive rock band Starcastle.

== Reception ==
Professional ratings
Review scores
Source	Rating
AllMusic	3/5 stars

Paul Collins of AllMusic gave the album three stars out of five. He commented that the album was a "decent enough debut" but also said that later records would show that the band was capable of better. Collins also called the album's leadoff track, "Lady Of The Lake", "a wonderfully sprawling song" and an "epic". The album entered US Billboard on March 13, 1976, eventually reaching No. 95.

== Track listing ==
All tracks are written by Starcastle

Side 1
No.	Title	Length
1.	"Lady of the Lake"	10:26
2.	"Elliptical Season"	4:27
3.	"Forces"	6:25
Total length:		21:18

Side 2
No.	Title	Length
1.	"Stargate"	2:54
2.	"Sunfield"	7:36
3.	"To the Fire Wind"	5:16
4.	"Nova"	2:35
Total length:		18:21

== Credits ==
Credits adapted from album jacket

=== Band ===
- Terry Luttrell - lead vocals
- Gary Strater - backing vocals, bass guitar, bass pedals
- Stephen Tassler - backing vocals, drums, percussion
- Herb Schildt - piano, synthesizer, organ
- Matthew Stewart - backing vocals, electric guitar
- Stephen Hagler - backing vocals, electric guitar

=== Production ===
- Tommy Vicari - producer, engineer
- Norm Kinney - engineer
- Ed Lee - art direction
- David Gulick - photography
- Alex Ebel - artwork
