= Mine damer og herrer =

Studio album by Kim Larsen
- Released: 3 May 2010
- Recorded: 2010
- Label: EMI

Kim Larsen chronology
Hvem kan sige nej til en engel (1994)	Mine damer og herrer (2010)

Mine damer og herrer is a 2010 studio album by Danish singer Kim Larsen. It was released on 3 May 2010 on EMI, and was Larsen's first solo album since his 1994 album Hvem kan sige nej til en engel.

It was a huge success on Tracklisten, the official Danish Albums Chart where it stayed at #1 for 7 consecutive weeks (weeks 18-24/2010).

== Track listing ==
1. "Udenfor døren"
2. "Hold ud"
3. "Stud Poker"
4. "Botox & Silicone"
5. "Kom igen"
6. "Danser med dig"
7. "Du er min"
8. "Næ, næ, næ"
9. "Blå lanterne"
10. "Bitter frugt"
11. "Har du hørt"
12. "Mit et og alt"
13. "Giv mig en chance"
14. "Mænd med måner"

== Charts ==
Chart (2010)	Peak position
Danish Album Chart	1

== Certifications ==
Region	Certification	Certified units/sales
Denmark (IFPI Danmark)	5× Platinum	100,000^{‡}
^{‡} Sales+streaming figures based on certification alone.
