= Alive Beyond Recognition =

Studio album by Steve Tassler
- Released: 2002
- Studio: The Creatorie, Libertyville, Illinois
- Genre: Neo-prog
- Length: 51:50
- Label: Sunsinger Records
- Producer: Steve Tassler

Alive Beyond Recognition is a solo album by former Starcastle drummer Steve Tassler. It was released in 2002 on Sunsinger Records.

== Track listing ==
The album contains nine tracks.

1. "Reunion" – 5:53
2. "Liquid Euphoria" – 4:55
3. "Firebright" – 6:49
4. "And Still She Wonders" – 3:49
5. "Bring the Promise" – 4:46
6. "Aeon's Arrival" – 4:44
7. "Interregnum" – 13:45
8. "Foreshadow" – 0:42
9. "In the Night" – 6:27

== Personnel ==
- Steve Tassler – Composition, performances, programming and production.
- Mastering by Jon Schoenoff at Krannert Audio, Urbana, Illinois.
- Art Direction & Design by Dick Detzner
