= Efter endnu en dag =

Studio album by Gasolin'
- Released: 3 November 1976
- Recorded: August–September 1976 at Sweet Silence Studios, Copenhagen, and Trente Mølle in Funen
- Genre: Rock
- Length: 37:14
- Language: Danish, English
- Label: CBS
- Producer: Roy Thomas Baker

Gasolin' chronology
Live sådan (1976)	Efter endnu en dag (1976)	Gør det noget (1977)

Singles from Efter endnu en dag
- 1. "Sirenesangen" Released: 1976; 2. "Pas på svinget i Solrød" Released: 1976

Efter endnu en dag ("After Yet Another Day" in English) is the sixth studio album by Gasolin' and was released in November 1976. It was the last Gasolin' album to be produced by Roy Thomas Baker.

In Efter endnu en dag the bombastic rock of Stakkels Jim and Gas 5 was replaced by a more eclectic sound, making this album their equivalent of Sgt. Pepper's Lonely Hearts Club Band.

"Pilli villi" and "Pas på svinget i solrød" are up-tempo rock songs, while "De fem årstider" and "This Is My Life" are ballads. In between are sing-along pop hymns such as "Sirenesangen" and swing jazz songs such as "Bella Donna". "Stenalderjazz" is an instrumental played by a symphony ensemble arranged by Palle Mikkelborg.

The title song and "De gule enker" would surface again on Killin' Time as "Closer" and "Magic Garden". "This Is My Life" can be heard in an up-tempo rock version on Kim Larsen's Kim Larsen og Yankee drengene (1978) and Live i Skandinavien (1978).

It was engineered by Freddy Hansson and recorded in Sweet Silence Studio in Copenhagen and Trente Mølle in Funen. From this album "Sirenesangen" / "De gule enker" and "Pas på svinget i solrød" / "Bella Donna" were released as singles.

Efter endnu en dag was released on CD in 1987 with Gas 5 but due to lack of space, "Mama Cucu", "Twilight Birds", and "Stenalderjazz" were omitted. In 1991 it was remastered for CD and it is also included on The Black Box (2003). Efter endnu en dag was released in Spain as Al cerrarse un nuevo dia with song titles in Spanish translation, but sung in Danish.

== Reception ==
Efter endnu en dag was not well received by critics, but the album attained platinum.

== Track list ==
All songs written by Gasolin', lyrics by Gasolin' and Mogens Mogensen except where noted.

1. "Pilli Villi" (Gasolin', Wendorf-Mogensen) – 3:23
2. "Mamma CuCu" (Gasolin', Beck-Moloney) – 2:55
3. "Bella Donna" – 2:45
4. "Kloden drejer stille rundt" – 4:04
5. "De gule enker" – 1:42
6. "Sirenesangen" – 4:35
7. "Twilight Birds" (Gasolin', Moloney) – 2:54
8. "Tantes foto" – 2:26
9. "De fem årstider" – 3:10
10. "Pas på svinget i Solrød" (Gasolin', Steensted-Mogensen) – 2:37
11. "Stenalderjazz" (Gasolin') – 2:57
12. "This Is My Life" (Gasolin', Beck, Moloney) – 3:38

Note: M. Mogensen, D. Beck and M. Moloney co-wrote the lyrics with Gasolin'.

== Personnel ==
=== Gasolin' ===
- Søren Berlev – drums
- Franz Beckerlee – guitar
- Wili Jønsson – bass guitar
- Kim Larsen – vocals

=== Additional Personnel ===
- Anne Linnet and Lis Sørensen – backup vocals on "Mamma Cucu" and "Twllight Birds"
- Birgitte Lindhardt – vocal solo on "This Is My Life"
- Fessors Big City Band: (Finn Otto Hansen, Steen Vig, Elith "Nulle" Nykjær, Ole "Fessor" Linggreen, Torben "Plys" Petersen, Ole Skipper Mosgaard, Thorkild Møller & "Bageren") on "Bella Donna"
- Producer – Roy Thomas Baker
- Engineer – Freddy Hansson
- Assistant engineer – Flemming Rasmussen
