= Romance tours =

Romance tours are tours that men take in search of a relationship, girlfriend, or even a marriage. In some such tours, the men and potential brides interact in brief parties arranged by the hosting company.

A large number of romance tours take place every year throughout the world. Romance tours first began in Russia and other Commonwealth of Independent States countries, but have recently moved into other parts of the world, such as South America. Tours also take place in many parts of Asia.

Once couples have met on a romance tour, an agency arranges "one-on-one" dates between the man and the woman he found most compatible. The ultimate goal of the tour is for the man to find a compatible wife.

Romance tours are just one part of the mail-order bride business, which may also include catalogs, CD-ROMs, and the internet. The traditional romance tour, seen by some as superficial, is being somewhat replaced by online dating as technology evolves. However, the two are closely linked, as a man eventually has to meet his prospective wife using a well-organized method of meeting and dating.

Romance tours should not be confused with sex tourism, because the ultimate goal of a sex tourist is usually not marriage.

== See also ==
- A Foreign Affair (company)
- Female sex tourism
- Mail order brides
- Love Translated - a 2010 documentary film in which a group of men travel to Ukraine on a romance tour.
