= Gasolin' 2 =

Album by Gasolin'

Studio album by Gasolin'
- Released: 15 November 1972
- Recorded: Mid 1972 at Rosenberg Studio, Copenhagen
- Genre: Rock
- Length: 39:05
- Language: Danish
- Label: CBS
- Producer: Gasolin', Sture Lindén, Poul Bruun

Gasolin' chronology
Gasolin' (1971)	Gasolin' 2 (1972)	Gasolin' 3 (1973)

Singles from Gasolin' 2
- 1. "På en sommerdag" Released: 1972; 2. "Derudaf" Released: 1973

Gasolin' 2 is the second album by Danish rock band Gasolin', released in 1972 and received very well by the critics and the public. Musically they would loosen up after the sombre music of their debut album. "På en sommerdag", "Fi-fi dong" and "På banen" are up-tempo and jolly rock songs that would become popular in concert. "Se din by fra tårnets top", "Snehvide" (Snow white) and "Nanna" are slower songs with lyrics inspired by left-wing humanity. The latter song was also released on Kim Larsen's Værsgo (1973). Overall, Gasolin' 2 has a laid back and cosy ambience.

Gasolin' 2 has one song not written by the band: "Min tøs" that is better known as "Where Did You Sleep Last Night" by Lead Belly. From this album "På en sommerdag" / "Se din by fra tårnets top" and "På banen" / "Min tøs" were released as singles. The cover album drawing was by Peder Bundgaard, he would go on to make their future album covers as well (with the exception of Gør det noget).

Gasolin' 2 was produced by Gasolin', Sture Lindén and Poul Bruun and engineered by Freddy Hansson in Rosenberg Studio in Copenhagen. It was released on cd in 1987 with their debut album, but due to lack of space "Snehvide" was omitted. In 1991 it was remastered for CD and it was also included in The Black Box (2003).

== Track listing ==
=== Side one ===
1. "På en sommerdag" (Wili Jönsson, Kim Larsen, Franz Beckerlee / Jönsson, Larsen, Beckerlee, Mogens Mogensen) – 4:11
2. "Se din by fra tårnets top" (Jönsson, Larsen, Beckerlee / Larsen, Mogensen) – 4:18
3. "Fi-fi dong" (Larsen) – 3:28
4. "Snehvide" (Jönsson, Larsen, Beckerlee / Beckerlee) – 5:19
5. "Nanna" (Larsen / Flemming Quist-Møller) – 1:58

=== Side two ===
1. "Druktur nr. 1234" (Jönsson, Larsen, Beckerlee) – 4:33
2. "På banen (derudaf)" (Jönsson, Larsen / Larsen, Beckerlee, Mogensen) – 3:48
3. "Balladen om Provo Knud" (Jönsson, Beckerlee / Jönsson, Beckerlee, Mogensen) – 3:19
4. "Hvorfor er der aldrig nogen der tør tage en chance" (Larsen / Larsen, Beckerlee) – 4:34
5. "Min tøs" (Ledbetter, Gasolin' / Larsen, Beckerlee) – 2:55

== Credits ==
=== Gasolin' ===
- Kim Larsen – vocals, acoustic guitar, electric rhythm guitar, slide guitar
- Franz Beckerlee – lead guitar, vocals, alto saxophone, harmonica
- Wili Jønsson – bass, piano, organ, vocals, acoustic guitar, percussion
- Søren Berlev – drums, percussion

=== Additional musicians ===
- Sture Lindén – percussion
- Niels Harrit – musical saw, tenor saxophone, piano

=== Production ===
- Gasolin' – producer
- Sture Lindén – producer
- Poul Bruun – producer
- Freddy Hansson – engineer
- Roger Beale – mixing in CBS New Sound Studios, London
