= A Foreign Affair (company) =

International dating and marriage agency

- Industry: International Marriage Broker, Romance Tour Company
- Founded: 1995
- Headquarters: Phoenix, Arizona, United States
- Area served: United States, Russia, Ukraine, Latin America, Thailand, Philippines, China
- Key people: John Adams (Owner), Ron Redburn (Owner), Ken Agee (CTO)
- Website: loveme.com

A Foreign Affair (AFA) is an international dating and marriage agency that promotes romance tours for American men to meet women in Latin America, Southeast Asia, China, Russia, and other CIS countries.

== Critical reception ==
A feature on ABC's Nightline covered an AFA meetup in Odesa, Ukraine and found that, while many of the women who attended the meetup were genuinely interested in finding an ideal match with an American man, others seemed to be taking advantage of the men by attempting to convince them to buy expensive gifts. In the segment, owner John Adams does not dispute the fact that some men may fall victim to scamming, though he says that such instances are rare.

A BBC reporter also attended a meetup in Ukraine and interviewed several attendees, finding that many of the men attended because they were frustrated with the prospects of finding a partner in the US, while many women attended in search of a partner who was responsible and could provide them with a better life.

A 2011 The Today Show segment featured AFA and one of its founders in light of the mail-order bride industry's growth following the 2008 recession. The segment explored some common negative perceptions about the mail-order bride industry, including concerns that relationships precipitated by websites like AFA might not be completely equal; for instance, the host noted that women might be pushed into such relationships due to socioeconomic factors out of their control.

AFA was also featured in a National Geographic documentary called Bachelors Abroad, a feature documentary called Love Me, Our America with Lisa Ling, and an episode of MTV's Sex 2K, all of which raised serious questions about the legitimacy of many of the women involved.
