= Værsgo =

Studio album by Kim Larsen
- Released: 1973
- Recorded: Wifoss Studio, Copenhagen
- Genre: Rock
- Length: 47:00
- Language: Danish
- Label: CBS
- Producer: Poul Bruun

Kim Larsen chronology
Værsgo (1973)	Kim Larsen og Yankee drengene (1977)

Værsgo is the debut album of Kim Larsen who formed Gasolin' in 1969 with Wili Jønsson and Franz Beckerlee. It was released in 1973 while he was still a member of Gasolin', and the album contains songs which were not found suitable for Gasolin'. With 17 songs, it was apparent that Kim Larsen had a lot of songs to offer. It is also apparent why these songs did not fit into the Gasolin' frame. Unlike the hard and disciplined rock of Gasolin' the songs on Værsgo have a loose and cosy atmosphere with a lot of romance and sentimentality and childlike innocence. The album became a big surprise hit and it is considered to be a classic in Danish popular music. In 2005 the 17 songs were re-recorded by various Danish artists under the title: Værsgo 2. This album became a big seller too, confirming the iconic status of Værsgo. Værsgo was recorded in Wifoss studio in Copenhagen and produced by Poul Bruun. All the members of Gasolin' played on the album: Franz Beckerlee played the Moog, Wili Jønsson played the piano and organ and Søren Berlev played the percussion.

== Track listing ==
All songs written by Kim Larsen except where noted.

Side one

1. "Nanna" (Larsen / Grete Quist Holm) 1:47
2. "Hubertus" (Unknown) 3:04
3. "Joanna" 2:49
4. "Det er i dag et Vejr" (Poul Schierbeck / Ludvig Holstein) 2:05
5. "Byens Hotel" (Trad. / Larsen, Mogens Mogensen, Thomas Grue) 2:49
6. "Det rager mig en Bønne" 0:54
7. "Blaffersangen" 3:07
8. "Sylvesters Drøm" 5:14

Side two

1. "Hvis din Far giver dig lov" (Larsen / Mogensen) 3:18
2. "Guleroden" 4:04
3. "Maria" (Larsen, Ole Christensen) 1:46
4. "Er du jol mon!!!" 2:04
5. "Den Rige og den Fattige Pige" (Stig Møller / Trad.) 2:54
6. "De Fjorten Astronauter" (Larsen, Ole Alstrup Frederiksen) 2:15
7. "På en gren i Vort Kvarter" (Larsen / Mogensen) 2:36
8. "Jacob den Glade" (Davies, Pete Seeger / Larsen) 3:31
9. "Christianhavns Kanal" (Larsen / Flemming Quist Møller) 2:08

== Personnel ==
- Kim Larsen

with

- Franz Beckerlee - Moog
- Wili Jønsson - Piano, organ
- Søren Berlev - Percussion
- Søren Bernbom - Vocal

== Chart performance ==
In Denmark, Værsgo peaked at #6.

== Certifications ==
Region	Certification	Certified units/sales
Denmark (IFPI Danmark)	Platinum	20,000^{‡}
^{‡} Sales+streaming figures based on certification alone.
