= Midt om natten (album) =

Soundtrack album by Kim Larsen
- Released: 24 November 1983
- Recorded: 1983
- Studio: Sweet Silence, Puk Recording Studios, Laid Back Studios, Custom Sound Lab, Sweat Sauna
- Genre: Rock
- Length: 38:46
- Label: Medley
- Producer: Poul Bruun; co-produced by Franz Beckerlee and Søren Wolff

Midt om natten is the fifth studio album by the Danish rock musician Kim Larsen. It was released in 1983. The album is the soundtrack to the film Midt om natten.

== Track listing ==
All tracks by Kim Larsen, except where noted.

Side one

1. "Susan himmelblå" - 3:50
2. "Papirsklip" - 3:15
3. "Haveje" (Jacob Haugaard) - 3:40
4. "Rocco" - 3:05
5. "Tik tik" - 4:45

Side two

1. "Sköna flicka" (Kim Larsen, Henning Pold) - 2:45
2. "Tiden står stille" (Larsen, Mogens Mogensen, Wili Jønsson) - 4:00
3. "1910" - 2:45
4. "Lille pige" (Larsen, Søren Berlev) - 2:55
5. "Volver volver" - 3:05
6. "Midt om natten" - 4:30

== Certifications and sales ==
Region	Certification	Certified units/sales
Denmark (IFPI Danmark)	7× Platinum	140,000^{‡}
Summaries
Scandinavia	—	650,000
^{‡} Sales+streaming figures based on certification alone.
