= Gør det noget =

Gør det Noget

Studio album by Gasolin'
- Released: 11 November 1977
- Recorded: September 1977 at Sweet Silence Studio, Copenhagen
- Genre: Rock
- Length: 38:35
- Language: Danish
- Label: CBS
- Producer: Tommy "Rocco" Bogs, Gasolin'

Gasolin' chronology
Efter Endnu en Dag (1976)	Gør det Noget (1977)	Killin' Time (1978)

Singles from Gør det Noget
- 1. "Jumbo Nummer Nul" Released: 1978; 2. "Kina Rock" Released: 1978 (Sweden)

Alternative cover
- Re-release cover

Gør det Noget is Danish rock group Gasolin's seventh studio album. When Gasolin' released Gør det Noget in November 1977 (translation: "does it matter" or "so what"), they knew it was their last album. After the ambitious Gas 5 and Efter endnu en dag, Gasolin' decided to make a garage-rock album. Therefore, the service of Roy Thomas Baker was not needed and Gør det Noget was produced by Gasolin' and "Rocco" Tommy Bogs.

Gør det Noget was recorded in Sweet Silence Studio in Copenhagen and engineered by Freddy Hansson and Flemming Rasmussen. Flemming Rasmussen would go on to produce Metallica. Gør det Noget was released on CD in 1989. It was remastered and included on The Black Box box set in 2003.

== Track listing ==
All songs written by Gasolin', lyrics by Gasolin' and Mogens Mogensen except where noted

1. "Det bedste til mig og mine venner" - 4:24
2. "Smukke Møller" - 2:20
3. "Jumbo nummer nul" - 3:25
4. "December i New York" - 2:26
5. "Place Sct. Michelle" - 3:03
6. "Strengelegen" (Gasolin') - 3:55
7. "Get on the Train" (Gasolin'/Gasolin'-O. Ahlstrup-M. Mogensen) - 2:17
8. "Kattemor" - 3:25
9. "Bob-shi-bam" (Gasolin'/Gasolin'-M. Parkvist-M. Mogensen) - 3:53
10. "Længes hjem" - 3:00
11. "Gør det noget" - 3:02
12. "Kina rock" (Gasolin') - 3:00

== Credits ==
=== Gasolin' ===
- Franz Beckerlee - guitar, moog, e-bow, vocals
- Wili Jønsson - bass, vocals, piano
- Kim Larsen - vocals, guitar, piano
- Søren Berlev - drums, vocals
- Recorded and mixed in Sweet Silence Studio during September 1977
- Engineered by Freddy Hansson and Flemming Rasmussen
- Produced by Rocco and his brothers (original credit)
