= Killin' Time (Gasolin' album) =

Studio album by Gasolin'
- Released: 1978
- Recorded: Spring 1977 at Sweet Silence Studios, Copenhagen
- Genre: Rock
- Length: 35:44
- Label: CBS
- Producer: Felix Pappalardi

Gasolin' chronology
Gør det Noget (1977)	Killin' Time (1978)	Live i Skandinavien (1978)

Singles from Killin' Time
- 1. "Girl You Got Me Lonely" Released: 1977

Killin' Time was recorded in the spring of 1977 and released in Denmark in the summer of 1978. In Sweden it was released as Tivoli. It was Gasolin's fourth and last album with English lyrics, also acting as the band's final studio album release.

Killin' Time was produced by Felix Pappalardi because Gasolin' wanted someone who could produce an "American" sound so they could break the lucrative American market. However, Gasolin' was not satisfied with Pappalardi's mix and the record company would not release it in the USA because they did not believe that Killin' Time would sell. It was shelved for a year, and then released using another mix by Franz Beckerlee. (The original Pappalardi mix can be heard in A Foreign Affair)

Killin' Time is the only of the four albums with English lyrics that include almost only original material ("Closer", "Magic Garden" and "Sing My Song" are the exceptions). Steven Lemberg wrote the lyrics and some music too. (He also wrote the lyrics to Kim Larsen's Kim Larsen og Yankee drengene (1978)). Felix Pappardi played bass and keyboards on several tracks. From this album "Girl You Got Me Lonely" / "In the Wings" were released on single in the original Felix Pappalardi mix.

Killin' Time was released on cd in 1997 as A Foreign Affair and in 2004 in its own name with the Franz Beckerlee mix. It was recorded in Sweet Silence Studio in Copenhagen with Freddy Hansson and Flemming Rasmussen. The latter would later produce Ride the Lightning, Master of Puppets and ..And Justice for All for Metallica.

== Track listing ==
1. "Girl You Got Me Lonely" (Gasolin'-Sørensen/Lemberg) - 3:02
2. "Closer" (Gasolin'/Lemberg) - 4:04
3. "Jailbait" (Lemberg) - 3:49
4. "Let It Flow" (Gasolin'-Dorf/Lemberg) - 3:30
5. "Snow Queen" (Lemberg) - 3:01
6. "Killin' Time" (Gasolin'/Lemberg) - 2:32
7. "In the Wings" (Gasolin'/Lemberg) - 3:08
8. "Highschool" (Lemberg) - 2:53
9. "Stop" (Gasolin'/Lemberg) - 2:56
10. "Sing My Song" (Gasolin'/Lemberg) - 4:32
11. "Magic Garden" (Gasolin'/Lemberg) - 1:50

== Credits ==
=== Gasolin' ===
- Franz Beckerlee - guitar, moog, e-bow, vocals
- Wili Jønsson - bass, vocals, piano
- Kim Larsen - vocals, guitar, piano
- Søren Berlev - drums, vocals
- Felix Pappalardi - bass, keyboards
- Produced by Felix Pappalardi
- Recorded at Sweet Silence Studios during spring 1977
- Engineered by Freddy Hansson and Flemming Rasmussen
- Mixed by Franz Beckerlee
