= Starcastle =

American progressive rock band

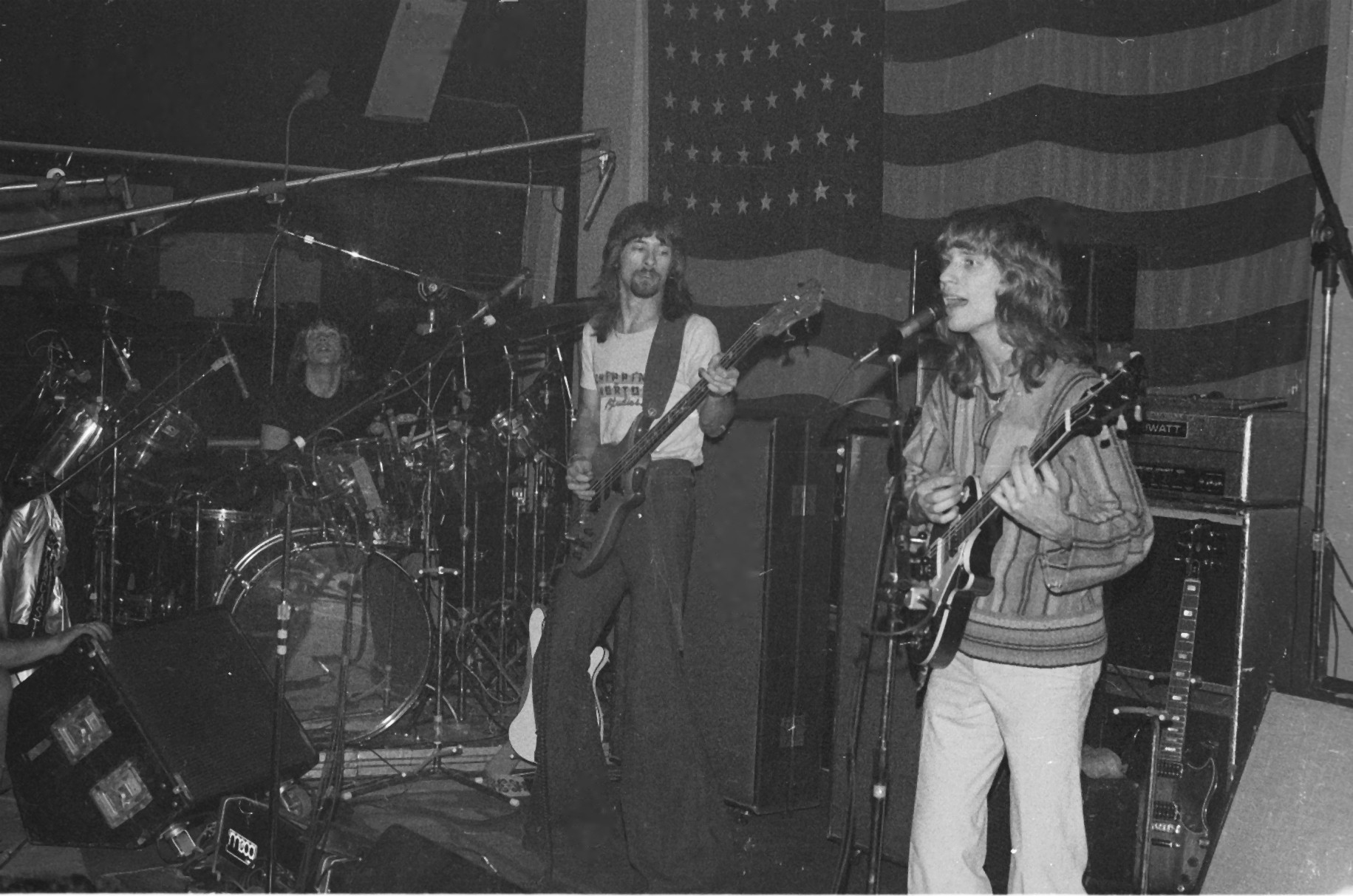
- Starcastle in 1977

Background information
- Also known as: St. James (1969–1972); Mad John Fever (1973–1974); Pegasus (1974)
- Origin: Champaign, Illinois, United States
- Genre: Progressive rock
- Years active: 1969–1980, 1982–1986, 2004, 2007
- Label: Epic Records
- Past members: Gary Strater; Herb Schildt; Steve Hagler; Mike Castlehorn; Steve Tassler; Terry Luttrell; Matt Stewart; Ralph Goldhiem; Mauro Magellan; George Harp; Bruce Botts; Scott McKenzie; Mark McGee; Jimmy Wagner; Woody Lingle; Al Lewis; Oliver Wakeman
- Website: starcastlerocks.com

Starcastle was an American progressive rock band from Champaign, Illinois, United States. Formed in 1969, the group played under many names before settling on Starcastle in 1974. They signed their first record deal with Epic Records in 1974, and released four albums on both the Epic and CBS labels. The band's debut album, Starcastle, garnered worldwide acclaim.

== History ==
=== 1969-1974: Origins ===
Starcastle, known at first as St. James, were initially a cover band, performing songs by artists such as the Grateful Dead, Dave Brubeck, and Traffic. Founded by keyboardist Herb Schildt and guitarist/flautist Steve Hagler, bassist Gary Strater and drummer Mike Castlehorn were recruited in 1969, rounding out the initial lineup. This incarnation remained stable through the early 1970s until 1972, when Castlehorn suddenly passed away in a car accident. Hagler drafted in drummer Steve Tassler, whose brother Paul had previously played bass in a pre-St. James group with Hagler and Schildt. During the summer of 1972, Schildt invested in a Minimoog synthesizer. This stylistic development, paired with greater ambition to play original songs, led to the band changing its name to Mad John Fever in 1973.

Following the brief departure of Tassler in the same period, the group toured the bar circuit in Illinois for roughly the next year, until guitarist Matt Stewart and vocalist Terry Luttrell were recruited to suit Strater and Schildt's creative vision. Roughly at this time, in 1974, the band signed to Epic Records.

=== 1975-1978: Success ===
After a year of developing brand new material and changing the band's name to Starcastle in 1974 (picked by Strater after one show under the name 'Pegasus'), the group released their self-titled debut album in 1976. While the group received radiant reviews from progressive rock circles, critics often lampooned Starcastle for sounding too musically and vocally similar to Yes.

At the band's peak from 1976 to 1978, they were openers for such bands as Jethro Tull, Gentle Giant, Fleetwood Mac, Kansas, Boston, Rush, Journey, and others. Starcastle's second and third albums, Fountains of Light and Citadel, showed a departure from the Yes influence that had hampered reception of their first album.

=== 1978-1980: Demise ===
Even while touring stadiums with larger acts, and being regionally popular in cities such as St. Louis, Missouri, their later albums, especially Real to Reel, each showed an exponential decline in sales. In late 1978, these developments, as well as a changing popular music landscape that had dulled progressive rock's commercial viability, led to Epic dropping the band. Schildt and Luttrell subsequently departed the band, and Ralph Goldheim was recruited in a dual vocalist/keyboardist role in 1979. With Goldheim, they wrote, taped videos for, and shopped around several new songs to various record labels in search of a contract. These efforts allegedly attracted the attention of 'some labels', but ultimately failed; Hagler and Tassler consequently departed Starcastle. Strater, Stewart and Goldheim continued the group temporarily with new drummer Mauro Magellan, but the group had broken up by the end of 1980.

=== 1982-1986: Second incarnation ===
In 1982, bassist Gary Strater relocated from the midwest to northern California, and reformed Starcastle with an entirely new ensemble of musicians local to the area. George Harp, vocalist, Bruce Botts, guitarist/keyboardist, and Scott McKenzie, drummer, joined Strater in a slimmed-down outfit that began performing and writing. In 1984, guitarist Mark McGee joined the fold, bringing the group back to two guitarists. However, in 1985, disillusioned with sharing guitar duties, Botts left the group and a new keyboard player, Jimmy Wagner was added. This lineup continued to record demos and perform through 1985 and 1986, until McGee and McKenzie both departed, bringing the group to an end. Starcastle had recorded demos from 1982 to 1986, though no official recordings became of them at the time.

=== 2000s: Later activity ===
In 2002, Gary Strater, Steve Tassler and Steve Hagler all released solo albums on the band's own Sunsinger label. This led to work on the band's final album, Song of Times. Work on the project hit a snag when Strater was diagnosed with pancreatic cancer in 2003. The mid-70s lineup of Starcastle, with singer Al Lewis, subsequently staged a reunion concert to help pay for Strater's medical bills. The band officially reunited on April 25th, 2004 in its hometown of Champaign in what would be Strater's final performance before his death on September 19th of that year.

Song of Times was released in 2007, and another reunion performance in April 2007 took place, which included Steve Hagler, Matt Stewart, Steve Tassler, Bruce Botts, and Al Lewis, as well as bassist Woody Lingle and keyboardist Oliver Wakeman.

=== 2018: Aborted reformation ===
In November 2018, the band's official website announced the release of Alchemy, an archive release of studio and live material from the band's 1980s lineup. Additionally, their website announced a new lineup of the band consisting of Harp and Botts, though activity stalled and no performances or new recordings have resulted.

== Members ==
- Gary Strater – bass, bass pedals, backing vocals (1969–1980, 1982–1986, 2004)
- Steve Hagler – guitar, backing vocals (1969–1980, 2004, 2007), wind instruments (1969–1973), keyboards (1979–1980)
- Herb Schildt – keyboards (1969–1978, 2004)
- Mike Castlehorn – drums (1969–1972; his death)
- Steve Tassler – drums, backing vocals (1972, 1973–1980, 2004, 2007)
- unknown – guitar (1972–1973)
- unknown – drums (1972)
- Matt Stewart – guitar, backing vocals (1974–1980, 2004, 2007)
- Terry Luttrell – lead vocals (1974–1978)
- Ralph Goldheim ("Caribou Ralph") – lead vocals, keyboards (1979–1980)
- Mauro Magellan – drums (1980)
- Bruce Botts – guitar, keyboards, vocals (1982–1985, 2007)
- Scott McKenzie – drums, backing vocals (1982–1986)
- Mark McGee – guitar (1984–1986)
- Jimmy Wagner – keyboards (1985–1986)
- George Harp – lead vocals (1982–1986)
- Al Lewis – lead vocals (2004, 2007)
- Woody Lingle – bass (2007)
- Oliver Wakeman – keyboards (2007)

== Discography ==
=== Starcastle studio albums ===
- Starcastle (1976)
- Fountains of Light (1977; CD 1998)
- Citadel (1977; CD 1998)
- Real to Reel (1978; CD 1998)
- Song of Times (2007)

=== Other studio releases ===
- Chronos I (2001; recorded 1976–77)
- Alchemy (2018; recorded 1982–86)

=== Live ===
- Alive In America: Live 1978 (2006)

=== Solo releases ===
- Gary Strater – Eleven to the Fourth Twice (2002)
- Steve Tassler – Alive Beyond Recognition (2002)
- Steve Hagler, Carol Hagler – Echoes of Light (2002)
