= Personal identification number (Denmark) =

Danish national identification number

The Danish Personal Identification number (personnummer or informally Danish: CPR-nummer, Greenlandic: CPR-normu or inuup-normua) is a national identification number, which is part of the personal information stored in the Civil Registration System (Danish: Det Centrale Personregister, Greenlandic: Inunnik Qitiusumik Nalunaarsuiffik).

The register was established in 1968 by combining information from all the municipal civil registers of Denmark into one. The register came into force by royal assent in Greenland with the effect from 1 July 1972.

It is a ten-digit number with the format DDMMYY-SSSS, where DDMMYY is the date of birth and SSSS is a sequence number. The first digit of the sequence number encodes the century of birth (so that centenarians are distinguished from infants), and the last digit of the sequence number is odd for males and even for females.

== Requisition ==
Any person registered as of 2 April 1968 (1 May 1972 in Greenland) or later in a Danish civil register, receives a personal identification number. Any person who is a member of ATP or is required to pay tax in Denmark according to the Tax-control Law of Denmark, but is not registered in a civil register, also receives a personal identification number.

Since the 2010s the civil register lists persons who:

- Are born in Denmark including Greenland, or
- Have their birth, baptism, wedding or ecclesiastical blessing of civil marriage registered in ’Dansk Elektronisk Kirkebog (DNK)’ (Danish electronic church-book), or
- Are mother to a child born in Denmark, but not prior registered with an address in Denmark, or
- Are an unmarried father to a child born in Denmark, who recognizes the paternity for the child, or
- Reside legally in Denmark or Greenland for 3 months or more (non-Nordic citizens must also have a residence permit), or
- Is required to pay tax in Denmark, or
- Die in Denmark without previously having obtained a personal identification number.

Danish citizens, including newborn babies, who are entitled to Danish citizenship, but are living abroad, do not receive a personal ID number, unless they move to Denmark or Greenland or are baptised in the Church of Denmark in Denmark.

== New development in 2007 ==
The sequence numbers used to be chosen (and still are, preferentially) so that the last digit of the sequence number functions as a check digit for the entire personal identification number. In this case, the number satisfies the equation 4x_{1} + 3x_{2} + 2x_{3} + 7x_{4} + 6x_{5} + 5x_{6} + 4x_{7} + 3x_{8} + 2x_{9} + x_{10} ≡ 0 (mod 11) where the x_{i} are the ten digits of the complete ID number, and the coefficients (4, 3, 2, 7, …) are all nonzero in the finite field of order 11.

However, in 2007 the available sequence numbers under this system for males born on 1 January 1965 ran out, and since October 2007 personal identification numbers do not always validate using the check digit. This had been predicted and announced several years in advance. Thus, most IT systems are presumed updated to accept numbers that fail the check-digit validation.

1 January was the first birth date to run out of sequence numbers. This was because for several years immigrants who did not know their exact date of birth were administratively registered with the fictitious birth date of 1 January. This made the date unusually frequent in the register. That practice stopped at a time before 2023.

== Personal ID Number Certificate ==
Personnummerbevis is the Danish term for the personal identification number certificate. Today this certificate is of little use in Danish society, as it has been largely replaced by the much more versatile Sundhedskort ("Health Card"), which contains the same information and more. Both certificates retrieve their information from the Civil Registration System. However, personnummerbevis is still issued today and has been since September 1968.

It is received upon registration with the Civil Registration System, either by birth or by moving to the country. It may only be issued once and change of address does not entail issuing a new one. One can however request a new one from the Ministry of Welfare or in some cases the municipality one lives in.
