= Gasolin' (1971 album) =

1971 album by Gasolin'

Studio album by Gasolin'
- Released: 21 November 1971
- Recorded: July–September 1971 at Rosenberg Studio, Copenhagen
- Genre: Rock
- Length: 39:56
- Language: Danish
- Label: CBS
- Producer: Gasolin'; Sture Lindén (exec.); Poul Bruun (exec.)

Gasolin' chronology
Gasolin' (1971)	Gasolin' 2 (1972)

Singles from Gasolin'
- 1. "Langebro" / "Lilli-Lilli" Released: Early 1972

Professional ratings
Review scores
Source	Rating
Christgau's Record Guide	A−

Gasolin' (also called Gas 1) is the debut studio album by Danish rock band Gasolin'. It was released in November 1971 by CBS Records. Instead of boogie rock and catchy tunes, they relied on creating songs with a moody feel such as "Langebro", "Fra dag til dag" and "Tremastet beton". The latter is recited by the poet Mogens Mogensen. Lead singer Kim Larsen later jokingly referred to the song as the first Danish rap. The lyrics and the music have a dark and mysterious ambience. From this album "Langebro" was released on the single with "Lilli-Lilli" on the b-side.

The album was produced by the band itself in Copenhagen and sound engineer, Freddy Hansson went to Trident Studios in London to mix it with Roy Thomas Baker. He would later become Gasolin's producer. The cover was an illustration made by Hergé (originally from The Seven Crystal Balls), who loved the fact that a rock band would use one of his drawings for an album cover.

The album was released on CD in 1987 with Gasolin' 2 (1972) but due to lack of space "Tremastet beton" was omitted. It was remastered for CD in 1991 and in 2003 it was included in The Black Box box set.

== Track listing ==
Side one
No.	Title	Writer(s)	Length
1.	"Langebro"	Trad. / Kim Larsen, Wili Jønsson, Franz Beckerlee	3:20
2.	"Hey Christoffer"	Larsen, Beckerlee	4:13
3.	"Fra dag til dag"	Jønsson, Beckerlee	4:26
4.	"Lille Henry"	Larsen	2:28
5.	"Tremastet beton"	Jønsson, Mogens Mogensen	5:29

Side two
No.	Title	Writer(s)	Length
1.	"Solfangen"	Jønsson, Beckerlee	3:14
2.	"Laphophora Williamsii"	Larsen, Beckerlee, Mogensen	3:23
3.	"Jeg kan høre dig kalde"	Larsen, Søren Berlev	3:15
4.	"Strengt fortroligt"	Larsen, Jønsson, Beckerlee	4:31
5.	"Lilli-Lilli"	Larsen, Jønsson	5:02

== Personnel ==
=== Gasolin' ===
- Wili Jønsson – bass guitar, piano, vocals
- Kim Larsen – vocals, guitar accompaniment
- Franz Beckerlee – lead guitar, alto saxophone, harmonica, vocals
- Søren Berlev – drums, vocals, acoustic guitar on "Jeg kan høre dig kalde"

=== Additional musicians ===
- Mogens Mogensen – vocals on "Tremastet beton"

=== Production ===
- Gasolin' – producer
- Sture Lindén – executive producer
- Poul Bruun – executive producer
- Freddy Hansson – engineer
- Roy Thomas Baker – mixing in Trident Studios, London
