= Gasolin' =

Danish rock band

- Gasolin' in the 1970s. From left to right: Franz Beckerlee, Wili Jønsson, Søren Berlev and Kim Larsen.

Background information
- Origin: Christianshavn, Copenhagen, Denmark
- Genres: Rock
- Years active: 1969–1978
- Labels: CBS, Sonet, Spectator
- Past members: Franz Beckerlee; Wili Jønsson; Kim Larsen (deceased); Bjørn Uglebjerg (deceased); Søren Berlev

Gasolin' were a Danish rock band from Christianshavn, Copenhagen, formed by Kim Larsen, Franz Beckerlee, and Wili Jønsson in 1969. Their first drummer was the late Bjørn Uglebjerg. He was replaced by Søren Berlev in 1971. At their formation, the guitar playing of Franz Beckerlee was inspired by Jimi Hendrix and the vocals and lyrics of Larsen were inspired by Bob Dylan, while the rhythm playing of Jønsson and Berlev owed much to The Beatles. However, they would soon develop their own musical style. The pop sensibility of Kim Larsen, the artistic attitude of Franz Beckerlee and the musical competence of Wili Jønsson would prove to be a recipe for success. Gasolin's lyrics were generally written by the entire group, often with the assistance of their friend Mogens Mogensen.

== History ==
Franz Beckerlee and Wili Jønsson had known each other since they were boys, and as both played music they wanted to form a band together. While Beckerlee had been brought up without much love by his grandmother and grandfather, he felt warmth in Wili's home. Kim Larsen joined them after reading an ad which was put up at Christiania. He soon became "one of the boys," but the band still lacked a drummer. After a while Bjørn Uglebjerg became their first drummer, but was later replaced by Søren Berlev. In 1970 Gasolin' released their first single "Silky Sally." It was followed by "Child of Institution" and "Johnny The Jackpot." These three singles were sung in English and flopped. Their debut album and all subsequent albums had Danish lyrics and were a success. Although they would occasionally still sing in English, Danish proved to be the language where they could express themselves most eloquently and this was acknowledged by the Danish audience and critics.

From 1972 to 1978, Gasolin' was the most popular rock band in Denmark. With producer Roy Thomas Baker, they released classics such as Gasolin' 3, Gas 5 and Efter endnu en dag. Some people consider Gasolin' to be the Danish Beatles, with each album a landmark and like The Beatles, the band broke up at the pinnacle of their success. The reasons for the split were the failure to break the international market and personal differences.

After the demise, Kim Larsen would go on to become a very successful solo artist. His album from 1983, Midt om Natten, is the best-selling album in Denmark ever. Wili Jønsson and Søren Berlev would go on playing music as session musicians and in various bands. Franz Beckerlee works as an artist, but occasionally he played with Søren Berlev in Christianhavns Bluesband and in 1979 he released No Kiddin.

In 1991, the CD compilation Rabalderstræde Forever became a hit as was the box set from 2003 The Black Box. In 2006, a movie called Gasolin' 4-ever directed by Anders Østergaard became the most popular documentary movie in Denmark ever. Despite this, Gasolin' have always refused to reunite (and, due to Larsen's death in 2018, it is even more unlikely that Gasolin' will reunite).

== Discography ==
=== Albums ===
- Gasolin' (1971) CBS
- Gasolin' 2 (1972) CBS
- Gasolin' 3 (1973) CBS
- Gasolin' (1974) CBS
- The Last Jim (1974) CBS
- Stakkels Jim (1974) CBS
- Gas 5 (1975) CBS
- Live sådan (1976 - live record) CBS
- What a Lemon (1976) Epic EPC (NL)
- Efter endnu en dag (1976) CBS
- Gør det noget (1977) CBS
- Killin' Time (1978) CBS
- Live i Skandinavien (1978 - live record) CBS
- Supermix 1 (1980 - compilation) CBS
- Supermix (1980 - compilation) CBS
- Rabalderstræde Forever (1991 - compilation) CBS
- Derudaf Forever (1993 - live record) COL
- A Foreign Affair (1997 - compilation) COL
- Gasolin' Forever (1999 - compilation) COL
- The Early Years (2000 - compilation) COL
- A Foreign Affair II (2002 - compilation) COL
- The Black Box (2003 - box set) COL
- Masser af succes (2009 - compilation)

All albums were released by CBS or Columbia Records.

=== Non-album singles ===
- "Silky Sally" / "I've Got to Find the Looser" (1970 - Spectator Records)
- "Child of Institution" / "The Escape" and "W.J." (1970 - Sonet)
- "Johnny the Jackpot" / "Get in Touch with Tomorrow" (1971 - CBS)
- "Holy Jean" / "Lady Rain" (1973 - CBS)
- "Fed lykke til alle" / "I Love You Baby and Truckdriver Blues" (1973 - CBS)
- "Hva' gør vi nu, lille du" / "Keep on Knockin' " (1976 - CBS)
- "Endelig jul igen" / "Get on the Train" (1977 - CBS)
- "Where Do We Go Now, Mon Ami" / "Killin' Time" (1978 - CBS)
- "Uh-Lu-La-Lu" / "Killin' Time" (1978 - CBS)
- "Bob-Shi-Bam (Live)" / "Girl You Got Me Lonely" (Live) (12" only/blue vinyl) (1978 - CBS)
- "Dejlig er jorden" / "Endelig jul igen" (1979 - CBS)
