= Gasolin' 3 =

Studio album by Gasolin'
- Released: November 1973
- Recorded: August 1973 at Rosenberg studio, Copenhagen
- Genre: Rock
- Length: 36:13
- Language: Danish
- Label: CBS
- Producer: Roy Thomas Baker

Gasolin' chronology
Gasolin' 2 (1972)	Gasolin' 3 (1973)	Stakkels Jim (1974)

Singles from Gasolin' 3
- 1. "Det var Inga, Katinka og Smukke Charlie på sin Harley" Released: 1973; 2. "Bessefar" Released: 1974

Gasolin' 3 was the third album from Danish rock band Gasolin', released in November 1973. It was the band's first album to be produced by Roy Thomas Baker. Gasolin' 3 was recorded in Rosenberg Studio in Copenhagen with Freddy Hansson as sound engineer.

The influence of Roy Thomas Baker is noticeable. The sound is more dynamic than on the two previous albums, especially the drum sound. Musically the songs are more heavy and hard-hitting and also more professional and commercial compared to the previous two albums. Furthermore, the Moog synthesizer was introduced by Franz Beckerlee in songs such as "Rabalder" and "Sju-bi-du-bi-mand". With this album Gasolin achieved superstar status in Denmark.

The tracks "Det var Inga, Katinka og Smukke Charlie på sin Harley" / "Jeg er splittergal" and "Bessefar" / "Smukke Linda" were released as singles. In 1974, Gasolin' 3 was released with English lyrics as Gasolin'.

Gasolin' 3 was released on CD in 1987 with Stakkels Jim and in 1991 it was remastered for CD. In 2003 it was included in The Black Box.

== Track listing ==
=== Side one ===
1. "Smukke Linda" (Gasolin', Mogens Mogensen) – 4:58
2. "Rabalder" (Kim Larsen, Wili Jönsson, Franz Beckerlee) – 2:28
3. "Katten" (Larsen, Jönsson, Beckerlee, Mogensen) – 2:50
4. "Jeg troede jeg var" (Larsen, Jönsson, Beckerlee, Mogensen) – 3:13
5. "Bobo's sang" (Larsen, Jönsson, Beckerlee, Mogensen) – 4:05

=== Side two ===
1. "Det var Inga, Katinka og Smukke Charlie på sin Harley" (Tommy Pedersen, Gasolin', Mogensen) – 2:51
2. "Jeg er splittergal" (Larsen, Jönsson, Beckerlee) – 3:15
3. "Cafe Paradis" (Gasolin', Mogensen) – 4:14
4. "Bessefar" (Larsen, Jönsson, Beckerlee, Mogensen) – 2:12
5. "Sju-bi-du-bi-mand" (Gasolin') – 5:54

== Personnel ==
=== Gasolin' ===
- Kim Larsen – vocals, rhythm guitar, lead guitar on "Det var Inga, Katinka..." and "Bobo's sang"
- Franz Beckerlee – lead guitar, Moog, vocals, bass on "Jeg er splittergal"
- Wili Jønsson – bass, piano, organ, vocals
- Søren Berlev – drums, percussion

=== Additional musicians ===
- Niels Harrit – tenor saxophone, baritone saxophone, percussion, piano on "Bessefar"

=== Production ===
- Roy Thomas Baker – producer
- Freddy Hansson – engineer

== Cover ==
The cover image is a painting by Tage Hansen which was used without his approval. When he learned about the usage he offered approval after the fact for the price of two copies of the album, which he did receive. In 2010 it was announced that the album cover image will be used for a postage stamp after a vote among listeners of Danish Broadcasting Corporation.
