= Gas 5 =

Album by Gasolin'

Studio album by Gasolin'
- Released: 14 October 1975
- Recorded: June 1975 at Rosenberg studio, Copenhagen
- Genre: Rock
- Length: 38:33
- Language: Danish, English
- Label: CBS
- Producer: Roy Thomas Baker

Gasolin' chronology
Stakkels Jim (1974)	Gas 5 (1975)	Live Sådan (1976)

Singles from Gas 5
- 1. "Rabalderstræde" Released: 1975, 1976 (Spain); 2. "Refrainet er Frit" Released: 1975, 1976 (Yugoslavia)

Gas 5 was Gasolin's fifth album in five years and was released in October 1975. From the humble beginnings of their debut album they had developed into a confident arena rock band with this release. In hindsight, Gas 5 may be considered to be their definitive album.

== Overview ==
Roy Thomas Baker provided a big powerful "Led Zeppelin rock sound", while Wolfgang Käfer provided the strings to the epic rock songs: "Rabalderstræde", "Fatherless Hill" and "Sct. Emitri". Wili Jönsson played the harpsichord on the latter song. The power pop of "Kvinde min" and the reflective ballad of "Masser af success" show a gentle side too.

Gas 5 was the first Gasolin album to include songs with English lyrics (if one does not include the albums that Gasolin released only for the international market). From this album "Rabalderstræde" / "Kvinde min" and "Refrain er frit" / "Good Time Charlie" were released as singles.

Gas 5 was recorded at Rosenberg Studio in Copenhagen with Freddy Hansson as sound engineer. For the first time in Denmark an album was recorded with a 24-track mix board. That board was also used for the album cover. Gas 5 was released on CD in 1987 with Efter endnu en dag (1976), but due to lack of space "Good Time Charlie" was omitted. It was remastered for CD in 1991 and is also included on The Black Box box set (2003).

Gas 5 was released with English lyrics as What a Lemon in the UK, and as Gasolin' in USA. It was also released in Spain in Danish with "Rabalderstræde" / "Sjagge" as single.

== Track list ==
1. "Rabalderstræde" (Larsen-Jönsson/Gasolin'-Mogensen) - 4:56
2. "Fatherless Hill" (Larsen-Gasolin'/Larsen) - 4:15
3. "Lonesome Avenue" (Larsen) - 3:25
4. "Sjagge" (Pedersen-Gasolin'/Gasolin'-Mogensen) - 3:07
5. "Masser af succes" (Larsen/Larsen-Mogensen) - 3:33
6. "Refrainet er frit" (Gasolin'/Gasoln'-Mogensen) - 4:13
7. "Kvinde min" (Larsen/Gasolin'-Mogensen) - 2.42
8. "1975" (Larsen/Gasolin'-Mogensen) - 3:32
9. "Sct. Emetri" (Larsen-Jönsson/Gasolin'-Mogensen) - 4:43
10. "Good Time Charlie" (Gasolin'/Gasolin'-Malone) - 3:59

Note: Mogens Mogensen and Skip Malone co-wrote lyrics with Gasolin'

== Credits ==
=== Gasolin' ===
- Franz Beckerlee - guitar, moog
- Kim Larsen - vocals, rhythm guitar
- Søren Berlev - drums, percussion
- Wili Jønsson - bass, keyboards, vocals

with

- Anne Linnet and Lis Sørensen: backup vocals on "Lonesome Avenue", "Kvinde Min" and "Good Time Charlie"
- Produced by Roy Thomas Baker
- Engineered by Freddy Hansson
- Recorded in Rosenberg Studio during June 1975
