= Herbert Schildt =

American computer scientist

- Born: February 28, 1951 (age 75)
- Education: University of Illinois at Urbana–Champaign
- Years active: 1969-1978 (music)
- Website: herbschildt.com

Herbert Schildt (born February 28, 1951) is an American computing author, programmer and musician. He has written books about various programming languages. He was also a founding member of the progressive rock band Starcastle.

== Life ==
Schildt holds both graduate and undergraduate degrees from the University of Illinois at Urbana-Champaign (UIUC). He claims he was a member of the original ANSI committee that standardized the C language in 1989, and the ANSI/ISO committees that updated that standard in 1999, and standardized C++ in 1998. Other members of the ANSI C committee have drawn his presence on the committee and the quality of his committee efforts into question.

Schildt has written books about the MS-DOS operating system and C, C++, C#, and other programming languages. His earliest books were published around 1985 and 1986. (The book Advanced Modula-2 from 1987 says on the cover that it is his sixth book.) His books were initially published by Osborne, an early computer book publisher which concentrated on titles for the personal computer. After the acquisition of Osborne by McGraw-Hill, the imprint continued publishing Schildt's work until the imprint was subsumed completely into the larger company.

== Little C ==
One of Schildt's most enduring projects is the Little C interpreter, which is a lengthy example of a hand-written recursive-descent parser which interprets a subset of the C language. The program was originally published in Dr. Dobb's Journal in August, 1989 entitled "Building your own C interpreter". This example was included in the books Born to Code In C (Osborne, 1989), The Craft of C (Osborne, 1992), and in a later edition of C: The Complete Reference.

Schildt's book The Art of C++ similarly features an interpreter for a language called Mini-C++. (Mini-C++ does not support the "class" keyword, although minimal and artificial support for cin and cout has been added.) There is also a BASIC interpreter called Small BASIC in Turbo C: The Complete Reference, first edition, written in C, and another in The Art of Java (2003) written in Java.

Code for all these is available for download from the McGraw Hill technical books website, under each book.

== Starcastle ==
In addition to his work as a computer scientist, Schildt is the original multi-keyboardist for the progressive rock band Starcastle, appearing on all of the group's albums, most of which were produced from 1976 to 1978. His style is distinguished by extensive use of Oberheim analog sequencers to create ethereal washes of sound colors, a pioneering technique which was quite cutting-edge for the pre-digital synthesizer period. He is also featured on the band's 2007 album Song of Times.

== Reception ==
Schildt is called "one of the world's foremost authors of books about programming" by International Developer magazine. He is featured as one of the rock star programmers in Ed Burns' book Secrets of the Rock Star Programmers. His books have sold in the millions, worldwide.

Schildt's books have a reputation for being riddled with errors. Their technical accuracy has been challenged by many reviewers, including ISO C committee members Peter Seebach and Clive Feather, C FAQ author Steve Summit, and numerous C Vu reviewers from the Association of C and C++ Users (ACCU).

Other reviewers have been more positive, with one ACCU reviewer saying about Schildt's C: The Complete Reference, Fourth Edition that Schildt "has learnt something, not enough to receive positive acclaim but enough to remove the 'positively detrimental' epithet".

== Bibliography (of selected books) ==
- Modula-2 Made Easy (ISBN 0-07-881241-0, Osborne, 1986)
- Advanced Turbo Pascal (ISBN 0-07-881283-6, Osborne, 1987)
- Advanced Modula-2 (ISBN 0-07-881245-3, Osborne, 1987)
- Advanced Turbo Prolog 1.1 (ISBN 0-07-881285-2, Osborne, 1987)
- Advanced Turbo C, foreword by Phillipe Kahn (ISBN 0-07-8814790, Osborne, 1987)
- Artificial Intelligence in C (ISBN 0-07-881255-0, Osborne, 1987)
- C: The Complete Reference (ISBN 0-07-881313-1 Osborne, 1987)
- Advanced C (ISBN 0-07-881348-4, Osborne, 1988)
- Turbo C: The Complete Reference (ISBN 0-07-881346-8, Osborne, 1988)
- Advanced Turbo C (ISBN 0-07-881479-0, Osborne, 1989)
- Born to Code In C (ISBN 0-07-881468-5, Osborne, 1989)
- The Annotated ANSI C Standard (ISBN 0-07-881952-0, Osborne, 1990)
- Teach Yourself DOS (ISBN 0-07-881630-0, Osborne, 1990)
- Teach Yourself C (ISBN 0-07-881596-7, Osborne, 1990)
- C++: The Complete Reference (ISBN 0-07-8816548, Osborne, 1991)
- Teach Yourself C++ (ISBN 0-07-881760-9, Osborne, 1992)
- Java: The Complete Reference, with Patrick Naughton (ISBN 0-07-882231-9, Osborne, 1996)
- Java 2 Programmer's Reference, with Joe O'Neil (ISBN 0-07-212354-0, Osborne/McGraw Hill, 2000)
- C#: A Beginner's Guide (ISBN 0-07-213329-5, Osborne/McGraw Hill, 2001)
- C#: The Complete Reference (ISBN 0-07-213485-2, Osborne/McGraw Hill, 2002)
- C++: A Beginner's Guide (ISBN 0-07-219467-7, Osborne/McGraw Hill, 2002)
- Java: A Beginner's Guide (ISBN 0-07-222588-2, Osborne/McGraw Hill, 2002)
- The Art of C++ (ISBN 0-07-225512-9, Osborne/McGraw Hill, 2004)
- Herb Schildt's Java Programming Cookbook (ISBN 0-07-226315-6, Osborne/McGraw Hill, 2007)
- Herb Schildt's C++ Programming Cookbook (ISBN 0-07-148860-X, Osborne/McGraw Hill, 2008)
- C# 3.0: A Beginner's Guide (ISBN 0-07-158830-2, Osborne/McGraw Hill, 2009)
- C# 3.0: The Complete Reference (ISBN 978-0-07-158841-6, Osborne/McGraw Hill, 2009)
- C# 4.0: The Complete Reference (ISBN 0-07-174117-8, Osborne/McGraw Hill, 2010)
- C++ from the GROUND UP (ISBN 0-07-222897-0, Osborne/McGraw Hill, 2003)
