= Stakkels Jim =

Studio album by Gasolin'
- Released: November 1974
- Recorded: Autumn 1974 at Rosenberg studio, Copenhagen
- Genre: Rock
- Length: 39:24
- Language: Danish
- Label: CBS
- Producer: Roy Thomas Baker

Gasolin' chronology
Gasolin' 3 (1973)	Stakkels Jim (1974)	Gas 5 (1975)

Singles from Stakkels Jim
- 1. "Onkel 'How Do You Do'" Released: 1974; 2. "Bingo" Released: 1974

Stakkels Jim (a.k.a. Gas 4) is a studio album by Gasolin' and was released in November 1974. It was the second album to be produced by Roy Thomas Baker.

The raw rock of Gasolin' 3 would on this record be replaced by a more polished and bombastic sound, and for the first time strings would be incorporated. Stakkels Jim does not rock as hard as Gasolin' 3 and songs such as "Bingo" and "Perron 'Gare du Nord' " are quite poppish. However, epic rock songs such as "Legenden om Josha og Ming" and the title song, which was based on the "Auld lang syne" melody, would be the blueprint for their next album, Gas 5.

Stakkels Jim (translation: Poor Jim) was recorded in Rosenberg Studio in Copenhagen with Freddy Hansson as sound engineer. From this album "Onkel 'How Do You Do' " / "Johnny Lee" and "Bingo" / "Alla-Tin-Gala" were released as singles. Stakkels Jim was also released in England with English lyrics as The Last Jim in November 1974.

Stakkels Jim was released on cd in 1987 with Gasolin' 3, but due to lack of space "Legenden om Josha og Ming" and "Johnny Lee" were omitted. In 1991 it was remastered for cd and it is also included in The Black Box (2003).

The album was listed on Billboard's Hits of the World on 11 January 1975.

== Track listing ==
1. "Alla-Tin-Gala" (Larsen-Gasolin'-Mogensen) - 3:24
2. "Daddy-Ding-Dong" (Gasolin') - 3:14
3. "Bingo (Larsen-Gasolin'-Mogensen)" - 3:03
4. "Onkel 'How Do You Do' " (Jönsson-Beckerlee-Gasolin'-Mogensen) - 3:27
5. "Legenden om Josha og Ming" (Gasolin') - 5:40
6. "Kap Farvel til Ümánarssuaq" (Gasolin') - 3:38
7. "Perron 'Gare du Nord' "(Larsen-Gasolin'-Mogensen) - 2:46
8. "Damernes nar" (Larsen-Gasolin'-Mogensen) - 3:14
9. "Johnny Lee" (Gasolin') - 3:24
10. "Stakkels Jim" (trad.arr.-Gasolin'-Mogensen) - 4:12
11. "The Last Jim" (Larsen-Beckerlee) - 2:52

Note: Mogens Mogensen co-wrote the lyrics with Gasolin'.

== Personnel ==
=== Gasolin' ===
- Kim Larsen – vocals, guitar plus some bass and moog
- Franz Beckerlee – lead guitar, moog, backup vocals
- Wili Jønsson – bass, piano, backup vocals
- Søren Berlev – drums, percussion, backup vocals

=== Production ===
- Produced by Roy Thomas Baker
- Engineered by Freddy Hansson
- Recorded and mixed during the fall of 1974 in Rosenberg Studio
