= Roy Thomas Baker =

English record producer (1946–2025)

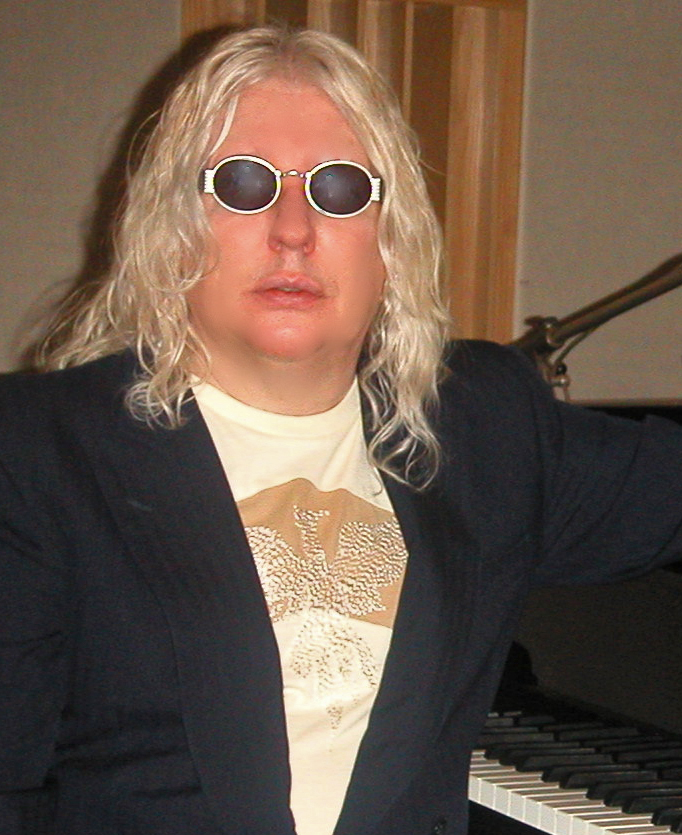
- Baker at the piano in Whitfield Street Studios in London, January 2002

Background information
- Also known as: RTB
- Born: 10 November 1946; Hampstead, London, England
- Died: 12 April 2025 (aged 78) Lake Havasu City, Arizona, US
- Genres: Rock; pop; alternative rock; new wave; power pop; hard rock; glam rock; glam metal
- Occupations: Record producer; songwriter; arranger
- Years active: 1970–2014
- Labels: Decca; Trident; Hollywood; EMI Records; Parlophone; Elektra; RTB; Warner Bros.
- Website: RoyThomasBaker.com

Roy Thomas Baker (10 November 1946 – 12 April 2025) was an English record producer, songwriter and arranger who produced rock and pop songs, best known for producing five out of the first seven albums by British rock band Queen and the first four albums by American rock band the Cars.

== Life and career ==
Baker was born in Hampstead, London, on 10 November 1946. He began his career at Decca Records at 14 and later worked as an assistant engineer at Morgan Studios in London. Encouraged by music producer Gus Dudgeon, he soon moved to Trident Studios in Soho where he worked with Dudgeon, Tony Visconti, Mick Jagger, and Keith Richards in addition to Frank Zappa. He recorded artists including the Rolling Stones, David Bowie, the Who, Gasolin', Nazareth, Santana, the Mothers of Invention, Jet, Be-Bop Deluxe, Free, Journey, and T. Rex.

After co-founding Neptune (Trident's record company), Baker met the rock band Queen. Thus began a relationship lasting for five albums (Queen, Queen II, Sheer Heart Attack, A Night at the Opera, and Jazz)and a number of awards including 21 Grammy Awards and several Guinness World Records for the hit song, "Bohemian Rhapsody".

After his success with Queen and other artists, Baker signed a multi-album production deal with CBS Music (Columbia Records, Sony Music, Epic Records, etc.). He proceeded to move to the U.S. and set up RTB Audio Visual Productions in New York City and Los Angeles. With the CBS deal, RTB produced Journey, Starcastle, Reggie Knighton of the Grass Roots), Ian Hunter, and Ronnie Wood (the Rolling Stones). Also at the time, he committed to produce four albums for the Cars after being prompted by Elektra Records to see them perform in a Boston school gymnasium. The albums were certified platinum and the Cars were nominated for a Grammy.

He was offered the post of senior vice president of A&R for Elektra as executive and/or producer with recording artists Lindsey Buckingham, Mötley Crüe, Joe Lynn Turner, Josie Cotton and Dokken as well as continuing with Queen and the Cars. During his tenure, Elektra signed artists Metallica, Simply Red, Yello, Peter Schilling, the World, and 10,000 Maniacs.

Baker also worked with Guns N' Roses, Alice Cooper, Foreigner, Pilot, Ozzy Osbourne, Devo, The Stranglers, Dusty Springfield, T'Pau, Local H, Cheap Trick, and Lewis Furey. In 2005, he produced One Way Ticket to Hell... and Back by the Darkness; the Smashing Pumpkins' 2007 album, Zeitgeist; the Storm's 2008 album When the Storm Meets the Ground, the Smashing Pumpkins' American Gothic and One Karma's 2011 album Life Got in the Way. Baker produced Yes's 2014 album Heaven & Earth (his final production work), 35 years after previously working with the band on sessions in Paris which did not lead to an album. Baker produced Christopher Moons 's Album titled THE WORLD IS YOUR$ early 2025 , January he is featured as an additional artist in the album and producer.

Baker died in Lake Havasu City, Arizona, on 12 April 2025, at the age of 78.

== Discography ==
- Arnold Corns: "Man in the Middle" (1971 – released 1985)
- Free: Fire and Water (1970)
- Black Widow: Sacrifice (engineer) (1970)
- Nazareth: Nazareth (engineer) (1971)
- Nazareth: Exercises (1972)
- Gasolin': Gasolin' 3 (1973)
- Gasolin': Stakkels Jim (in English: "Poor Jim") (1974)
- Queen: Queen (1973) (Credited as Roy Baker)
- Queen: Queen II (1974)
- Hawkwind: Hall of the Mountain Grill (1974)
- Robert Calvert: Captain Lockheed and the Starfighters (1974)
- Man: Rhinos, Winos and Lunatics (1974)
- The Trammps: The Legendary Zing Album (1975)
- Queen: Sheer Heart Attack (1974)
- Queen: A Night at the Opera (1975)
- Jet: Jet (1975)
- Be-Bop Deluxe: Futurama (1975)
- Gasolin': Gas 5 (1975)
- Lewis Furey: The Humours Of (1976)
- Pilot: Morin Heights (1976)
- Gasolin': Efter endnu en dag (1976)
- Ian Hunter: Overnight Angels (1977)
- Starcastle: Fountains of Light (1977)
- Starcastle: Citadel (1977)
- Dusty Springfield: It Begins Again (1978)
- The Cars: The Cars (1978)
- Queen: Jazz (1978)
- Journey: Infinity (1978)
- Journey: Evolution (1979)
- Yes: Paris Sessions aka Golden Age Sessions (1979; unreleased)
- Ron Wood: Gimme Some Neck (1979)
- The Cars: Candy-O (1979)
- Foreigner: Head Games (1979)
- Alice Cooper: Flush the Fashion (1980)
- The Cars: Panorama (1980)
- The Cars: Shake It Up (1981)
- Heavy Metal (Music From The Motion Picture) (1982)
- Cheap Trick: One on One (1982)
- Devo: Oh, No! It's Devo (1982)
- Fast Times at Ridgemont High: Music from the Motion Picture (1982)
- Mötley Crüe: Too Fast for Love (1982)
- Espionage: Espionage (1983)
- Dokken: Tooth and Nail (1984)
- Joe Lynn Turner: Rescue You (1985)
- Jon Anderson: 3 Ships (1985)
- American Anthem (Original Motion Picture Soundtrack) (1986)
- T'Pau: Bridge of Spies (titled T'Pau in the US) (1987)
- Slade: You Boyz Make Big Noize (1987)
- Ozzy Osbourne: No Rest for the Wicked (1988)
- The Stranglers: 10 (1989)
- East of Eden: East of Eden (1989)
- Chris de Burgh: Spark to a Flame (1990)
- Shy: Misspent Youth (1990)
- Dangerous Toys: Hellacious Acres (1991)
- The Stranglers: All Twelve Inches (1992)
- Wayne's World: Music from the Motion Picture (1992)
- Local H: Pack Up the Cats (1998)
- Caroline's Spine: Attention Please (1999)
- Other Star People: Diamonds In The Belly Of The Dog (1999)
- The Darkness: One Way Ticket to Hell... and Back (2005)
- The Smashing Pumpkins: Zeitgeist (2007)
- The Storm: Where The Storm Meets The Ground (2008)
- The Smashing Pumpkins: American Gothic (2008)
- Guns N' Roses: Chinese Democracy (2008) - additional production and preproduction
- Jimmy Chamberlin's This: Great Civilization (2010)
- Maximilian Is King. featuring Arthur Lynn and Nick Fowler: Songs To Kill Yourself With (2012)
- Yes: Heaven & Earth (2014)

• Christopher Moons THE WORLD IS YOUR$

• Christopher Moons: THE WORLD IS YOUR$ ALBUM

== See also ==
- Category:Albums produced by Roy Thomas Baker
- Category:Song recordings produced by Roy Thomas Baker
