= Kim Larsen =

Danish singer-songwriter and guitarist

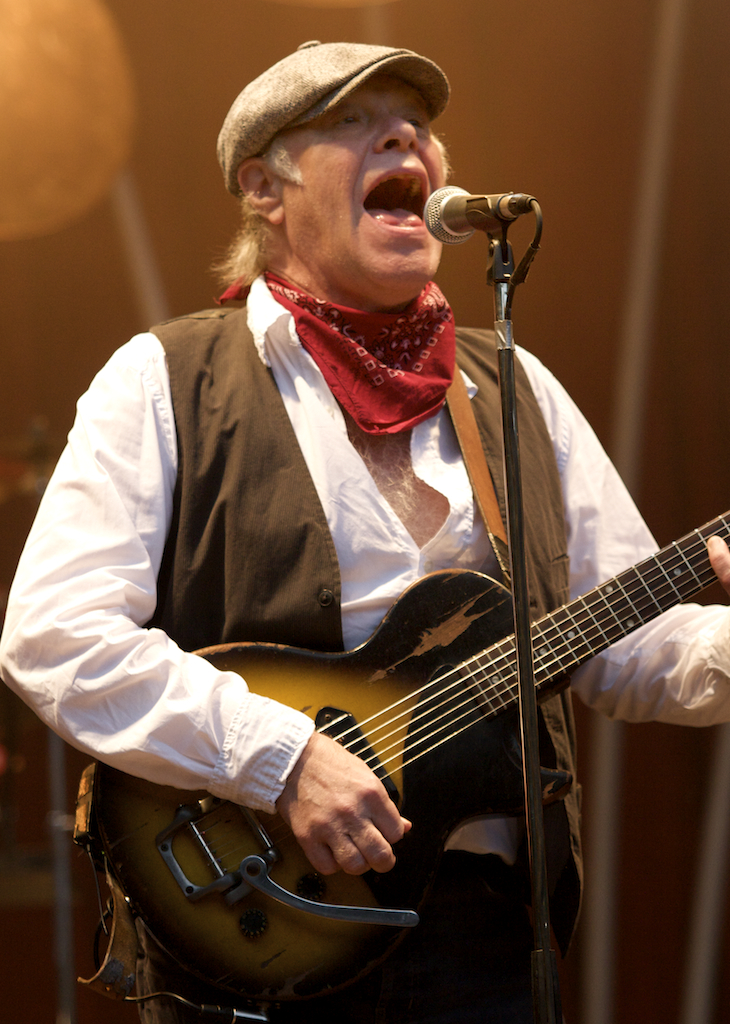
- Kim Larsen at the Nibe Festival in July 2009.

Background information
- Born: Kim Mellius Flyvholm Larsen; 23 October 1945; Copenhagen, Denmark
- Died: 30 September 2018 (aged 72) Odense, Denmark
- Genres: Rock, pop
- Occupation: Singer/songwriter
- Instruments: Vocals; guitar
- Years active: 1968-2018

Kim Mellius Flyvholm Larsen (23 October 1945 – 30 September 2018) was a Danish singer, songwriter, author, and guitarist. He began his musical career in 1968 after a brief period as an elementary school teacher and became known from 1969 as a member of the rock group Gasolin. During his time with Gasolin (which lasted until 1978), Larsen also released solo albums and records with his leisure band, which went by several names. After the disbandment of Gasolin, Larsen continued as a solo artist and band leader.

== Career ==
Kim Larsen was born in Copenhagen. Inspired by The Beatles and rock and roll, he began as a songwriter and guitarist. In 1969 he met Franz Beckerlee and Wili Jønsson, and the three founded Gasolin' which, later joined by drummer Søren Berlev, became one of the most successful Danish rock bands. The band dissolved in the late 1970s.

In 1979, Larsen participated in the Danish stage of the Eurovision Song Contest with the song "Ud i det blå" (lit.: Out into the blue). He came third out of 17 participants. The song was included on this album 231045-0637.

Around 1980, Larsen moved to New York. He released two albums but was not successful in breaking through in America and returned to Denmark after a few years.

Kim Larsen released a number of solo albums in the 1980s, topping the charts in 1983 with the album Midt om natten (en: In the Middle of the Night). The album more or less became a soundtrack for the movie by the same name based upon it.

In 1983, Larsen founded the band Kim Larsen & Bellami and released four albums until 1992, when after a couple of different line-ups, the band broke up. He then released another solo album, Hvem kan sige nej til en engel (Who Can Say No to an Angel). In the mid-1990s he founded the band Kim Larsen & Kjukken which was based in Odense.

He wrote a tribute song about MS Jutlandia's contributions as a hospital ship of Danish Red Cross during the Korean War. The song titled "Jutlandia" became a large hit in Denmark in 1986.

By the end of 2017, Larsen was diagnosed with prostate cancer. This would end up impacting his tour with Kim Larsen & Kjukken who were scheduled for concerts throughout January, February and March 2018. In a Facebook post published to the band's official profile page, Larsen apologised for the inconvenience and explained that he intended to be back playing by the start of the summer.

Larsen died of prostate cancer at his home in Odense on 30 September 2018. A week after his death a large memorial concert was held in Copenhagen with around 35,000 people attending, and major Danish musicians such as Magtens Korridorer, Love Shop, The Minds of 99, and Tim Christensen performing cover versions of Larsen's songs.

== Protest singer ==
Larsen frequently voiced his opposition to established society and instead advocated the right to be different from the mainstream. The album and movie Midt om natten revolves around this subject – in fact you can compare the movie action to the real Danish BZ movement BZ, Sorte Hest and also Freetown Christiania, located in Copenhagen. The same opposition is also shown by the album 231045-0637 – the title is Kim Larsen's personal identification number which is strictly personal. Larsen was against the big database of every citizen, implied by this title.

Kim Larsen was a heavy smoker, and he was critical of Danish anti-smoking laws. In August 2008, he paid for an advertising campaign which showed the text "Tillykke med rygeforbudet – Gesundheit macht frei !!!". The first sentence means "Congratulations on the smoking ban" in Danish, and the second sentence means "health makes (you) free" in German, a reference to the Nazi phrase Arbeit macht frei. Claiming that smoking bans are made not to protect smokers, but non-smokers, Kim Larsen made a connection between smoking bans and Nazism.

The biography Mine unge år – Kim Larsen (lit.: My young years – Kim Larsen) by writer & journalist Jens Andersen together with Kim Larsen, was incomplete before his death and the book was finished without Kim Larsen.

== Bands ==
=== Gasolin' (1969–1978) ===
- Kim Larsen – vocals, rhythm guitar
- Franz Beckerlee – lead guitar
- Wili Jønsson – bass
- Bjørn Uglebjerg (1969–1971) and Søren Berlev (1971–1978) – drums
- Klaus Agerschou (live concerts) – keyboards

=== Kim Larsen & Jungledreams (1978–1983) ===
- Kim Larsen – vocals, guitar
- Rick Blakemore – guitar
- Joe Delia – keyboards
- Abe Speller – drums
- Dennis Espantman – bass

=== Kim Larsen & Bellami (1983–1992) ===
1983–1984:

- Kim Larsen – vocals, guitar
- Henning Pold – bass
- Phil Barrett – keyboards, guitar
- Soren Wolff – guitar
- Jan Lysdahl – drums

1986–1992:

- Kim Larsen – vocals, guitar
- Henning Pold – bass
- Hans Fagt and Jan Lysdahl – drums
- Mikkel Håkonsson and Peter Ingemann – keyboards
- Thomas Grue and Per Rasmussen – guitars

=== Kim Larsen & Bell*Star (1992–1995) ===
- Kim Larsen – vocals, guitar
- Hans Fagt – drums
- Henning Pold – bass
- Mikkel Håkonsson – keyboards

=== Kim Larsen & Kjukken (1995–2018) ===
- Kim Larsen – vocals, guitar
- Bo Gryholt – bass (1995–2002) and Jesper Haugaard – bass (2002–2018)
- Karsten Skovgaard – guitar
- Jesper Rosenqvist – drums (1994–2014) and Jens Langhorn (2015–2018)
- Jørn Jeppesen – guitar (2015–2018)

== Discography ==
=== Solo albums ===
Studio

- 1973: Værsgo (lit. 'Here you are' (as in serving something))
- 1977: Kim Larsen & Yankee Drengene (en: Kim Larsen and the Yankee boys)
- 1979: 231045-0637 (Kim Larsen's personal identification number)
- 1981: Jungle Dreams
- 1983: Midt om natten (en: In the middle of the night)
- 1994: Hvem kan sige nej til en engel (en: Who can say no to an angel?)
- 2010: Mine damer og herrer (en: Ladies and gentlemen)
- 2019: Sange fra første sal

EP's

- 1982: 5 Eiffel

Compilations

- 1975: Skru Op
- 1977: Boller Op, Boller Ned
- 1979: Hittegods
- 1983: Gorilla Mix
- 1983: Larsens Bedste
- 1984: Årets Koncent
- 2015: Kim i 70'erne (with Gasolin')

Live

- 1985: Kim i Cirkus (Live) (en: Kim at the Circus)
- 2007: En lille pose støj (Live)

=== With Gasolin' ===
Studio

- 1971: Gasolin'
- 1972: Gasolin' 2
- 1973: Gasolin' 3
- 1974: Stakkels Jim (en: Poor Jim)
- 1975: Gas 5
- 1976: Efter endnu en dag (en: After Another Day)
- 1977: Gør det noget (en: Does it matter?)
- 1978: Killin' Time

Compilations

- 1980: Super Mix 1
- 1981: A Box Full of Gas
- 1984: Det Bedste Fra Mig Og Mine Venner (Kim Larsen with Gasolin')
- 1991: Rabalderstræde Forever
- 1993: Derudaf Forever
- 1997: A Foreign Affair vol.1
- 1999: Gasolin' Forever
- 2000: The Early Years
- 2002: A Foreign Affair vol.2
- 2003: The Black Box
- 2009: Masser af succes
- 2015: Kim I 70'erne

Live

- 1976: Live sådan (Live)
- 1978: Gøglernes aften (Live)

=== With Starfuckers ===
Live

- 1978: Vogt Dem for efterligninger (en: Beware of imitations)

=== With Kim Larsen & Jungledreams ===
Studio

- 1982: Sitting on a Time Bomb

=== With Kim Larsen & Bellami ===
Studio

- 1986: Forklædt som voksen (en: Disguised as an adult)
- 1988: Yummi yummi
- 1989: Kielgasten
- 1992: Wisdom Is Sexy

=== With Kim Larsen & Kjukken ===
Studio

- 1996: Kim Larsen & Kjukken
- 1998: Luft under vingerne (en: Air below the wings)
- 2001: Weekend Music
- 2001: Sange fra glemmebogen (en: Forgotten songs)
- 2003: 7-9-13
- 2004: Sange fra glemmebogen – Jul & nytår (en: Forgotten songs – Christmas and New Year)
- 2006: Gammel hankat (en: Old Tomcat)
- 2008: Glemmebogen for børn (en: Forgotten songs for children)
- 2012: Du glade verden (en: Happy world)
- 2017: Øst for Vesterled (en: East of Westway)

Live

- 2002: Det var en torsdag aften (en: It was a Thursday evening)
- 2007: En lille pose støj (en: A small bag of noise)

== Charting albums ==
(All peak positions in Danish Albums Chart)

- 2001: Weekend Music (reached No. 3)
- 2001: Sange fra glemmebogen (reached No. 1)
- 2006: Gammel hankat (reached No. 1)
- 2008: Glemmebogen for børn (reached No. 1)
- 2010: Mine damer og herrer (reached No. 1)
- 2012: 5 Eiffel (reached No. 21)
- 2015: Guld & grønne skove (reached No. 12)
- 2015: Forklædt som voksen (reached No. 14)

As Kim Larsen & Kjukken

- 2002: Det var en torsdag aften (reached No. 2)
- 2003: 7-9-13 (reached No. 1)
- 2004: Glemmebogen Jul & Nytår (reached No. 1)
- 2007: En lille pose støj (reached No. 1) (Live)

As Kim Larsen & Bellami

- 2015: Kielgasten (reached No. 22)

With Gasolin'

- 2015: Kim I 70'erne (reached No. 8)
