= Constantine Maroulis =

American singer

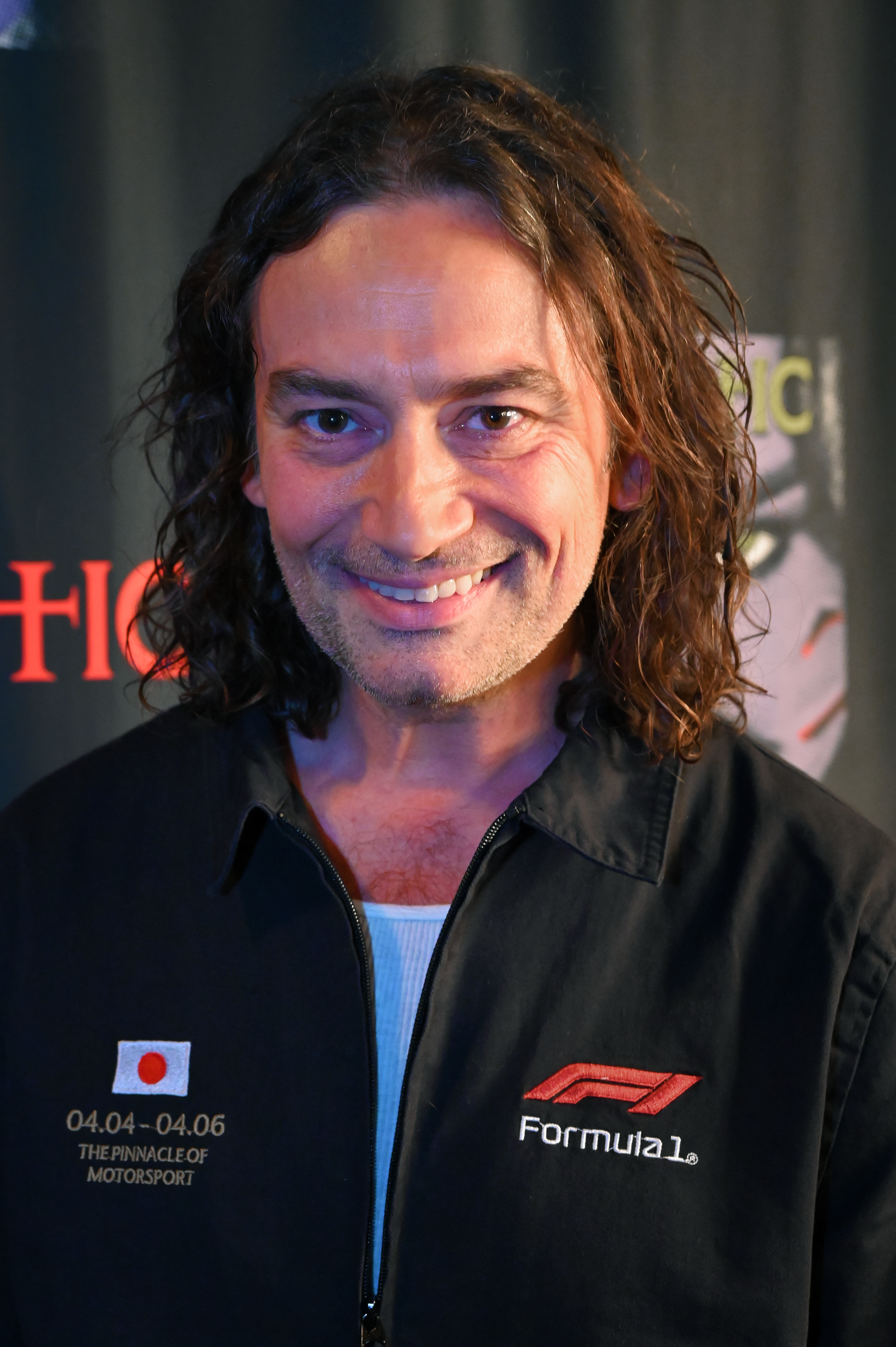
- Maroulis in 2025

Background information
- Born: Constantine James Maroulis; September 17, 1975 (age 51); Brooklyn, New York, U.S.
- Genre: Rock
- Occupations: Musician, actor
- Years active: 2003–present
- Formerly of: Adler's Appetite; Pray for the Soul of Betty
- Website: www.constantinemaroulis.com

Constantine James Maroulis (/məˈruːlɪs/; born September 17, 1975) is an American actor and rock singer. He was the sixth-place finalist on the fourth season of the reality television series American Idol, and received a nomination for the Tony Award for Best Performance by a Leading Actor in a Musical for his role in Rock of Ages. He starred in the title role in Jekyll and Hyde on Broadway, for which he received a Drama League Award Nomination for a Distinguished Performance Award.

== Early years ==
Maroulis was born in Brooklyn, New York to Greek American parents, James Constantine and Constance P. Maroulis (born 1938). Both his maternal and his paternal grandparents emigrated to the United States from Greece in the 1920s. He was brought up in the Greek Orthodoxy and he can speak Greek. His older brother, Athan Maroulis (born 1964), is a record producer and his sister, Anastacia P. Maroulis (born 1968), is a school principal.

When Maroulis was five years old his family moved to Wyckoff, New Jersey, a suburb in Bergen County, NJ, where he grew up. At that time he developed an interest in music, following the lead of his older brother. By age eleven he was studying the trumpet at Eisenhower Middle School.

He later sang in high school garage bands, including Lady Rain and Milkbone. Maroulis graduated from Ramapo High School in 1993. He and received a B.F.A. in Music Theater from Boston Conservatory. He was in the cast recording of the 2000 musical, Suburban Dreams, which was produced by composer Stephen Thompson, Richard Kenner, and Jesse Merz. Some years before appearing on American Idol, Maroulis competed on the dating show Elimidate and was an extra in Law & Order: Special Victims Unit and a voice-over artist on the Astro Boy.

He appeared in a number of off-Broadway roles from the Conservatory, along with a series of independent films. After graduating from the Conservatory, Maroulis trained as an acting apprentice at the prestigious Williamstown Theatre Festival in the Berkshires of Western Massachusetts and performed as Roger Davis in the Broadway international touring company of Rent. His role as Roger was non-equity. Since he had no agent representing him at that time, he was allowed to appear on American Idol.

== American Idol ==
In August 2004, acting upon his then-girlfriend's suggestion, Maroulis traveled to Washington DC to audition for fourth season of American Idol. For the 2005 season, Idol producers changed the age range of contestants from 16–24 to 16–28. Along with Bo Bice, Maroulis was one of the first contestants to benefit from this change. Maroulis and Bice are also notable for being among the first contestants to compete using the rock idiom.

On April 27, 2005, Maroulis was eliminated from American Idol after he performed Nickelback's "How You Remind Me" during the 2000s music round. Less than a week before his elimination, Maroulis's pre-Idol band, Pray for the Soul of Betty, announced the 10 May release of their self-titled debut on their label, Baby Julius. Maroulis was featured on the American Idol Season 4: The Showstoppers compilation with "My Funny Valentine". His rendition of the Queen classic "Bohemian Rhapsody" earned him the praise of judges. At the personal invitation of Queen's guitarist Brian May, Maroulis later recorded a studio version of the track for Killer Queen: A Tribute to Queen, which was released on August 9, 2005 on Queen's label, Hollywood Records.

=== List of American Idol performances ===
Week #	Song Choice	Original Artist	Result
Top 24	"Kiss from a Rose"	Seal	Safe
Top 20	"Hard to Handle"	Otis Redding	Safe
Top 16	"Every Little Thing She Does Is Magic"	The Police	Safe
Top 12	"You've Made Me So Very Happy"	Blood, Sweat & Tears	Safe
Top 11	"I Think I Love You"	The Partridge Family	Safe
Top 10	"I Can't Make You Love Me"	Bonnie Raitt	Safe
Top 9	"My Funny Valentine"	Richard Rodgers/Lorenz Hart	Safe
Top 8	"Bohemian Rhapsody"	Queen	Safe
Top 7	"Nights on Broadway"	The Bee Gees	Safe
Top 6	"How You Remind Me"	Nickelback	Eliminated

== Betty frontman ==
Maroulis became the lead vocalist of Pray for the Soul of Betty in 2003, after winning over 150 auditioners. The band rose to national attention when Maroulis appeared on Idol. His audition clip showed him "quitting" the band amongst the displeasure of one of his bandmates, which they have claimed is an inaccurate portrayal. On March 20, 2006, after three years with the band, Maroulis announced his departure due to creative and business differences.

== Solo career ==
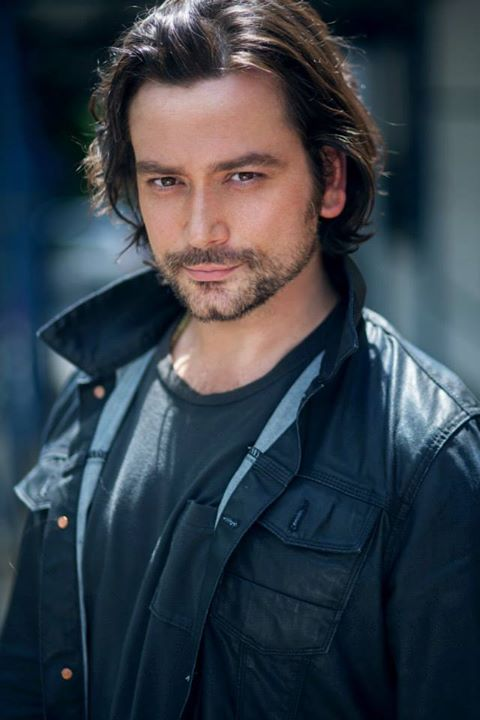
Constantine Maroulis in May 2015.

In November and December 2005, Maroulis performed solo shows in Manila, Philippines and New Jersey, USA. His set list included songs he had performed previously in his theatre roles, from Hedwig and the Angry Inch Rent, and Jesus Christ Superstar, as well as from his stint on American Idol. In August 2006, Constantine completed a solo tour of 13 cities, where he debuted material to be featured on his upcoming CD, including various self-penned compositions.

Maroulis created his own independent label, Sixth place Records, a branch of Sixth place Productions, which released his 2-years-in-the-making solo album, Constantine on August 7, 2007. Maroulis' self-titled CD consisted of 12 tracks, and debuted at number 75 on the Billboard charts.

Maroulis performed "The Star-Spangled Banner" at the 2013 Opening Day festivities for the New York Yankees. He has sung the Anthem at additional sporting events, including at the Reality All-Star Soccer Festival (organized by Survivor: Africa winner, Ethan Zohn) in April 2007, as well as before the start of a 49ers/Bengals football game at Monster Stadium, San Francisco in December 2007. The performance was hailed by commentator Bryant Gumbel as "a stirring performance." Maroulis has also performed the Anthem at Madison Square Garden in April 2009, and he performed God Bless America at the 2009 Men's U.S. Open. On July 4, 2009, Maroulis sang the National Anthem at the official ceremonies to re-open the Statue of Liberty's crown to the public, for the first time since its closure after 9/11.

Maroulis (supported by Ben Phillips, guitarist/vocalist for the NYC-based bands Famous and The Pretty Reckless) embarked on another solo tour in February 2008, playing to sold-out venues in Boston, Philadelphia, New York City, Annapolis, Maryland, and Los Angeles. On June 22 he performed at Mattison Park in Asbury Park, NJ as part of the 3rd Annual Wave Gathering featuring 175 Emerging Musical Artists.

On October 24, 2008 Maroulis appeared on an episode of Don't Forget the Lyrics! as a contestant. As a result of his appearance on the show, $25,000 was given to the charitable organization Broadway Cares/Equity Fights AIDS.

In September 2009, Maroulis launched his "A Night at the Rock Show" series of sold-out solo shows in New York City, featuring "Constantine's unique interpretations of some of the greatest rock songs of all time," and backed by an all-star band.

Maroulis returned to the Idol stage to perform on April 7, 2011, where he debuted his single, "Unchained Melody". At the same time he also released his rendition of Chicago's 25 or 6 to 4, as recorded live at a Night at the Rock Show performance.

Maroulis has been a regular contributor to the Loukoumi series of children's books by author Nick Katsoris, providing the voice of Gus the Bear. In July 2011, he joined forces with Disney/Fisher-Price to become spokesman for their latest interactive plush toy, Rock Star Mickey. In conjunction with this project, Maroulis released a new single, an updated version of the Kinks' classic "You Really Got Me".

Maroulis partnered with the New York-based 1980s tribute band Jessie's Girl and frequently performed with them at various concerts and private events. At a concert held on July 18, 2014, at Tanner Park, Long Island, over 8000 people came to see him perform with the band. Maroulis also regularly performed with the Rock of Ages NJ band; along with entrepreneur Barry Habib.

In 2015, Maroulis recorded a version of the Lita Ford/Ozzy Osbourne duet "Close My Eyes Forever" with the New York-based band SYKA. The song was also released as a video. That September, Maroulis took part in the Rock in Rio festival in Rio de Janeiro. Maroulis formed MarKolTop Productions, with Diego Kolankowsky and Joanna Topetzes. Spring Awakening received a nomination for a Tony Award for Best Revival of a Musical.

Maroulis released "Here I Come", on January 29, 2016, and "She's Just Rock'n'Roll" in March. On February 18, 2016, with other American Idol alums, Maroulis returned to the show for its fifteenth season to mentor contestants and participate in Duets Week, where he performed "Bohemian Rhapsody" with Shelbie Zora and performed "My Funny Valentine" with Jenn Blosil. At the season finale, Maroulis returned with other former Idol contestants to celebrate the end of the series finale, where he performed a rock medley with Chris Daughtry, Bo Bice, Caleb Johnson and James Durbin, and a country music medley with Bucky Covington, Scotty McCreery, Ace Young and others.

Maroulis partnered with Scott Bradlee's band Postmodern Jukebox in early 2018 and performed a number of concerts with them around the United States and Canada. In spring 2018, Maroulis joined the rock band Adler's Appetite, created by Guns n'Roses' original drummer, Steven Adler, to join them on tour in Australia in May 2018 and for future dates. He headlined the "Off the Record Music Festival" in Atlantic City, New Jersey in June 2018.

== Acting career ==
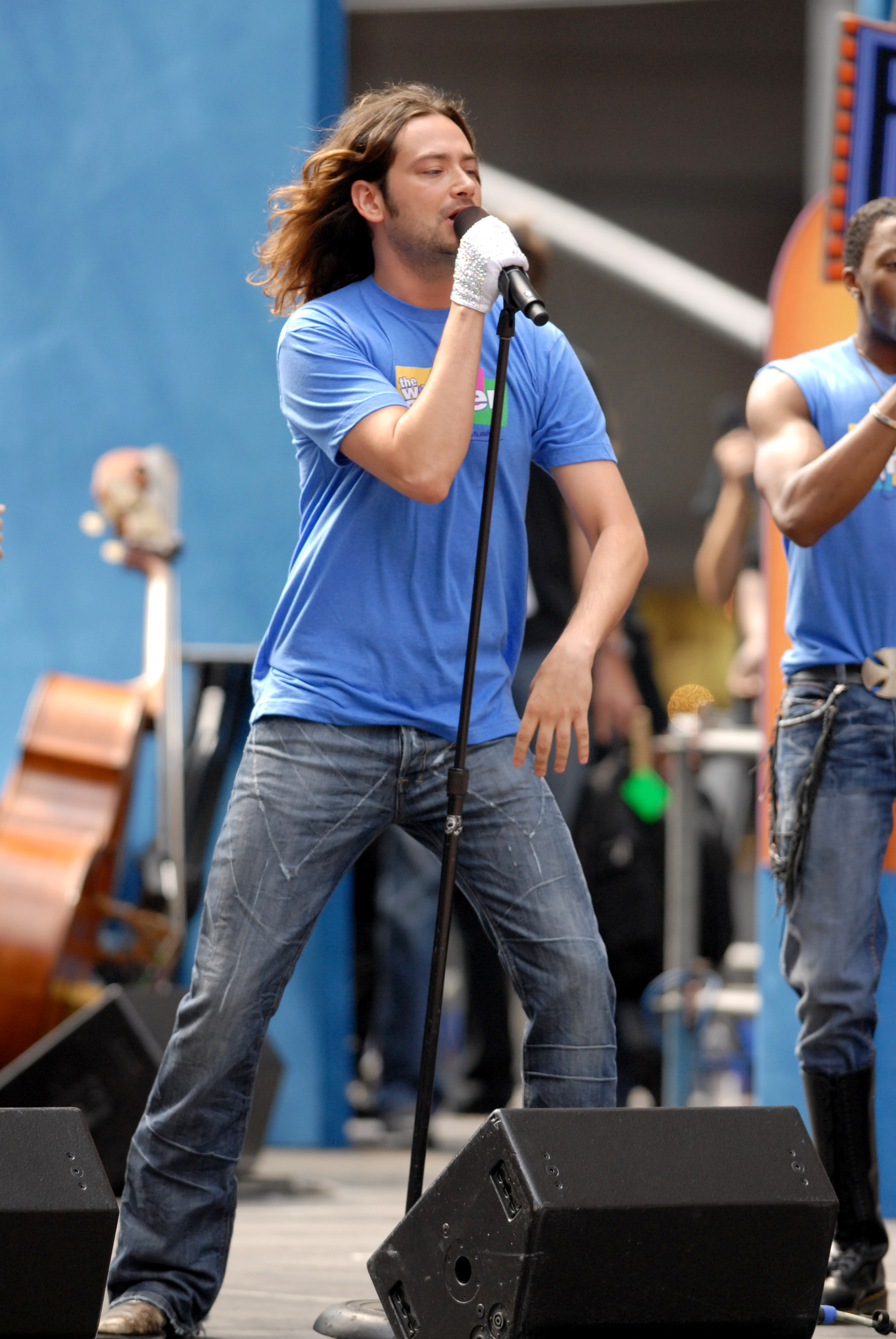
Maroulis during The Wedding Singer.

In the fall of 2005, Maroulis was in negotiations to star in a television sitcom called Brooklyn that was to be loosely based on his upbringing as the youngest of three in a large Greek-American family of New York. ABC bought rights to the show, but passed on the project before it passed the script stage.

Maroulis joined the cast of the Broadway musical The Wedding Singer in the role of Sammy in September 2006. Along with the other cast members, he contributed a recording of the Adam Sandler "Hanukkah Song" to the 8th Carols for a Cure CD to help raise funds for the Broadway Cares/Equity Fights AIDS organization.

Beginning on January 9, 2007, Maroulis took over the role of "Young Soldier" in the Off-Broadway musical revue, Jacques Brel is Alive and Well and Living in Paris where he performed through the end of February. That spring, Maroulis joined the lineup on Good Day New York, serving as the show's resident American Idol expert, while simultaneously taking on the same role as Idol commentator for Yahoo! Buzz. Later that year, Maroulis joined the cast of The Bold and the Beautiful for a limited run as Constantine Parros, a singer and record producer, a role created specially for him.

March 2008 saw Maroulis joining the cast of American Idol Extra as cohost, along with fellow Idol alum Gina Glocksen and J.D. Roberto. His next major role occurred that June, when Constantine starred as Judas Iscariot in the Premier Theatre Company's production of Jesus Christ Superstar. Constantine had previously played the role of Jesus in an earlier production when he was much younger.

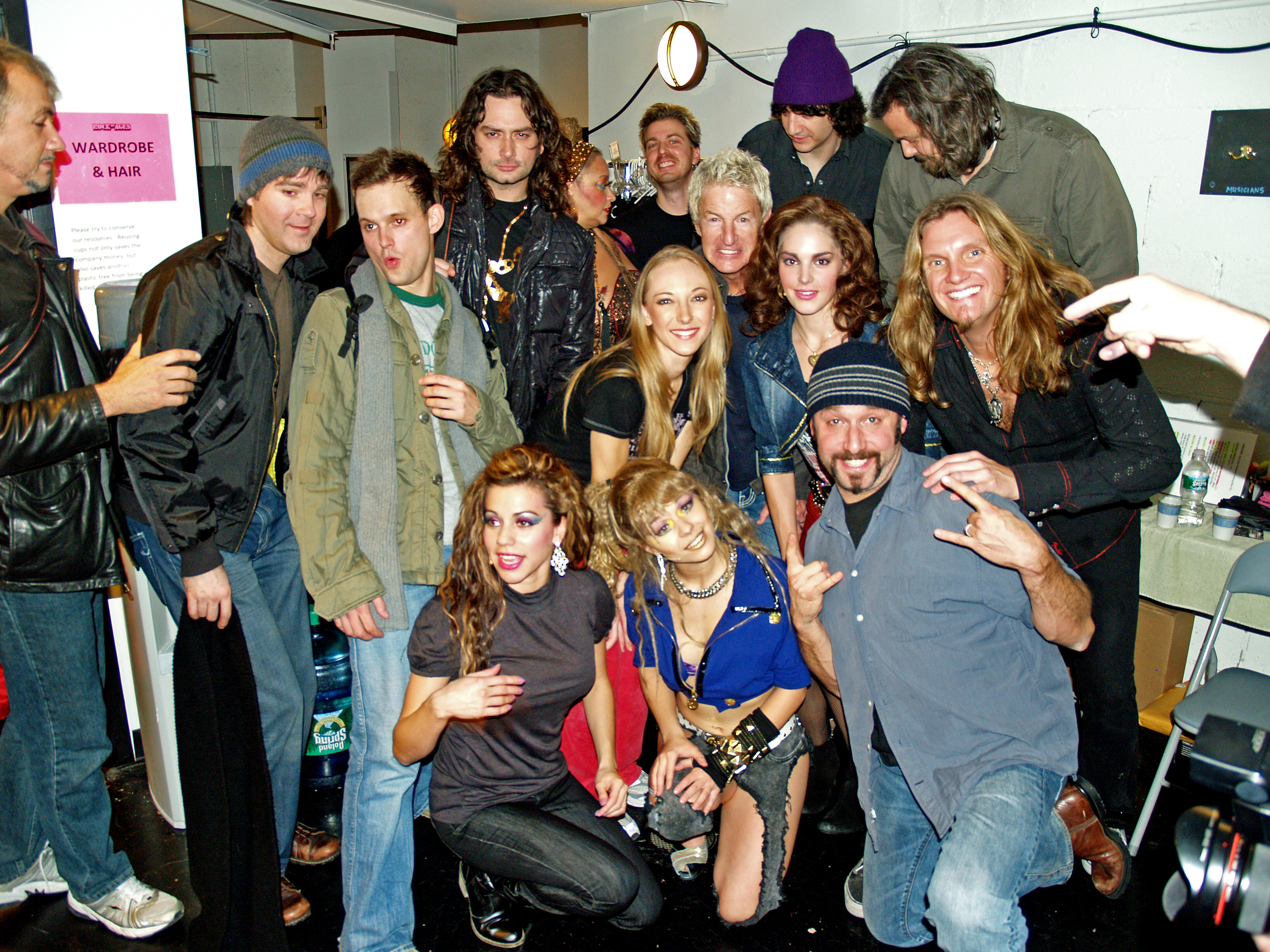
Maroulis and the Rock of Ages cast backstage with Kevin Cronin.

Maroulis achieved particular success starring as Drew in the hit Broadway musical Rock of Ages, featuring the music of 1980s rock legends including Journey, Bon Jovi, and Twisted Sister. The production began running Off-Broadway at the New World Stages in October 2008, moving to Broadway to the Brooks Atkinson Theatre on April 7, 2009. Rolling Stone stated that the "play has found a perfect lead in American Idol rocker Constantine Maroulis," while Associated Press added that Maroulis "gives a touching performance and sings powerfully as Drew, the young wannabe rock singer." Maroulis' vocal performances were particularly praised, with The New York Times describing his voice as "soulful, pure, and intense," and the Chicago Tribune singling out his "dazzling vocal pyrotechnics" as a standout in the production. On May 5, 2009, Maroulis received a nomination for the Tony Award for Best Performance by a Leading Actor in a Musical. From Broadway, Maroulis headlined the national touring production, with the first show opening in Chicago on September 21, 2010, and his last performance on July 24, 2011 at the National Theatre in Washington, DC. Maroulis had a cameo as a record producer in the film version of Rock of Ages, released in June 2012.

Maroulis was cast as Melvin Ferd the Third, in The Alley Theatre's production of The Toxic Avenger, which performed in Houston, Texas, from January 13, 2012, through February 12, 2012. The Houston Chronicle praised the production as being "brilliant," adding that "[the] casting is nothing short of miraculous" and "Mr. Maroulis' voice is a gorgeous, crystal-clear, unwavering, bright tenor instrument that will blow you away."

In 2012, Maroulis became the host of a new series on Fuse.tv.com, Unofficial Idol Forum. Maroulis interviewed Idol contestants as well as interacted with American Idol fans via social media sites such as Twitter and Facebook, soliciting questions and feedback about each week's Idol broadcast.

In autumn 2012, Maroulis took on the title role(s) in Frank Wildhorn's Jekyll and Hyde, co-starring with Deborah Cox, which arrived on Broadway after a 25-week national tour. Previews for the touring production were held at La Mirada Theatre for the Performing Arts in La Mirada, California, from September 7 to 30, 2012. It opened on Broadway at the New York Marriott Marquis Theater on April 18, 2013, after previews beginning on April 5, with its last performance on 12 May. The New York Times stated that Maroulis meets "[the] challenges of Mr. Wildhorn's score with aplomb" and "I was also impressed by Mr. Maroulis' quietly intense performance as the obsessive Dr. Jekyll." The New York Daily News adds that "[Maroulis] knows how to build drama in a song and makes the familiar "This Is the Moment" fresh. He impresses." For his performance in this dual role, Maroulis received a Drama League Award Nomination for a Distinguished Performance Award.

Maroulis has guest starred on various television programs including Law & Order: Special Victims Unit, Z Rock, Unforgettable, and Madam Secretary, as well as web series such as Mozart in the Jungle and Kittens in a Cage.

On July 23, 2014, it was announced that Maroulis would be returning to Rock of Ages as Drew for a twelve-week engagement at the Helen Hayes Theater beginning August 4, 2014. As of October 21, Maroulis' return was extended to January 18, 2015; the show's final closing date on Broadway.

In 2015, Maroulis was featured in a commercial campaign for La-Z-Boy furniture portraying Brooke Shields's fictional Greek lover.

In spring 2016, Maroulis was cast as Nate in Sofia Alvarez' Friend Art from Second Stage Theatre at the McGinn/Cazale Theater. In March 2017, Maroulis joined The Most Beautiful Room in New York as Sergio, which had its world premiere in May 2017 at Long Wharf Theatre in New Haven, Connecticut. Maroulis portrayed Judas Iscariot in Jesus Christ Superstar for the June 2017 production at The Muny. That summer, Maroulis was cast as Che in Evita at North Shore Music Theatre in Beverly, Massachusetts, running from September 26 through October 8, 2017. Maroulis played Robert Moses in the musical, Bulldozer: The Ballad of Robert Moses in November 2017. Reprising the title role, Maroulis performed in the spring 2018 production of Jekyll and Hyde at the Sandler Center for the Performing Arts in Virginia Beach, Virginia. Maroulis returned to North Shore Music Theatre in autumn 2018, this time again reprising the title role of Jekyll and Hyde.

In 2019, he played The Wolf/Cinderella's Prince in Into the Woods at the Patchogue Theatre.

In 2023, he played Alan Freed in an Off-Broadway production of Rock and Roll Man at the New World Stages from June 3 through November 5.

In 2024, Maroulis starred in East Carson Street at Axelrod Performing Art Center'sBell Theater.

== Awards ==
Maroulis was the recipient of the Hellenic Times Scholarship Fund's Humanitarian Award for Artistic Achievement in 2007. These annual awards recognizing outstanding achievement in the Greek-American community are presented to "individuals who have proven that hard work and dedication lead to achievement, thereby setting a perfect example for the HTSF scholarship recipients to emulate." That same year, he was also honored with an award from New York City Comptroller William C. Thompson, Jr. at the sixth annual Greek Heritage and Culture Celebration; honoring individuals recognized as leaders in the Greek Community.

For his performance in the role of Drew in Rock of Ages, Maroulis received a nomination for the Tony Award for Best Performance by a Leading Actor in a Musical; one of five total Tony nominations received by Rock of Ages. For this role he also received a Drama League Award Nomination for a Distinguished Performance Award.

Inside Broadway, the not-for-profit educational organization noted for its efforts in introducing musical theater to young audiences in the New York City area, presented Constantine with a Broadway Beacon Award on June 25, 2009. These awards are given to individuals in recognition of their support of theater and arts education for the inspiration of young people.

On July 1, 2009, after a matinee performance of Rock of Ages, Maroulis and the rest of the cast set a new Guinness World Record for the Largest Air Guitar Ensemble. A total of 810 participants, including audience members and fans, shattered the previous record of 440 people playing air guitar simultaneously.

Maroulis was selected as Broadway.com's "Broadway Star of the Year" for 2009, after receiving over 25,000 votes from Broadway fans and readers of the site.

In March 2010, Maroulis received the honor of being immortalized in a caricature at Sardi's, taking his place alongside other Broadway luminaries similarly honored at the legendary New York City establishment. A month later, the Rock of Ages star was immortalized in a second portrait; this time joining the ranks of the famous on the Broadway Wall of Fame at Tony's di Napoli, also in New York City. On April 26, 2010, Maroulis was honored by the New York City Council for his achievements, at a Council event celebrating the 189th year of Greek Independence.

Maroulis was selected by the Greek America Foundation as one of their "Forty Under 40" winners for 2010. This award recognizes the accomplishments of notable young Greek Americans, who stand out as leaders and who are dedicated to the Greek community.

In June 2011, Maroulis was the recipient of a Gabby Award presented by the Greek America Foundation, in the category of Performing Arts. The Gabby Awards are awarded in recognition of outstanding achievement by those considered as amongst "the best and the brightest" in the Greek community.

Maroulis received the 2011 Spotlight Award from the Elios Society, which honors the achievement of Greek-Americans in the arts and entertainment field.

In 2013, Maroulis received a Drama League Award Nomination for a Distinguished Performance Award for his performance in the title role of Jekyll and Hyde.

Maroulis was the first-ever recipient of the Loukoumi "Make a Difference" Award, in January 2015. The award recognized his contributions to the entertainment world and in particular acknowledged his ongoing efforts to support and inspire children.

== Personal life ==
On December 23, 2010, Maroulis and his then girlfriend, former Rock of Ages chorus girl co-star Angel Reed, welcomed the arrival of their daughter, Malena James Reed-Maroulis. Maroulis and Reed met on the show in 2008. On August 12, 2015, Maroulis was arrested for domestic violence after an altercation with Reed. He was then arrested a second time on August 16, 2015 for violating a restraining order, by sending her an email. Maroulis was promptly released and alleged that he had acted in self-defense. On September 16, 2015, Reed asked that all charges be dropped and the court did so.

== Discography ==
=== Albums ===
Year	Album details	Peak chart positions			Certifications (sales threshold)
Year	Album details	US	US Indie	US Heat	Certifications (sales threshold)
2005	Pray for the Soul of Betty: Released: May 10, 2005; Label: Baby Julius/Koch Records; Format: CD	129	7	2	US sales: 7,500
2007	Constantine: Released: August 7, 2007; Label: 6th Place Records; Format: CD	75	9	—	US sales: 25,000
2020	Until I'm Wanted: Released: July 10, 2020; Label: Noble Steed Music; Format: CD and digital	—	—	—	
"—" denotes releases that did not chart

=== Singles ===
- 2005: "My Funny Valentine" on American Idol Season 4: The Showstoppers
- 2005: "Bohemian Rhapsody" on Killer Queen: A Tribute to Queen
- 2006: "Hanukkah Song" on Broadway's Greatest Gifts: Carols For A Cure Vol. 8
- 2009: "I'll Be Home for Christmas/Christmas in America" (duet with Orfeh) on New York City Christmas: A Benefit Album for ASTEP
- 2011: "Unchained Melody" (released as single)
- 2011: "25 or 6 to 4" (released as single)
- 2011: "You Really Got Me" (released as single)
- 2011: "Down Flew the Doves" (with Tim Prottey-Jones) on Surrounded by the Sounds
- 2015: "All I Ask" from Kittens in a Cage (video series)
- 2015: "Close My Eyes Forever" (with SYKA) on Stay Wild
- 2016: "Here I Come"
- 2016: "She's Just Rock 'n' Roll"
- 2017: "All About You"
- 2018: "All About You" (acoustic version)
- 2023: "Daydream"
- 2023: "Comeback"

=== Other releases ===
- 2007: Growing Up With Loukoumi as Gus The Bear
- 2009: Loukoumi's Good Deeds as Gus The Bear
- 2009: Rock of Ages: Original Broadway Cast Recording
- 2009: Loukoumi's Gift as Gus The Bear
- 2012: Rock of Ages: Motion Picture Soundtrack
- 2012: Jekyll and Hyde: 2012 Concept Recording
- 2013: Loukoumi and the Schoolyard Bully as Gus The Bear
- 2016: Welcome to Our Christmas Party (with Band of Merrymakers)
