= Queen CD Single Box =

CD Single Box
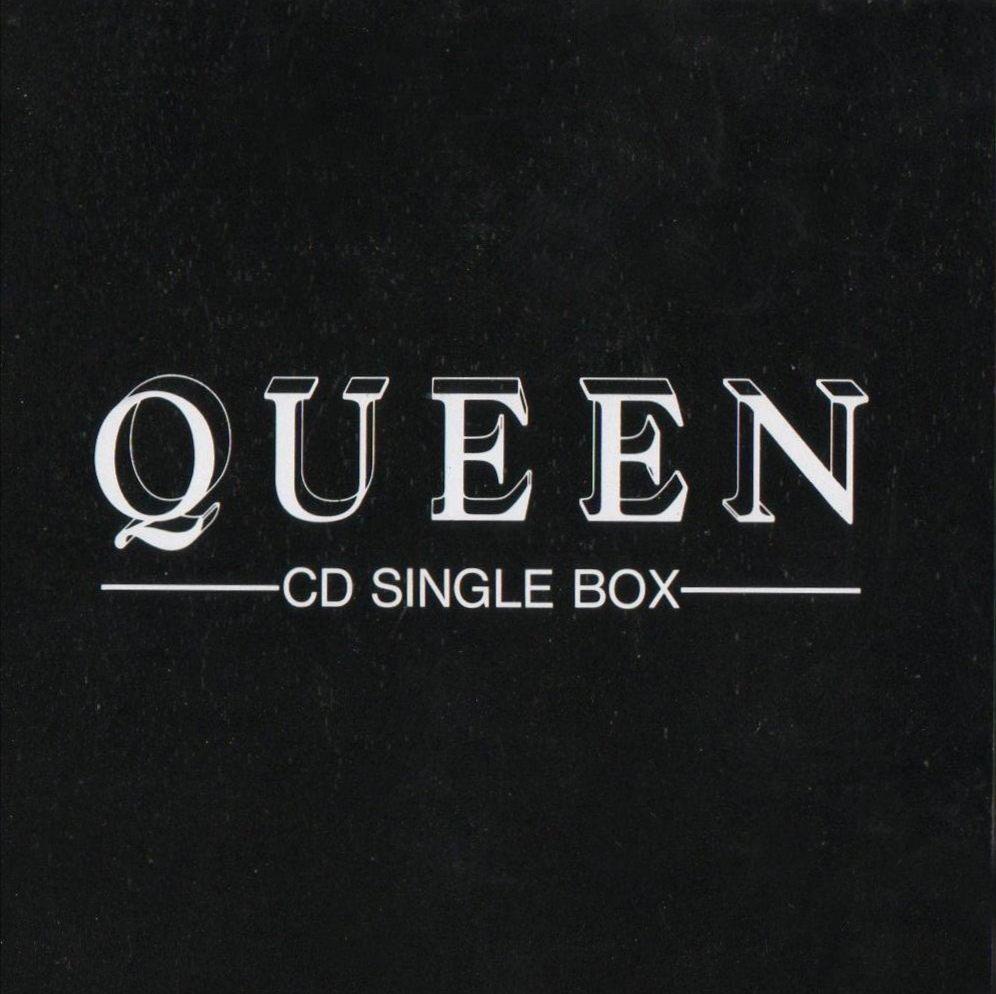

Compilation album by Queen
- Released: 26 April 1991 (Japan)
- Recorded: 1973–1986
- Genre: Rock
- Length: 1:47:40
- Label: EMI
- Producers: Queen; Mack; Arif Mardin

Queen chronology
Innuendo (1991)	CD Single Box (1991)	Greatest Hits II (1991)

The CD Single Box is a compilation compact disc box set by the British rock band Queen released exclusively in Japan on 26 April 1991 by EMI Records.

== Packaging ==
The CDs are housed inside a gold embossed flip top box with a 48-page booklet which includes the bio, anthology and song lyrics in English and Japanese.

== Contents ==
The box set has 12 x 3" CD single ('Mini Album' written on the reverse of all sleeves) snap-packs (Japanese: 短冊, romanized: tanzaku) which includes twelve hit-singles released between 1973 and 1986. The singles start with the A-side tracks "Seven Seas Of Rhye" through to "A Kind Of Magic" complete with B-sides. The few non-album B-sides included are "See What a Fool I've Been", "Soul Brother", "I Go Crazy" and "A Dozen Red Roses for My Darling". The compact discs are 3-inch or (8 cm), with sleeves called snap-packs, as they could be "snapped and folded" into a small square. Almost all of the writing is in Japanese.

All CDs have three tracks each, apart from "Queen's First E.P.", which has four. The set features artwork from the original UK 7" vinyl releases, except the "Seven Seas Of Rhye" (original German sleeve) and "Killer Queen" (original French sleeve).

== Disc and track listing ==
Disc 1: Seven Seas of Rhye
No.	Title	Writer(s)	Length
1.	"Seven Seas of Rhye"	Freddie Mercury	2:51
2.	"See What a Fool I've Been"	Brian May	4:32
3.	"Funny How Love Is"	Mercury	2:50

Disc 2: Killer Queen
No.	Title	Writer(s)	Length
1.	"Killer Queen"	Mercury	3:02
2.	"Flick of the Wrist"	Mercury	3:21
3.	"Brighton Rock"	May	5:10

Disc 3: Bohemian Rhapsody
No.	Title	Writer(s)	Length
1.	"Bohemian Rhapsody"	Mercury	5:59
2.	"I'm in Love with My Car"	Roger Taylor	3:10
3.	"You're My Best Friend"	John Deacon	2:51

Disc 4: Somebody to Love
No.	Title	Writer(s)	Length
1.	"Somebody To Love"	Mercury	4:59
2.	"White Man"	May	5:01
3.	"Tie Your Mother Down"	May	3:46

Disc 5: Queen's First E.P.
No.	Title	Writer(s)	Length
1.	"Good Old-Fashioned Lover Boy"	Mercury	2:56
2.	"Death on Two Legs (Dedicated to...)"	Mercury	3:45
3.	"Tenement Funster"	Taylor	2:58
4.	"White Queen (As It Began)"	May	4:36

Disc 6: We Are The Champions
No.	Title	Writer(s)	Length
1.	"We Are the Champions"	Mercury	3:02
2.	"We Will Rock You"	May	2:02
3.	"Fat Bottomed Girls"	May	3:24

Disc 7: Crazy Little Thing Called Love
No.	Title	Writer(s)	Length
1.	"Crazy Little Thing Called Love"	Mercury	2:46
2.	"Spread Your Wings"	Deacon	4:35
3.	"Flash"	May	2:47

Disc 8: Another One Bites the Dust
No.	Title	Writer(s)	Length
1.	"Another One Bites the Dust"	Deacon	3:38
2.	"Dragon Attack"	May	4:22
3.	"Las Palabras De Amor"	May	4:31

Disc 9: Under Pressure
No.	Title	Writer(s)	Length
1.	"Under Pressure" (featuring David Bowie)	Queen and David Bowie	4:07
2.	"Soul Brother"	Queen	4:29
3.	"Body Language"	Mercury	4:33

Disc 10: Radio Ga Ga
No.	Title	Writer(s)	Length
1.	"Radio Ga Ga"	Taylor	5:49
2.	"I Go Crazy"	May	3:45
3.	"Hammer to Fall"	May	3:39

Disc 11: I Want to Break Free
No.	Title	Writer(s)	Length
1.	"I Want to Break Free"	Deacon	4:25
2.	"Machines (Or 'Back to Humans')"	May, Taylor	5:00
3.	"It's a Hard Life"	Mercury	4:08

Disc 12: A Kind of Magic
No.	Title	Writer(s)	Length
1.	"A Kind of Magic"	Taylor	4:25
2.	"A Dozen Red Roses for My Darling"	Taylor	4:43
3.	"One Vision"	Queen	4:00
Total length:			1:47:40

== See also ==
- Queen discography
