= Killer Queen: A Tribute to Queen =

2005 tribute album by various artists

Compilation album by Various artists
- Released: 9 August 2005
- Recorded: 2005
- Genre: Rock, hard rock
- Length: 64:29
- Label: Hollywood
- Producer: Brian Reeves

Professional ratings
Review scores
Source	Rating
Allmusic	3.5/5 stars
Boston Herald	Favourable
Chartattack.com	Mixed
Rolling Stone	2/5 stars

Killer Queen is a tribute album of Queen songs. The album is named for the 1974 Queen song of the same name that first appeared on the Sheer Heart Attack album. The album peaked at number 104 on the Billboard 200 on 27 August 2005. Later, it re-entered the Billboard 200 in April 2006 at 115 after the Queen round in American Idol's season 5.

== Track listing ==
1. "We Are the Champions" (Freddie Mercury) – performed by Gavin DeGraw
2. "Tie Your Mother Down" (Brian May) – performed by Shinedown
3. "Bohemian Rhapsody" (Mercury) – performed by Constantine Maroulis, with the cast of We Will Rock You
4. "Stone Cold Crazy" (Queen) – performed by Eleven, featuring Josh Homme (of Queens of the Stone Age)
5. "Good Old-Fashioned Lover Boy" (Mercury) – performed by Jason Mraz
6. "Under Pressure" (Queen, David Bowie) – performed by Joss Stone
7. "Who Wants to Live Forever" (May) – performed by Breaking Benjamin
8. "Bicycle Race" (Mercury) – performed by Be Your Own Pet
9. "Crazy Little Thing Called Love" (Mercury) – performed by Josh Kelley
10. "Sleeping on the Sidewalk" (May) – performed by Los Lobos
11. "Killer Queen" (Mercury) – performed by Sum 41
12. "Death on Two Legs (Dedicated to...)" (Mercury) (features the piano intro to "Lazing on a Sunday Afternoon" at the end) – performed by Rooney
13. "Play the Game" (Mercury) – performed by Jon Brion
14. "Bohemian Rhapsody" (Mercury) – performed by The Flaming Lips
15. "'39" (May) – performed by Ingram Hill
16. "Fat Bottomed Girls" (May) – performed by Antigone Rising

== Charts ==
Chart performance for Killer Queen: A Tribute to Queen
Chart (2005)	Peak position
Australian Albums (ARIA)	69
US Billboard 200	104
