= Queen's First E.P. =

1977 EP by Queen

EP by Queen
- Released: 20 May 1977
- Recorded: 1974–1976
- Studio: Various
- Genre: Rock
- Length: 14:10
- Label: EMI
- Producer: Queen

Queen chronology
A Day at the Races (1976)	Queen's First E.P. (1977)	News of the World (1977)

Queen's First E.P. is the first and only extended play released during Freddie Mercury's lifetime by British rock band Queen. It was released on 20 May 1977 by EMI Records. The album consists of four tracks, one from each of their four most recent albums up to that point, with "Good Old-Fashioned Lover Boy" as the lead track.

== Music video ==
In 1977, Queen filmed a promotional video for "Good Old-Fashioned Lover Boy" in the Top of the Pops studios. The music video featured a drastically different arrangement of the song.

== Commercial performance ==
Queen's First E.P. entered the UK Singles Chart at number 36 in the week ending 4 June 1977, peaking at number 17 in early July.

== Release and reception ==
Professional ratings
Review scores
Source	Rating
AllMusic	2/5 stars

Jim Allen of AllMusic wrote that Queen's First E.P. "is a four-song affair featuring one song apiece from A Night at the Opera, A Day at the Races, Sheer Heart Attack, and Queen II. "Tenement Funster", sung by drummer Roger Taylor, is a slice of Bowie-ish glam rock. "White Queen" is a prog-tinged epic ballad. "Good Old-Fashioned Lover Boy" taps into the lighter, music-hall side of Queen, and the scabrous hard rocker "Death on Two Legs" finds the band baring its fangs a bit."

Queen's First E.P. was reissued on CD in 1988 on the CD Single box set through Parlophone Records. In November 2008, it was made available as part of the limited edition CD box set The Singles Collection Volume 1.

On 18 April 2009, the EP was reissued on CD as a part of Record Store Day 2009.

== Track listing ==
All lead vocals by Freddie Mercury, except "Tenement Funster", sung by Roger Taylor.

Side one
No.	Title	Writer(s)	Length
1.	"Good Old-Fashioned Lover Boy"	Freddie Mercury	2:53
2.	"Death on Two Legs (Dedicated to...)"	Mercury	3:43
Total length:			6:36

Side two
No.	Title	Writer(s)	Length
1.	"Tenement Funster"	Roger Taylor	2:59
2.	"White Queen (As It Began)"	Brian May	4:35
Total length:			7:34

== Charts ==
Chart (1977)	Peak position
UK Singles (Official Charts Company)	17

== Release history ==
Date	Region	Label	Format	Catalog number
20 May 1977	United Kingdom	EMI Records	7" Vinyl	EMI 2623
20 May 1977	Holland	EMI Records	7" Vinyl	5C 016-99082
14 November 1988	United Kingdom	Parlophone Records	CD	QUECD5
January 1991	Japan	EMI Records	CD	TODP-2255
17 November 2008	United Kingdom	Parlophone Records	CD	50999 243358 2 9
18 April 2009	United States	Hollywood Records	CD	D000383302
