= Pray for the Soul of Betty (album) =

Studio album by Pray for the Soul of Betty
- Released: May 10, 2005
- Recorded: 2003 in New York City
- Genre: Hard rock
- Length: approx. 41 minutes
- Label: Baby Julius/Koch Records
- Producer: Pray for the Soul of Betty

Professional ratings
Review scores
Source	Rating
Allmusic	2/5 stars

Pray for the Soul of Betty is the only studio album from American hard rock band Pray for the Soul of Betty released on May 10, 2005, self-produced locally by the band, global release courtesy of Koch Entertainment, who released it in two editions, explicit and clean; re-engineered by Michael Burgman and Michael Barlie, re-mastered by Howie Weinburg; arranged, produced and performed by Pray for the Soul of Betty. The tracks were recorded, produced, and distributed locally in 2003 and 2004 by the band personally during live shows. Upon its release, the album scored #129 on The Billboard 200— #2 on Top Heatseekers, #7 on Top Independent Albums, and sold 7,500 on its first week.

== Personnel ==
- Pray for the Soul of Betty (Performance, Arranging, Producers, Writers)
- Charlie Gambetta (Producer)
- Howie Weinburg (Mastering)
- Michael Barlie (Engineer)

== Track listing ==
1. Drift 4:16
2. Rich Bitch 4:30
3. Truck Stop Sally 3:49
4. Some Of My Fucked-Up World 4:36
5. Cut The Cord 4:59
6. Cry 5:09
7. ...The Day 4:22
8. Suicide 3:53
9. Playground 0:13
10. Sylvan 5:49

== Releases ==
- (2005) Koch Records #5837

== Library of Congress ==
- Control Number: 2005589061
- Type of Material: Music sound recording
- Call Numbers: SDB 24318 (Copy 1), SSA 67131 (Copy 2)
- Location: Recorded Sound Reference Center (Madison, LM113)
- Status: Not Charged
- Contents: Drift, Rich bitch, Truck stop Sally, Someofmyfuckedupworld, Cut the cord, Cry, ...The day, Suicide, Playground, Sylvan.
- Description: 1 sound disc : digital; 4 3/4 in.
- Published/Created: New York, N.Y. : s.n., [2004]
- UPC/EAN: 775020633728

== Related albums ==
- Constantine
- Killer Queen: A Tribute to Queen
