= Pray for the Soul of Betty =

American rock band

- Origin: New York City
- Genres: Post-grunge; hard rock
- Years active: 2003-2006
- Label: Baby Julius Productions/Koch Records
- Website: www.myspace.com/prayforthesoulofbetty

Pray for the Soul of Betty (often known by the acronym, PFTSOB) was a hard rock band from New York City. The band consisted of Michael Hamboussi (drums), João Joya (guitar), Taylor, C.R. (bass) and lead vocalist Constantine Maroulis. On March 20, 2006, Maroulis announced his departure on the band's official message board, and on May 13, 2006, drummer Hamboussi posted in his MySpace blog that PFTSOB had officially disbanded.

== History ==
Hamboussi and Joya worked as a drummer-guitarist duo in small bands before the addition of Taylor completed the original lineup. Maroulis was added as the lead vocalist in 2003 after over 150 auditions. When asked about the origin of the band's name, band members answer that they named themselves after the death of their bassist's aunt, though Betty can refer to anyone who is in need of support.

The band toured heavily around the United States and a few other countries (including Japan), simultaneously with the 2003-2004 Broadway touring production of the musical Rent. Maroulis was starring in the lead role of Roger Davis, joining his bandmates for live gigs after performing in the play each night. PFTSOB rose to national attention when Maroulis auditioned for and was selected to appear on the popular television show American Idol. His audition clip showed him "quitting" the band amongst the displeasure of one of his bandmates, which they have claimed is an inaccurate portrayal. Maroulis advanced to become one of the final six contestants on American Idol (season 4), airing in 2005. He was eliminated ahead of the other rocker of the season, Bo Bice, to the chagrin of his many fans.

In the spring of 2005, the band signed a distribution deal with Koch Records, who released a re-engineered version of their eponymous debut on May 10, 2005. (see Pray for the Soul of Betty album) The CD reached No. 129 on the Billboard 200, climbing to No. 7 on the Billboard Top Independent Albums chart and No. 2 on the Billboard Top Heatseekers chart. In January 2006, the band completed a national tour beginning in San Diego and ending in Philadelphia. That March, Maroulis announced that he would be officially leaving Pray for the Soul of Betty to pursue solo projects.

Since the band's breakup, in addition to other projects Maroulis released a solo work, Constantine, which debuted at No. 75 on the Billboard charts. He has achieved particular success acting on Broadway. For his role as Drew in the rock musical Rock of Ages, Maroulis received a nomination for the Tony Award for Best Performance by a Leading Actor in a Musical. He also received the honor of being immortalized in a caricature at Sardi's, taking his place alongside other Broadway luminaries similarly honored at the legendary New York City establishment. (For more detailed information regarding Constantine, see also: Constantine Maroulis.) Hamboussi has also been involved with various music projects in the New York City area, including the band January Jane. Hamboussi and Maroulis served as Creative Directors for Sweetfire Studios, a recording studio in Brooklyn.

== Style and culture ==
The band cites many artists and bands as influences: Audioslave, Velvet Revolver, Incubus, Rage Against the Machine, Red Hot Chili Peppers, Led Zeppelin, Jimi Hendrix and Neil Young. The band has also been compared to Black Sabbath and Nirvana.

== Reviews and public reaction ==
The band received mixed reviews throughout their brief history. The increased national attention after American Idol put PFTSOB into the spotlight, transforming the band from non-notable garage band into public figures.

"Over 600 fans showed up for the sold-out event to see their favorite Idol perform with the band in what can only be described as high-energy rock. The predominantly female audience went crazy with excitement as the group took to the stage and never let up until they brought the house down on the last song."—Tricia Spears, Soundmusic.net

"Their hard, brash, NY rock is complemented by their new songs which are powerful, thoughtful, and focus on the love we have in front of us. Constantine's training gave his performance a professional edge, and, combined with the skill and maturity of their instrumentals, the band proved they have earned the critical acclaim they've received."—Janice French, GarageRadio.com

"Thanks, Betty for waking me up.loud and rocking clear! I haven't been this giddy for a new band in a long time."—Linda Dale MacLean, The Celebrity Cafe

== Discography ==
- 2005: Pray For The Soul of Betty

== See also ==
- Constantine Maroulis
- Spahn Ranch
