= The Hunters (instrumental band) =

British instrumental band

- Origin: Cheshunt, Hertfordshire, United Kingdom
- Past members: Norman Sheffield [Drums]; Norman Stracey [Rhythm Guitar]; Brian Parker [Lead Guitar]; Johnny Rogers [Bass Guitar]; Billy Kuy [Bass Guitar]

The Hunters were a British instrumental band from the late 1950s to early 1960s.

Originating from the Cheshunt area of Hertfordshire and formed from the remnants of The Parker Royal Five, The Hunters found work as a backing group for touring US stars such as Bobby Rydell, Jimmy Jones in the UK, and British-based artists The Allisons, Frank Ifield, The Avons, Mark Wynter, Kenny Lynch and Michael Cox. Their first major hit was "Sweet Dreams" on the Columbia label as the backing band to singer Dave Sampson, which reached No. 29 in May 1960. Sampson had written the song whilst at the Curry Bazaar Indian Restaurant in Wardour Street, London West End in October 1959 with friend and neighbour Cliff Richard in mind but record producer Norrie Paramor thought that the song would suit Sampson more. They followed up with a release of their first track "Teen Scene" on the Fontana label in the same year, although it did not actually chart. Further releases followed backing Dave Sampson and also without him as instrumentalists in a dual career that spanned 1960 and 1961. Though not denting the UK Singles Chart, the band's singles sold enough for Fontana to grant them an album release in 1961 followed by a second the next year. The band in total released four singles and one EP with Dave Sampson on Columbia Records and five singles (one uncredited) plus two albums on Fontana between 1960 and 1964.

The Dutch rock band Golden Earring was named after their single "Golden Earrings" which was most likely inspired by the spy-fi movie from 1947 with the same title.

The band also appeared behind Cliff Richard (a contemporary from Cheshunt) as The Shadows, when the latter were unavailable due to a car accident, including an appearance on the Sunday Night at the London Palladium TV show in 1958 and the NME Poll Winners Concert at Wembley Empire Pool in 1959. Instrumental tracks from the band have often been mistaken as that of The Shadows and retrospectively people have often wrongly assumed that The Hunters were copyists. In truth, there were a number of instrumental bands around in the very late 1950s and early 1960s, who played in a similar style and their sound was more a product of the guitars and equipment available at the time.

After The Hunters, lead guitarist Brian Parker, bass guitarist John Rogers, and rhythm guitarist Norman Stracey were in The Roulettes (though not all at the same time), a band that was employed as the backing group to singer Adam Faith. Parker quickly moved on and with friend Buster Meikle from The Parker Royal Five, his earlier band from Cheshunt, went on to found and have a No. 1 chart success with the band Unit 4 + 2. Drummer Norman Sheffield went on to launch Trident Studios with his brother in London, used by many famous recording artists of the late sixties and seventies most notably Queen, whom Sheffield managed in the early years of their career, leading to their first chart success.

In 1994, the band performed at the Pipeline Instrumental Rock Convention in London, and again in 2000. More recently, The Hunters found new success when their instrumental track "Teen Scene" featured in the 2009 movie An Education.

== Band members ==
The Hunters

- Norman Sheffield – Drums, percussion (b. Norman J. Sheffield, 25 September 1939, Enfield, Middlesex – d. 20 June 2014, Cornwall)
- Norman Stracey – Rhythm Guitar, songwriter (b. Norman Henry Stracey, 1941, Ware, Hertfordshire)
- Brian Parker – Lead Guitar, songwriter (b. Brian William Parker, 7 December 1939, Cheshunt, Hertfordshire – d. 17 February 2001, Cheshunt)
- John Rogers – Bass guitar (b. John Rogers, 1941, Hertfordshire – d. 27 May 1963, Lincolnshire, from injuries sustained in car crash)
- Billy Kuy – Bass Guitar on reunions after John Rogers death in May 1963 (b. William John Kuy Junior, 12 December 1940)

Dave Sampson and The Hunters

- Dave Sampson – lead vocals (b. David John Bernard Sampson 9 January 1941, Uttoxeter, Staffordshire – d. 5 March 2014)

== Discography ==
=== Singles / EPs ===
As Dave Sampson and The Hunters

- "Sweet Dreams" / "It's Lonesome" – Columbia DB 4449 May 1960, UK #29.
- "See You Around" / "If You Need Me" – Columbia DB 4502 Sep 1960
- "Why The Chicken?" / "1999" (Dave Sampson) – Columbia DB 4597 Mar 1961
- "Easy To Dream / "That's All" – Columbia DB 4625 Apr 1961
- EP "Dave" – "Talkin' In My Sleep" / "Goodbye Twelve, Hello Teens" / "Little Girl of Mine" / "Walking To Heaven" – Columbia SEG 8095 1961

As The Hunters (without Dave Sampson)

- "Teen Scene" / "Santa Monica Flyer" – Fontana H 276 Nov 1960
- "Golden Earrings" / "Tally Ho" – Fontana H 303 Mar 1961
- "The Storm" / "How's M'Chicks?" – Fontana H 323 Aug 1961
- "Teen Scene" (re-release) / "Someone Else's Baby" – Fontana TF 514 Nov 1964

As Dave Sampson (with accompaniment)

- "Wide, Wide World" / "Since Sandy Moved Away" – Fontana H 361 Jan 1962

=== Albums ===
- Teen Scene The Hunters play The Big Hits – Fontana TFL 5140 (1961)
- Hits from The Hunters – Fontana TFL 5175 (1962)
