= The Prophet's Song =

Song by Queen

from the album A Night at the Opera
- Published: Queen Music Ltd.
- Released: 28 November 1975
- Recorded: 1975
- Studio: Sarm East, London
- Genre: Progressive rock; art rock; hard rock
- Length: 8:21
- Label: EMI
- Songwriter: Brian May
- Producers: Roy Thomas Baker; Queen

"The Prophet's Song" is a song by the British rock band Queen, written by their guitarist Brian May, originally released on their fourth studio album A Night at the Opera in 1975. It is the longest song with vocals produced by the band.

== Background ==
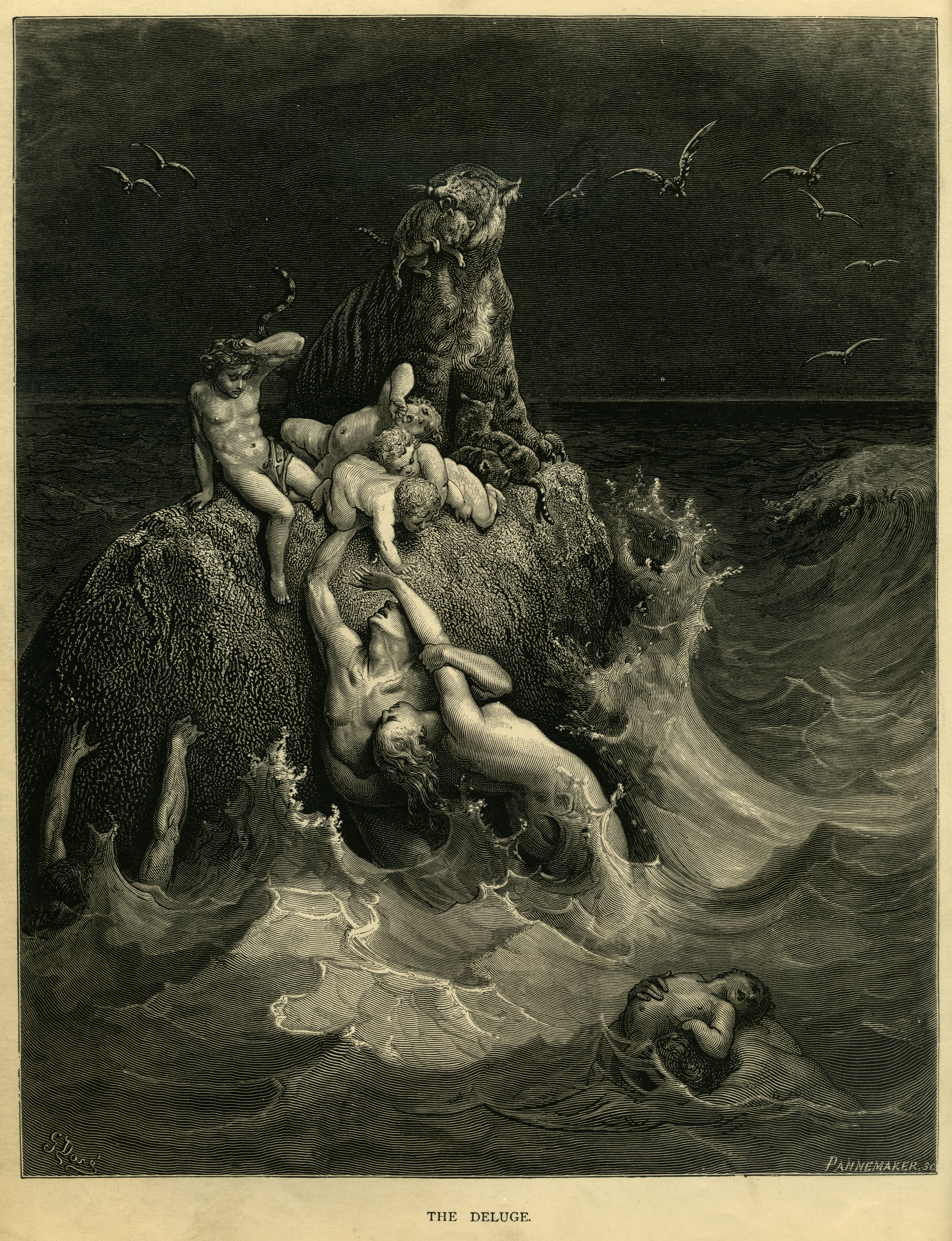
"The Deluge", frontispiece to Gustave Doré's illustrated edition of the Bible; after having a dream about a flood, Brian May was inspired to write a song about it.

"The Prophet's Song" was composed by Brian May (working title "People of the Earth") and is the longest Queen song, at 8 minutes and 21 seconds, exceeding "Bohemian Rhapsody" by 2 minutes and 22 seconds. On the show In the Studio with Redbeard, which spotlighted A Night at the Opera, he explained that he wrote the song after a dream he had about a great flood while he was recovering from being ill while recording Sheer Heart Attack, using the dream as his source for some of the lyrics.

May spent several days putting it together, and it includes a vocal canon sung by Freddie Mercury. The vocal, and later instrumental canon was produced by early tape delay devices. It is a heavy and dark number with a strong progressive rock influence and challenging lead vocals. At over eight minutes in length, it is also Queen's longest song with vocals, though the untitled instrumental track from Queen's last studio album, Made in Heaven, is about 14 minutes longer. May also tuned the guitar's lowest E2 string down to a D2 note for a moodier sound.

May plays a non-standard Queen instrument, a toy koto, during the introduction and closing "wind" sections of the song. Producer Roy Thomas Baker recalled in a documentary of the making of the song that the wind effect was created by recording the sound of an air-conditioning unit through a phaser.

As detailed by May in a documentary about the album, the speed-up effect that happens in the middle of the guitar solo was achieved by starting a reel-to-reel player with the tape on it, as the original tape player was stopped.

The lyric refers to the Book of Genesis, explicitly in examples such as "return like the white dove" (a reference to the story of Noah's Ark), and cryptically in examples such as a vision of a "moonlit stair" comparable to Jacob's Ladder.

The ending of the song overlaps with the following song, Mercury's "Love Of My Life".

== Reception ==
AllMusic has called the song "mystical prog rock", citing it as an epic as fascinating as "Bohemian Rhapsody" and one of Queen's finest studio achievements. Rolling Stone also praised it, naming it as the record's "best track", noting that "May's powerful guitar perfectly complements the rich, multitracked harmonies of lead singer Freddie Mercury." Ultimate Classic Rock also called the song "epic and mystical art rock".

== Personnel ==
Information is taken from the album's liner notes and the Queen Songs website

- Freddie Mercury – lead and backing vocals
- Brian May – toy koto, acoustic guitar, electric guitar, backing vocals
- Roger Taylor – drums, backing vocals
- John Deacon – bass guitar
