= Dave Sampson =

British singer (1941–2014)

David John Bernard Sampson (9 January 1941 – 5 March 2014) was an English rock singer who released a number of singles in the early 1960s on Columbia Records.

== Life and career ==
Sampson was born in Uttoxeter, Staffordshire, England. Upon completing his education, he worked as an errand boy in the advertising industry. In his spare time he recorded songs and dropped one of his demo's with Cliff Richard who got him a recording contract.

He had a UK hit single in May 1960 with his backing band, The Hunters, with "Sweet Dreams", which peaked at number 29 on the UK Singles Chart. "Sweet Dreams" was released on the Columbia Records label, and spent six weeks on the chart.

His first ever recording was a four-tune EP demo with Steve Laine, later of the Liverpool Five. Both were singers on the EP with a backing band that was never named but included Don Groom on drums, John Milner on bass and Tony Haslett on guitar. His lack of subsequent chart presence left him listed as a one-hit wonder while he moved to Hamburg. There he played at the Star Club, until he returned to England and opened a record shop in Walthamstow.

A collection of his early material was released in the 1990s and he appeared at occasional nostalgia shows.

Sampson died at Colchester Hospital, Colchester, Essex, in March 2014, aged 73.

== Discography ==
=== Singles ===
- "Sweet Dreams" / "It's Lonesome" (with The Hunters) – Columbia 1960
- "See You Around" / "If You Need Me" (with The Hunters) – Columbia 1960
- "Why The Chicken?" / "1999" (with The Hunters) – Columbia 1961
- "Easy To Dream" / "That's All" (with The Hunters) – Columbia 1961
- "Wide, Wide World" / "Since Sandy Moved Away" (solo) – Fontana 1962

=== Albums ===
A compilation album, Sweet Dreams: the Complete Dave Sampson & the Hunters, was released in 1999, and included the following songs:

1. "Sweet Dreams"
2. "It's Lonesome"
3. "If You Need Me"
4. "See You Around"
5. "Why The Chicken"
6. "1999"
7. "Goodbye Twelve Hello Teens"
8. "Talkin' In My Sleep"
9. "Little Girl of Mine"
10. "Walking To Heaven"
11. "Easy To Dream"
12. "That's All"
13. "I've Got A Crush on You"
14. "Don't Fool Around"
15. "Why The Chicken" (orchestral version)
16. "Teenage Dreams"
17. "Wide Wide World"
18. "Since Sandy Moved Away"
19. "My Blue Heaven" (demo)
20. "Sweet Dreams" (demo)
