= Wyckoff School District =

School district in Bergen County, New Jersey, US

Address
- 241 Morse Avenue Wyckoff, Bergen County, New Jersey, 07481; United States
- Coordinates: 41.010344°N 74.16976°W

District information
- Grades: PreK-8
- Superintendent: Kerry Postma
- Business administrator: Patricia Salvati
- Schools: 5

Students and staff
- Enrollment: 1,932 (as of 2020–21)
- Faculty: 179.2 FTEs
- Student–teacher ratio: 10.8:1

Other information
- District Factor Group: I
- Website: www.wyckoffps.org
Ind.	Per pupil	District spending	Rank (*)	K-8 average	%± vs. average
1A	Total Spending	$18,633	63	$18,891	−1.4%
1	Budgetary Cost	15,312	67	14,159	8.1%
2	Classroom Instruction	8,985	59	8,659	3.8%
6	Support Services	2,612	74	2,167	20.5%
8	Administrative Cost	1,982	84	1,547	28.1%
10	Operations & Maintenance	1,658	55	1,612	2.9%
13	Extracurricular Activities	69	22	104	−33.7%
16	Median Teacher Salary	64,822	64	61,136
Data from NJDoE 2014 Taxpayers' Guide to Education Spending. *Of K-8 districts with more than 750 students. Lowest spending=1; Highest=84

The Wyckoff School District is a community public school district, serving students in pre-kindergarten through eighth grade from Wyckoff in Bergen County, in the U.S. state of New Jersey.

As of the 2020–21 school year, the district, comprising five schools, had an enrollment of 1,932 students and 179.2 classroom teachers (on an FTE basis), for a student–teacher ratio of 10.8:1.

The district is classified by the New Jersey Department of Education as being in District Factor Group "I", the second-highest of eight groupings. District Factor Groups organize districts statewide to allow comparison by common socioeconomic characteristics of the local districts. From lowest socioeconomic status to highest, the categories are A, B, CD, DE, FG, GH, I and J.

Public high school students from Wyckoff in ninth through twelfth grades attend the schools of the Ramapo Indian Hills Regional High School District, which also serves students from Franklin Lakes and Oakland. Students entering the district as freshmen have the option to attend either of the district's high schools, subject to a choice made during eighth grade. Franklin Lakes, Oakland and Wyckoff (FLOW district) approved the creation of a regional high school in 1954. Schools in the district (with 2020–21 enrollment data from the National Center for Education Statistics) are Indian Hills High School, located in Oakland (919 students) and Ramapo High School, located in Franklin Lakes (1,285 students).

== History ==
The first school in the town was a one-room school built on Wyckoff Avenue in 1869 and used until 1906, when it was demolished. The first George Washington School had been used but was burned in a fire in 1911. Prior to 1929, high school students attended Central High School in Paterson, before the Board of Education voted to send students to Ramsey High School in Ramsey instead.

== Awards and recognition ==
For the 1998–99 school year, Eisenhower Middle School was named a "Star School" by the New Jersey Department of Education, the highest honor that a New Jersey school can achieve. In the 2003–04 school year, it received the Blue Ribbon Award from the United States Department of Education, the highest honor that an American school can achieve.

For the 2005–06 school year, the Wyckoff School District was recognized with the "Best Practices Award" by the New Jersey Department of Education for its "A Reading Af'fair' to Remember" Language Arts Literacy program at Abraham Lincoln School.

== Schools ==
Schools in the district (with 2020–21 enrollment data from the National Center for Education Statistics) are:

Elementary schools

- Calvin Coolidge Elementary School, with 289 students in grades K-5, located at 420 Grandview Avenue, is an elementary school which opened in 1932 as a 6-room K-6 school and has been expanded several times over the years.
  - Robert Famularo, principal
- Abraham Lincoln Elementary School, with 304 students in grades K-5, located at 325 Mason Avenue, was dedicated in 1953 on land purchased in 1950.
  - Patrick Lee, principal
- Sicomac Elementary School, with 297 students in grades PreK-5, located at 356 Sicomac Avenue, was completed in 1967.
  - Stephen Raimo, principal
- George Washington Elementary School with 346 students in grades K-5, located at 270 Woodland Avenue, was constructed as an 11-room brick building on the site where the previous school had burned down.
  - Scott Blake, principal

Middle school

- Dwight D. Eisenhower Middle School, with 672 students in grades 6–8, located at 344 Calvin Court, the school was approved in 1960 and dedicated in 1963.
  - Brian Faehndrich, principal

== Special education ==
Wyckoff is a member of the Northwest Bergen Council for Special Education Region 1, which includes 12 member districts which work together to provide special education services on a regional basis. Wyckoff is responsible for four of the special education classes in the Northwest Council. Special education classes are located in Sicomac School.

== Administration ==
Core members of the district's administration are:

- Kerry Postma, superintendent of schools
- Patricia Salvati, business administrator and board secretary

== Board of education ==
The district's board of education is comprised of nine members who set policy and oversee the fiscal and educational operation of the district through its administration. As a Type II school district, the board's trustees are elected directly by voters to serve three-year terms of office on a staggered basis, with three seats up for election each year held (since 2012) as part of the November general election. The board appoints a superintendent to oversee the district's day-to-day operations and a business administrator to supervise the business functions of the district.
