= A Night at the Opera (Queen album) =

Studio album by Queen
- Released: 21 November 1975
- Recorded: 27 October 1974 ("God Save the Queen"); 24 August – November 1975
- Studios: Trident (London); Olympic (London); Rockfield (Monmouthshire); Lansdowne (Kensington); Sarm East (London); Roundhouse (Camden, London); Scorpio Sound (Camden)
- Genres: Progressive rock; pop; heavy metal; hard rock; avant-pop; symphonic rock
- Length: 43:08
- Labels: EMI; Elektra
- Producers: Roy Thomas Baker; Queen

Queen chronology
Sheer Heart Attack (1974)	A Night at the Opera (1975)	A Day at the Races (1976)

Singles from A Night at the Opera
- 1. "Bohemian Rhapsody" Released: 31 October 1975; 2. "You're My Best Friend" Released: 18 June 1976

A Night at the Opera is the fourth studio album by the British rock band Queen, released on 21 November 1975, by EMI Records in the United Kingdom and Elektra Records in the United States. Produced by Roy Thomas Baker and Queen, it was reportedly the most expensive album ever recorded at the time of its release.

Named after the Marx Brothers' film of the same name, A Night at the Opera was recorded at various studios across a four-month period in 1975. Due to management issues, Queen had received almost none of the money they earned for their previous albums. Subsequently, they ended their contract with Trident Studios and did not use their studios for the album (the sole exception being "God Save the Queen", which had been recorded the previous year). They employed a complex production that extensively used multitrack recording, and the songs incorporated a wide range of styles, such as ballads, music hall, sea shanties, dixieland, hard rock and progressive rock influences. Aside from their usual equipment, Queen also utilised a diverse range of instruments such as a double bass, harp, ukulele and more.

Upon release, A Night at the Opera became Queen's first number-one album in the UK, topping the UK Albums Chart for four non-consecutive weeks. It peaked at number four on the US Billboard Top LPs & Tape chart and became the band's first Platinum-certified album in the US. It also produced the band's most successful single in the UK, "Bohemian Rhapsody", which became their first number-one song in the country. Despite being twice as long as the average length of singles during the 1970s, the song became immensely popular worldwide.

Contemporary reviews for A Night at the Opera were positive, with praise for its production and the diverse musical themes, and recognition as the album that established Queen as worldwide superstars. At the 19th Grammy Awards, "Bohemian Rhapsody" received Grammy Award nominations for Best Pop Vocal Performance by a Duo, Group or Chorus and Best Arrangement for Voices. It has since been hailed as Queen's best album, and one of the greatest albums of all time. In 2020, Rolling Stone ranked it number 128 on its list of the "500 Greatest Albums of All Time". It was inducted into the Grammy Hall of Fame in 2018.

== Background ==
"We had made hit records but we hadn't had any of the money back and if A Night at the Opera hadn't been a huge success I think we would have just disappeared under the ocean someplace. So we were making this album knowing it was live or die."

— Brian May, 1990

Queen's previous album, Sheer Heart Attack (1974), had obtained commercial success and brought the band mainstream attention, with the single "Killer Queen" reaching number two on the UK Singles Chart. The album was a minor hit in the US, reaching number twelve, while "Killer Queen" hit the top 20. Despite this success, the band was broke at the time, largely due to a contract they had signed which meant that they would produce albums for a production company, who would then sell the album to a record label. This meant that Queen saw almost none of the money they earned, as Trident Studios paid them £60 weekly. Guitarist Brian May was living in a bedsit in Earls Court, West London while frontman Freddie Mercury lived in a flat in Kensington that suffered from rising damp. The matter eventually reached a turning point when bassist John Deacon, who had recently married, was denied a cash advance of £4,000 by manager Norman Sheffield to put a deposit on a house. This increasing frustration led to Mercury writing the song "Death on Two Legs", which would serve as the opening track to A Night at the Opera.

In December 1974, the band hired Jim Beach as their lawyer and began negotiating their way out of Trident. (Note: In January 1975, while Queen were on the Sheer Heart Attack Tour, Don Arden, manager of Electric Light Orchestra, approached the band and offered to manage them. Although they declined, as they were still negotiating their way out of Trident, Arden approached Sheffield directly and presented him with his offer. Sheffield agreed; however, by the time Queen returned from their tour in May 1975, the deal was scrapped.) While Beach studied the group's contracts, the group continued touring. They began their first tour of Japan in April 1975, where thousands of fans met them at Haneda Airport and they played two sold out shows at the Nippon Budokan, Tokyo. After a nine-month dispute, Queen were finally free of Trident and signed directly with EMI Records in the UK and Elektra Records in North America. They regained control of their back catalogue, while their former publishing company, Feldman, was taken over by EMI. Because Trident had invested over £200,000 in promoting Queen, the group were required to pay half that to buy out their contracts, and they had to give Trident 1% royalties from their next six albums. Additionally, a tour of America scheduled for September 1975 had to be cancelled as it had been organised by Jack Nelson, who was associated with Trident, despite the already booked venues and sold tickets. This tour was necessary for regaining funds, and its cancellation was a major setback. (Note: As Taylor had noted in an interview several months prior: "We spent an awful lot of money on the last American tour and now we've been offered a good deal to go back and tour for about a month in August. We really must do it to replenish our funds. We simply can't afford not to, so the album won't be completed until after we get back.")

With funds running low, Queen immediately began searching for new management. Three names were shortlisted: Peter Rudge, Peter Grant, who was then Led Zeppelin's manager, and John Reid, who was Elton John's manager at the time. Rudge was on tour with the Rolling Stones and could not be reached, so they contacted Grant. Grant, who was eager to manage Queen, had intended the band would sign with Swan Song, Led Zeppelin's label, and suggested Queen go on tour while he sorted out their finances. The group feared Grant would prioritise Led Zeppelin over them, and were reluctant to sign with Swan Song, so they contacted Reid. Reid was initially doubtful about managing another band; however, he accepted after learning it was Queen, and advised the group to "go into the studio and make the best record you can".

== Recording and production ==
"I do enjoy the studio, yes. It's the most strenuous part of my career. It's so exhausting, mentally and physically. It drains you dry. I sometimes ask myself why I do it. After Sheer Heart Attack we were insane and said never again. And then look what happens!"

— Freddie Mercury

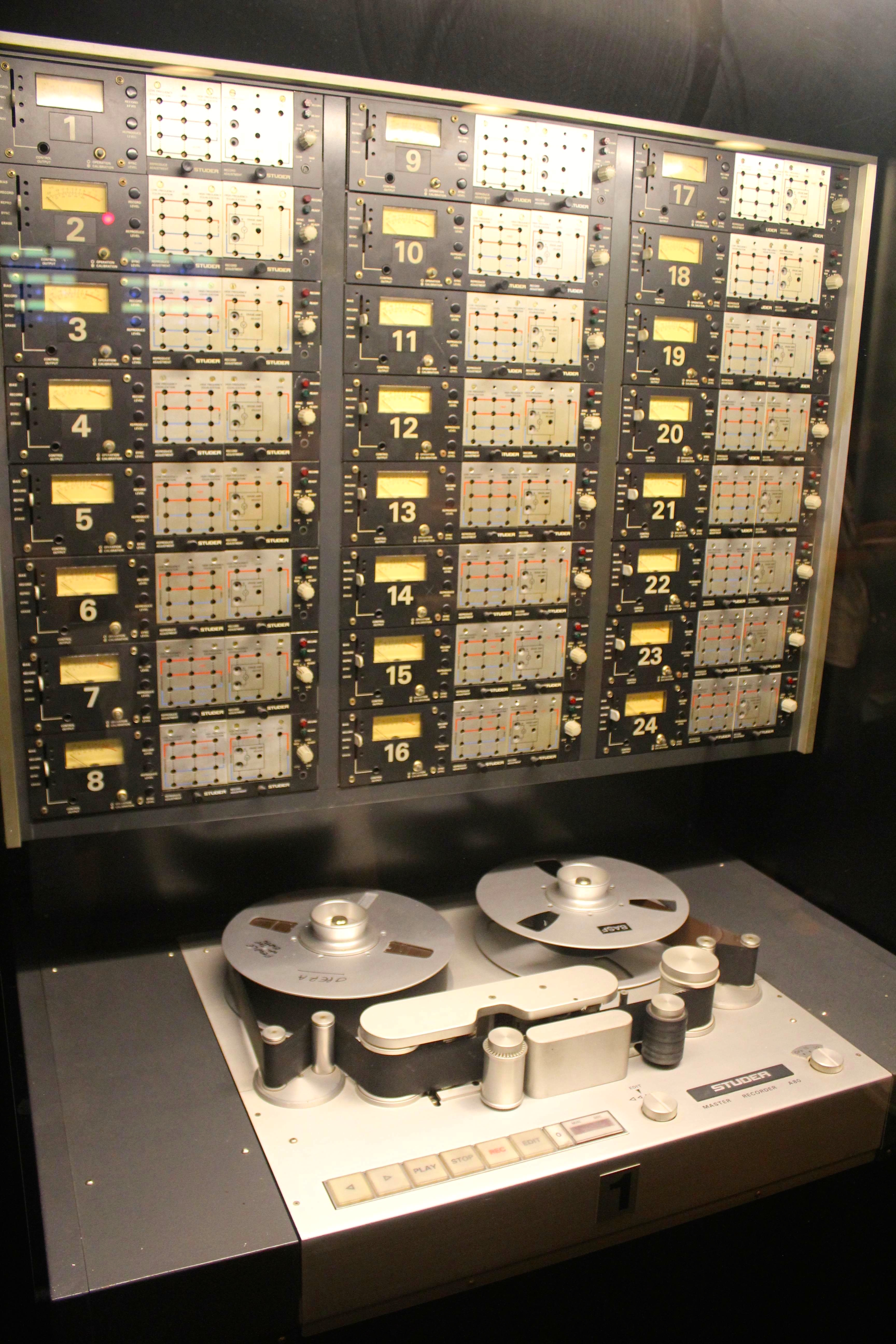
A Studer A80 24-track recorder

Queen worked with producer Roy Thomas Baker, who had also split from Trident, and engineer Mike Stone. It was the last time they would work with Baker until 1978's Jazz. Gary Langan, then 19 years old and who had been a tape operator on two of Sheer Heart Attack's songs, was promoted to an assistant engineer on the album. It was reportedly the most expensive album ever made at the time, with the estimated cost being £40,000 (equivalent to £310,700 in 2025).

The album was recorded at seven different studios over a period of four months. Queen spent a month during the summer of 1975 rehearsing in a barn at what would become Ridge Farm Studio in Surrey. The group then had a three-week writing and rehearsing session in a rented house near Kington, Herefordshire before recording began. (Note: The house was owned by novelist Tiffany Murray's mother; Murray later recalled the rehearsals in her memoirs Diamond Star Halo.) From August to September 1975, the group worked at Rockfield in Monmouthshire. For the remainder of recording sessions, which lasted until November, the group recorded at Lansdowne, Sarm Studios, Roundhouse, Scorpio Sound and Olympic Sound Studios. As their deal with Trident had ended, Trident Studios was not used during recording. The only song on the album recorded at Trident was "God Save the Queen", which had been recorded on 27 October the previous year, shortly before the band embarked on their Sheer Heart Attack Tour.

The group required multi-tracking for their complex vocal harmonies which typically consisted of May singing lower registers, Mercury singing middle registers and Taylor performing the higher parts (Deacon did not sing). Unlike their first three albums, which had used 16-track tape, A Night at the Opera was recorded using 24-track tape. Their vocal harmonies are particularly notable on the song "Bohemian Rhapsody", which features an elaborate opera sequence dominated by multitracked vocals. Similarly, "The Prophet's Song" has an a capella middle section that utilises delay on Mercury's vocals. For their self-titled "guitar orchestrations", May overdubbed his homemade Red Special guitar through an amplifier built by Deacon, known as the Deacy Amp, later released commercially as the "Brian May" amplifier by Vox. Guitar layering is one of May's distinctive techniques as a rock guitarist. He has said that the technique was developed whilst looking for a violin sound.

Aside from their usual equipment, the group used various instruments on the album. Mercury used a grand piano for most of the songs, contributing a jangle piano on "Seaside Rendezvous", while Taylor used a timpani and gong on "Bohemian Rhapsody". Deacon played double bass on "'39" and Wurlitzer Electric Piano on "You're My Best Friend". In the album liner notes, May was credited to "orchestral backdrops" – a reference to the fact that he played a number of instruments not typically found in Queen songs. He played an acoustic guitar on "Love of My Life" and "'39", as well a harp on "Love of My Life", and a toy koto on "The Prophet's Song". The song "Good Company" also features May recreating a Dixieland jazz band, which was done on his Red Special.

== Songs ==
=== Overview ===
The album has been affiliated with progressive rock, pop, heavy metal, hard rock, avant-pop and symphonic rock. It contains a diverse range of influences including folk, skiffle, British camp and music hall, jazz and opera. Each member wrote at least one song: Mercury wrote five of the songs, May wrote four, and Taylor and Deacon wrote one song each. The closing track was an instrumental cover of "God Save the Queen", the British national anthem, for which May was credited as the arranger.

For their first two albums, much of Queen's songwriting combined contemporary progressive rock and heavy metal, which led to a "Led Zeppelin meets Yes" description of the band. Starting with Sheer Heart Attack, Queen began drawing inspiration from their everyday lives, and embraced more mainstream musical styles, a trend which A Night at the Opera would continue. Lyrical themes ranged from science fiction and fantasy to heartbreak and romance, often with a tongue in cheek sense of humour. The Winnipeg Free Press noted that the group blended "clever, often poignant lyrics with attractively-arranged melodies".

=== Side one ===
==== "Death on Two Legs" ====
"Death on Two Legs" is considered to be Mercury's hate letter to Queen's first manager, Norman Sheffield, who for some years was reputed to have mistreated the band and abused his role as their manager from 1972 to 1975. The lyrics refer to "blood-sucking leeches" and "decaying sewer rats". Though the song never makes direct reference to him, after listening to a playback of the song at Trident Studios around the time of the album's release, Sheffield sued the band and the record label for defamation, which resulted in an out-of-court settlement, but also confirmed his connection to the song. Executives at EMI were unsure that the song was a good idea, May was unsure about the lyrics and felt bad that Mercury was singing it, but ultimately realised it was the songwriter's final choice as to what should be sung. As with "Bohemian Rhapsody", most of the guitar parts on this song were initially played on piano by Mercury, to demonstrate to May how they needed to be played on guitar. During live performances, Mercury would usually rededicate the song to "a real motherfucker of a gentleman", although this line was censored on the version that appeared on their Live Killers album in 1979. Other than on the live album, he said it was dedicated to a "motherfucker I used to know". "Death on Two Legs" remained on the setlist until, and well into, The Game Tour in 1981, and was then dropped. The piano introduction was played occasionally during the Hot Space and Works tours.

==== "Lazing on a Sunday Afternoon" ====
"Lazing on a Sunday Afternoon" is another song by Mercury. He played piano and performed all of the vocals. The lead vocal was sung in the studio and reproduced through headphones in a tin bucket elsewhere in the studio. A microphone picked up the sound from the bucket, which gives it a hollow "megaphone" sound. The guitar solo is also reported to have been recorded on the vocal track, as there were no more tracks to record on, as explained by producer Roy Thomas Baker during the Classic Albums documentary.

==== "I'm in Love with My Car" ====
"I'm in Love with My Car" was written and sung by Taylor. The song was initially taken as a joke by May, who thought that Taylor was not serious when he heard a demo recording. Taylor played the guitars in the original demo, but they were later re-recorded by May on his Red Special. The lead vocals were performed by Taylor on the studio version, and all released live versions. The revving sounds at the conclusion of the song were recorded by Taylor's then current car, an Alfa Romeo. The lyrics were inspired by one of the band's roadies, Johnathan Harris, whose Triumph TR4 was evidently the "love of his life". The song is dedicated to him, with the album saying: "Dedicated to Johnathan Harris, boy racer to the end". When it came down to releasing the album's first single, Taylor was so fond of his song that he urged Mercury, the writer of the first single, "Bohemian Rhapsody", to allow it to be the B-side. This decision would later become the cause of much internal friction in the band, in that while it was only the B-side, it generated an equal amount of publishing royalties for Taylor as the A-side did for Mercury. The song was often played live during the 1977–1981 period. Taylor sang it from the drums while Mercury played piano and provided backing vocals. It was played in the Queen + Paul Rodgers Tour in 2005 and the Rock the Cosmos Tour in 2008. Taylor would again play the song for his concerts with the Cross and solo tours, where instead of drums he played rhythm guitar.

==== "You're My Best Friend" ====
"You're My Best Friend" was the second song and first Queen single to be written by John Deacon. He composed it while he was learning to play piano, and played the Wurlitzer electric piano (which Mercury disliked) on the recording and overdubbed the bass guitar afterwards. The song was written for his wife, Veronica. It was released as the album's second single after "Bohemian Rhapsody" and was also a top 10 hit in the UK, reaching number 7.

==== "'39" ====
"'39" was May's attempt to do a 'lover's pirate shanty.' It relates the tale of a group of space explorers who embark on what is, from their perspective, a year-long voyage. Upon their return, however, they realise that a hundred years have passed, because of the time dilation effect in Einstein's theory of relativity, and the loved ones they left behind are now all dead or aged. May sings the song on the album, with backing vocals by Mercury and Taylor. During live performances, Mercury sang the lead vocal. May had asked Deacon to play double bass as a joke but a couple of days later he found Deacon in the studio with the instrument, and he had already learned to play it. George Michael performed "'39" at the Freddie Mercury Tribute Concert on 20 April 1992. Michael cited this song as his favourite Queen song, claiming he used to busk it on the London Underground. Recently, Queen have included the song on the setlists of their recent tours with Adam Lambert and before Lambert with Paul Rodgers; for all these tours since 2005 it is sung, as it is on the album, by May.

==== "Sweet Lady" ====
"Sweet Lady" is a fast rocker written by May. The song is an unusual rock style in 3/4 meter (which gives way to 4/4 at the bridge).

==== "Seaside Rendezvous" ====
"Seaside Rendezvous", written by Mercury, has a mock-instrumental bridge section which begins at around 0:51 into the song. The section is performed entirely by Mercury and Taylor using their voices alone. Mercury imitates woodwind instruments including a clarinet and Taylor mostly brass instruments, including tubas and trumpets, and even a kazoo; during this section Taylor hits the highest note on the album, C6. The "tap dance" segment is performed by Mercury and Taylor on the mixing desk with thimbles on their fingers. Mercury plays both grand piano and jangle honky-tonk.

=== Side two ===
==== "The Prophet's Song" ====
"The Prophet's Song" was composed by May. He explained that he wrote the song after a dream he had had about The Great Flood and his fears about the human race and its general lack of empathy. He spent several days assembling the song, and it includes a vocal canon sung by Mercury. The vocal, and later instrumental canon was produced by early tape delay devices. Over eight minutes long, it is also Queen's longest studio song. The speed-up effect that happens in the middle of the guitar solo was achieved by starting a reel-to-reel player with the tape on it, as the original tape player was stopped.

==== "Love of My Life" ====
"Love of My Life" is one of Queen's most covered songs (there have been versions by many acts like Extreme featuring May, Scorpions and Elaine Paige). Mercury played piano (including a classical solo) and sang all vocals, including multi-tracked harmonies. May played harp (doing it chord by chord and pasting the takes to form the entire part), Gibson Hummingbird acoustic guitar (which he had bought in Japan) and his Red Special. May eventually arranged the song so it could be played on an acoustic 12 string for live performances. "Love of My Life" was such a concert favourite that Mercury frequently stopped singing and allowed the audience to take over. It was especially well received during concerts in South America, and the band released the song as a single there. When Queen and Paul Rodgers performed the song (specifically Brian solo) he sang almost none of the words and let the audience sing it all, continuing the tradition. When Queen and Adam Lambert performed it, Brian would play along to a projection of Freddie singing. When they performed with Paul Rodgers during 2004–2008, Mercury was also projected during the show, but not in a round display as they use with Adam Lambert.

==== "Good Company" ====
"Good Company" was written and sung by May, who sings all vocals and plays ukulele. The recording features a recreation of a Dixieland-style jazz band using May's Red Special guitar and Deacy Amp. May composed the song on his father's banjo ukulele, but recorded the song with a regular ukulele. Mercury was not involved with the song's recording, making it one of the few Queen songs not to feature their lead singer.

==== "Bohemian Rhapsody" ====
Photo of Queen taken from the photo sessions of their second album, which would inspire the look of the promotional film for "Bohemian Rhapsody"

"Bohemian Rhapsody" was written by Mercury with the first guitar solo composed by May. All piano, bass and drum parts, as well as the vocal arrangements, were thought up by Mercury on a daily basis and written down "in blocks" (using note names instead of sheets) on a phonebook. During the recording, the song became affectionately known as "Fred's Thing" to the band, and the title only emerged during the final sessions. The other members recorded their respective instruments with no concept of how their tracks would be utilised in the final mix.

The operatic section was originally intended to be only a short interlude of "Galileos" that connected the ballad and hard rock portions of the song. The interlude is full of "obscure classical characters: Scaramouche, a clown from the Commedia dell'arte; astronomer Galileo; Figaro, the principal character in Beaumarchais' The Barber of Seville and The Marriage of Figaro; and Beelzebub, identified in the Christian New Testament as Satan, Prince of Demons, but in Arabic as "Lord of the Flies". Also in Arabic the word Bismillah', which is a noun from a phrase in the Qur'an; "Bismi-llahi r-rahmani r-rahiim", meaning "In the name of God, most gracious, most merciful".

Despite being twice as long as the average single in 1975 and garnering mixed critical reviews initially, the song became immensely popular, topping charts worldwide (where it remained for a then unprecedented nine weeks in the UK) and is widely regarded as one of the greatest songs in music history. The song was rereleased as a double A-side to "These Are the Days of Our Lives" on 5 September 1991, Mercury's 45th birthday, in the US and on 9 December 1991, after Mercury's death, in the UK.

==== "God Save the Queen" ====
May recorded a version of "God Save the Queen", the British national anthem, on 27 October 1974 at Trident Studios before their Sheer Heart Attack tour. He played a guide piano which was edited out later and added several layers of guitars. After the song was completed it was played as a coda at virtually every Queen concert. When recording the track May played a rough version on piano for Roy Thomas Baker, producer, and Mike Stone, engineer. He called his own skills on the piano sub-par at the time. He performed the song live on the roof of Buckingham Palace for the Queen's Golden Jubilee in 2002. May has stated that he performed the song on the roof of Buckingham Palace as a homage to Jimi Hendrix's version of "The Star-Spangled Banner".

== Release ==
Queen performing live during their 1975 "A Night at the Opera" tour

The album title was inspired by the Marx Brothers film of the same name, which the band had watched during recording sessions. Subsequently, they became good friends with the film's star Groucho Marx, to the point where Marx sent the band a letter praising their 1976 album A Day at the Races. Marx also invited Queen to visit him at his Los Angeles home in March 1977 (five months before he died). The band thanked him, and performed "'39" a cappella. The cover artwork features the band's logo, which was designed by Mercury, on a white background. The band's next album, A Day at the Races, featured a similar design but on a black background.

"Bohemian Rhapsody" was released as the lead single on 31 October 1975, with "I'm in Love with My Car" as its B-side. Their management initially refused to release it; however, Kenny Everett played a copy of the song on his show 14 times, at which point audience demand for the song intensified and the band's label EMI was forced to release it. It subsequently topped the UK charts for nine weeks and peaked at number nine in the US. A second single, "You're My Best Friend" was released on 18 June 1976, with "'39" as its B-side. It reached number sixteen in the US and number seven in the UK.

The album was completed a week before the group were to embark on their A Night at the Opera Tour in support of the album. This resulted in a 36-hour mixing session, as the group wanted to have time to rehearse their setlist before touring. Due to time constraints, the group only had three and a half days to rehearse, at Elstree Studios, with four hours taken off to shoot the music video for "Bohemian Rhapsody". The tour spanned 1975 and 1976, and covered the UK, the US, Japan, and Australia.

=== Re-releases ===
The album was first re-released in the U.S. by Hollywood Records on 3 September 1991 with two bonus remixes, as part of a complete re-release of all Queen albums.

On 30 April 2002, the album was again re-released on DVD-Audio with a 96 kHz/24bit Linear PCM stereo mix and a 5.1-channel mix in DTS 96/24 surround sound for standard DVD-Video players and 96 kHz/24bit MLP surround sound for DVD-Audio capable machines. It also includes the original 1975 video of Bohemian Rhapsody.

On 21 November 2005, it was once more re-released by Hollywood Records Catalogue Number 2061-62572-2 to celebrate the 30th anniversary of the album and its first single, "Bohemian Rhapsody". This release is accompanied by a DVD-Video disc with the same track listing featuring the original videos, old and new concert footage (including "'39" from the Queen + Paul Rodgers tour and Brian May on the roof of Buckingham Palace playing "God Save the Queen") and audio commentary by all four band members.

On 8 November 2010, record company Universal Music announced a remastered and expanded reissue of the album set for release in May 2011. This as part of a new record deal between Queen and Universal Music, which meant Queen's association with EMI Records came to an end after almost 40 years. According to Universal Music, all Queen albums were to be remastered and reissued in 2011. By September 2012 the reissue program was completed. Along with this came a 5.1 channel release of the album on Blu-ray Audio.

== Reception ==
=== Contemporary critical reaction ===
A Night at the Opera received very positive reviews in the UK music magazines, although some of them had to review the album without preview copies because the band were mixing the album until the last moment. Tony Stewart of NME opined that "More than anything else, A Night at the Opera is a consolidation of the previous album's success in skilfully engineering this balance between artistry and effectology. Throughout the album, they display their individual songwriting abilities and musicianship to devastating effect." Stewart described "Sweet Lady" as an "awful rock number" which "mars an otherwise excellent set", and concluded, "If it's the most expensive album ever made in a British studio, it's also arguably the best." In Melody Maker, Harry Doherty called the album "easily their best work to date" and wrote that the band had "used studio gadgetry to the fullest effect, but they've also used it to the best advantage". He stated that "Queen could well set out a future direction in British rock and roll. They're hard rock, but just commercial enough to capture a massive, wide-ranging audience." Doherty's conclusion was that A Night at the Opera was "with Roxy Music's Siren the best rock album I've heard this year".

In Record Mirror & Disc, Ray Fox-Cumming attempted to review the album based on a single listening at the playback party held for the press, which he admitted "isn't really enough" to form a proper critical opinion. However, he described his first impressions of "an amazing rush of music with one track running helter-skelter into the next ... The orchestral effects, all done by voices, are dazzling but come and go too quickly to appreciate on a solo listening." Fox-Cumming stated that the album had three highlights – "Death on Two Legs", "The Prophet's Song" and "Bohemian Rhapsody" – and only one bad track, "Sweet Lady". He concluded that "as a whole, A Night at the Opera is faster, flashier and more complex than Sheer Heart Attack, but they haven't gone over the top". Phil Sutcliffe of Sounds reviewed the album from a cassette copy, and gave it a five-star review: "You can feel the colossal effort that went into every second of this long album – and yet there's a hardly a moment when I would criticise it for being contrived or overproduced." He singled out "Bohemian Rhapsody" and "The Prophet's Song" as the two tracks that "make a good album extraordinary", despite stating that the latter song's lyrics were "not appealing", and overall highlighting the album's "musical range power and consistently incisive lyrics".

In the US, Kris Nicholson of Rolling Stone said that although they share other heavy metal groups' penchant for "manipulating dynamics", Queen are an elite act in the genre and set themselves apart by incorporating "unlikely effects: acoustic piano, harp, a capella vocals, no synthesisers. Coupled with good songs." Robert Christgau, writing in The Village Voice, felt that the album "doesn't actually botch any of a half-dozen arty-to-heavy 'eclectic' modes ... and achieves a parodic tone often enough to suggest more than meets the ear. Maybe if they come up with a coherent masterwork I'll figure out what that more is." The Winnipeg Free Press wrote: "The group's potential is practically limitless, indicating that Queen is destined to finally take its place among the small handful of truly major acts working in rock today."

=== Legacy ===
Retrospective professional reviews
Review scores
Source	Rating
AllMusic	5/5 stars
Chicago Tribune	3/4 stars
Christgau's Record Guide	B−
Encyclopedia of Popular Music	4/5 stars
MusicHound Rock	4.5/5
Pitchfork	8.9/10
PopMatters	9/10
Q	5/5 stars
The Rolling Stone Album Guide	3.5/5 stars
Uncut	5/5 stars

In a retrospective review for AllMusic, Stephen Thomas Erlewine called the album "a self-consciously ridiculous and overblown hard rock masterpiece" and "prog rock with a sense of humour as well as dynamics". Erlewine felt that Queen "never bettered their approach anywhere else". Progressive rock historian Stephen Lambe has disputed that the album itself is progressive rock in his book Citizens of Hope and Glory: The Story of Progressive Rock. He wrote: "While far from progressive rock, it was the band's most grandiose and ambitious album yet, full of great songwriting and prog influences." He said the album was "a neat symbol of the furthest reach of the progressive rock movement".

Reviewing the album's reissue in 2002, Mojo called it "an imperial extravaganza, a cornucopia", and Queen "a band of hungrily competitive individualists on a big roll of friendship and delight". Writing for the Chicago Tribune, Greg Kot gave the album a very positive rating, stating how he believed that alongside A Day at the Races, A Night at the Opera was when "the band hit its artistic peak, with sterling contributions from all four band members".

In 2004, Jason Warburg of the Daily Vault stated that the album "absolutely blew me away" and that "A Night at the Opera was the disc that would catapult Queen from British hitmakers to global superstars. As with many such landmark albums it became part milestone and part millstone, with every album that followed compared in some way or another to the musical and commercial success they achieved here. Be that as it may, the music is what counts – and it is simply amazing." Grooves noted that "Sharp operatic interludes, abrupt rhythmic changes, A Night at the Opera defies convention and places Queen in that rarefied circle of genuine superstars."

In a 2006 review, Paul Rees of Q observed that although A Night at the Opera was "released the same year as both Bowie's arch soul pastiche Young Americans and the sleek art rock of Roxy's Siren, it has rarely been heralded as either. Yet it was, and is, every bit as brash, bold and full of the joys of its own possibilities." Feeling that Queen "never came close to bettering their fourth album", Rees concluded that "later albums would expose the lack of soul at the heart of Queen's music; they were all surface, no feeling. They elected themselves the great entertainers, and this heady rush of experimentation was not to be repeated. But A Night at the Opera remains glorious, monumental. It is British rock's greatest extravagance." In 2007, Chris Jones of BBC Music noted the diverse range of musical styles on the album, saying, "Sheer Heart Attack had hinted at a working knowledge of 19th century parlour balladry, 20s ragtime and Jimi Hendrix. A Night at the Opera was to add opera, trad jazz, heavy metal and more to the mix." He concluded that the album "remains their finest hour".

In 2011, digitally remastered versions of the earlier Queen albums were released, prompting another batch of reviews. Uncut said that the album "proved there was no limit to their capabilities" and concluded, "Containing not one but two monumental epics ('Bohemian Rhapsody', 'The Prophet's Song'), and gorging on grandiose gestures galore, A Night at the Opera secured itself instant classic status". Pitchfork's Dominique Leone stated, "No punches pulled, no expense spared: A Night at the Opera was Queen at the top of the mountain". AJ Ramirez of PopMatters wrote, "Kicking off with the downright ominous high-drama of 'Death on Two Legs' (a retort against the group's recently deposed management where Mercury spits out venomous invectives at the targets of his ire), the album gives way to a kaleidoscope of styles, from 1920 jazz to space-folk narratives to top-of-the-line contemporary pop-rock. Amazingly, while the transitions between genres would conceivably throw listeners for a loop, none are jarring. Instead, Queen succeeds because it pulls from all the best tricks in the library of showbiz history to deliver laughs, heartache, grandeur, and spectacle to its audience at precisely the right moments." He observed that "it is the realization of such a unique sonic vision that pushes [the album] into the realm of true excellence ... A Night at the Opera stands as a breathtaking, involving creation, and unequivocally Queen's finest album."

=== Accolades ===
In 1977, "Bohemian Rhapsody" received two Grammy Award nominations for Best Pop Vocal Performance by a Duo, Group or Chorus and Best Arrangement for Voices.

In 2003, Rolling Stone magazine ranked it at number 230 on its 500 Greatest Albums of All Time list, number 231 on its 2012 list, and number 128 on its 2020 list.

Publication	Country	Accolade	Year	Rank
1001 Albums You Must Hear Before You Die	US	1001 Albums You Must Hear Before You Die	2005	*
ABC	AUS	Poll: Top 100 Albums	2007	28
BBC	UK	Poll: Top 100 Albums	2006	9
Channel 4	UK	Poll: Greatest 100 Albums	2005	13
Classic Rock	UK	The 100 Greatest Rock Albums Ever	2001	25
Classic Rock	UK	The 100 Greatest British Rock Albums Ever	2006	17
Classic Rock	UK	The 200 Greatest Albums of the 70's (20 greatest of 1975)	2006	*
Classic Rock	UK	The 50 Best Rock Albums Ever	2018	6
Kerrang!	UK	Poll: The 100 Best British Rock Albums Ever	2005	19
NME/British Hit Singles & Albums	UK	Readers poll: 100 Greatest Albums of All Time	2006	19
Q	UK	The 50 Best British Albums Ever	2004	17
Rolling Stone	MX	Poll: The 100 Greatest Albums of All Time	2004	11
Rolling Stone	US	Poll: Readers' Top 100 Albums	2002	82
Rolling Stone	US	500 Greatest Albums of All Time	2020	128
Virgin	UK	Poll: All Time Top 1000 Albums	1998	87

(*) designates unordered lists.

=== Band comments ===
"I did discipline myself... Take vocals, because they're my forté [sic] – especially harmonies and those kind of things. On Queen II we've gone berserk. But on this album I consciously restricted myself. That's brought the songwriting side of it across, and I think those are some of the strongest songs we've ever written."

— Freddie Mercury

"It has a couple of the heaviest things we've ever done and probably some of the lightest things as well. It is probably closer to Sheer Heart Attack than the others in that it does dart around and create lots of different moods, but we worked on it in the same way we worked on Queen II. A lot of it is very intense and very ... layered."

— Brian May

== Track listing ==
=== Original release ===
All lead vocals by Freddie Mercury except where noted.

Side one
No.	Title	Writer(s)	Lead vocals	Length
1.	"Death on Two Legs"	Freddie Mercury		3:43
2.	"Lazing on a Sunday Afternoon"	Mercury		1:08
3.	"I'm in Love with My Car"	Roger Taylor	Roger Taylor	3:05
4.	"You're My Best Friend"	John Deacon		2:50
5.	"'39"	Brian May	Brian May	3:30
6.	"Sweet Lady"	May		4:01
7.	"Seaside Rendezvous"	Mercury		2:13
Total length:				20:30

Side two
No.	Title	Writer(s)	Lead vocals	Length
8.	"The Prophet's Song"	May		8:21
9.	"Love of My Life"	Mercury		3:38
10.	"Good Company"	May	May	3:26
11.	"Bohemian Rhapsody"	Mercury		5:55
12.	"God Save the Queen" (instrumental)	Traditional; arranged by May		1:11
Total length:				22:31 43:08

- On the cassette, the positions of "Seaside Rendezvous" and "Good Company" were swapped to maintain a similar duration for each side.

Bonus tracks (1991 Hollywood Records reissue)
No.	Title	Length
13.	"I'm in Love with My Car" (1991 bonus remix)	3:28
14.	"You're My Best Friend" (1991 bonus remix)	2:54
Total length:		49:40

=== Universal Music reissue (2011) ===
Bonus EP
No.	Title	Writer(s)	Length
1.	"Keep Yourself Alive" (long-lost retake, June 1975)	May	4:05
2.	"Bohemian Rhapsody" (Operatic Section A Cappella Mix 2011)	Mercury	1:05
3.	"You're My Best Friend" (backing track mix 2011)	Deacon	2:58
4.	"I'm in Love with My Car" (guitar & vocal mix 2011)	Taylor	3:21
5.	"'39" (Live at Earl's Court, 7 June 1977)	May	3:47
6.	"Love Of My Life" (South American live single, June 1979; somewhat misleading credit, as this single from Live Killers, recorded at Festhalle Frankfurt on 2 February 1979, topped the South American charts over a year after Queen played there in 1981)	Mercury	3:44
Total length:			19:00

=== iTunes deluxe edition (2011) ===
Bonus videos
No.	Title	Length
1.	"Bohemian Rhapsody" (no flames original version)
2.	"Seaside Rendezvous" (30th anniversary 2005)
3.	"Love of My Life" (live at Milton Keynes '82)

== Personnel ==
Track numbering refers to CD and digital releases of the album.

Queen

- Freddie Mercury – lead vocals (1, 2, 4, 6–9, 11), backing vocals (1–9, 11), Bösendorfer piano (1–3, 7, 9, 11), jangle piano (7)
- Brian May – electric guitar (all but 7), backing vocals (1, 3–6, 8, 10, 11), acoustic guitar (5, 8, 9), lead vocals (5, 10), koto (8), harp (9), ukulele (10)
- Roger Taylor – drums (1–4, 6–11), backing vocals (1, 3–8, 11), percussion (2, 5, 7, 9, 11, 12), lead vocals and additional electric guitar (3)
- John Deacon – bass guitar (1–4, 6–11), electric piano (4), double bass (1, 5)

Production

- Roy Thomas Baker – production
- Mike Stone – engineering
- Gary Lyons – engineering
- John Harris – equipment supervision
- David Costa – art direction

== Charts ==
=== Weekly charts ===
Chart (1975–1977)	Peak position
Australian Albums (Kent Music Report)	1
Austrian Albums (Ö3 Austria)	9
Canada Top Albums/CDs (RPM)	2
Dutch Albums (Album Top 100)	1
Finnish Albums (The Official Finnish Charts)	1
French Albums (SNEP)	16
German Albums (Offizielle Top 100)	5
Japanese Albums (Oricon)	9
New Zealand Albums (RMNZ)	1
Norwegian Albums (VG-lista)	4
Swedish Albums (Sverigetopplistan)	10
UK Albums (Official Charts)	1
US Billboard 200	4

Chart (2007)	Peak position
Japanese Albums (Oricon)	67
Portuguese Albums (AFP)	23

Chart (2011–2012)	Peak position
Belgian Albums (Ultratop Flanders)	96
Spanish Albums (Promusicae)	55

Chart (2018–2019)	Peak position
Belgian Albums (Ultratop Wallonia)	59
Irish Albums (IRMA)	86
Italian Albums (FIMI)	33
Scottish Albums (Official Charts)	32
Swiss Albums (Schweizer Hitparade)	69
US Top Rock Albums (Billboard)	41

Chart (2025–2026)	Peak position
German Rock & Metal Albums (Offizielle Top 100)	13
Greek Albums (IFPI)	60

=== Year-end charts ===
Chart (1976)	Peak position
Australian Albums (Kent Music Report)	4
Canada Top Albums/CDs (RPM)	15
French Albums (SNEP)	88
Japanese Albums (Oricon)	22
UK Albums (OCC)	12
US Billboard 200	8

== Certifications ==
Region	Certification	Certified units/sales
Australia (ARIA)	2× Platinum	100,000^{^}
Argentina (CAPIF)	Platinum	60,000^{^}
Argentina (CAPIF) Hollywood Records release	Platinum	60,000^{^}
Austria (IFPI Austria)	Gold	25,000^{*}
Belgium (BRMA)	Gold	25,000^{*}
Canada (Music Canada)	3× Platinum	300,000^{^}
Denmark (IFPI Danmark) original release	Gold	30,000
Denmark (IFPI Danmark) re-release	Platinum	20,000^{‡}
Finland (Musiikkituottajat)	Gold	20,000
Germany (BVMI)	Platinum	500,000^{^}
Italy (FIMI) sales since 2009	Platinum	50,000^{‡}
Japan (RIAJ)	Platinum	250,000^{^}
New Zealand (RMNZ)	2× Platinum	30,000^{^}
Netherlands (NVPI)	2× Platinum	200,000^{^}
Poland (ZPAV) 2008 Agora SA album reissue	2× Platinum	40,000^{*}
South Africa (RISA)	Gold	25,000^{*}
Spain (Promusicae)	Gold	50,000^{^}
United Kingdom (BPI)	Platinum	300,000^{^}
United States (RIAA)	3× Platinum	3,000,000^{^}
^{*} Sales figures based on certification alone.^{^} Shipments figures based on certification alone.^{‡} Sales+streaming figures based on certification alone.

== Bibliography ==
- Blake, Mark (2010). Is This The Real Life? The Untold Story of Queen. Arum Press. ISBN 978-1-84513-713-7.
- Chapman, Phil (2017). The Dead Straight Guide to Queen. This Day In Music Books. ISBN 978-1-787-59050-2.
- Dean, Ken (1986). Queen : A Visual Documentary. Omnibus Press. ISBN 978-0-7119-0857-4.
- Hodkinson, Mark (2004). Queen : The Early Years. Omnibus Press. ISBN 1-84449-012-2.
- Purvis, George (2007). Queen: Complete Works. London: Titan Group Publishing. ISBN 978-0-857-68551-3.
- Jones, Lesley-Ann (2011). Freddie Mercury. London: Hodder & Stoughton. ISBN 978-1-44473-368-6.
