= Norman Sheffield =

British music manager (1939–2014)

Sheffield in 2013

Norman Sheffield (25 September 1939 – 20 June 2014) was a music and advertising industry figure, most noted for his music industry recording and management roles, ownership of the former Trident Studios, and being the original manager of the rock band Queen.

== Early life ==
Sheffield was born in Enfield, the son of Walter Sheffield, a panel beater. He was educated at Albany Boys School.

== Music life ==
Sheffield enjoyed moderate chart success as a drummer in the Hunters, as well as starring as the drummer with Cliff Richard in a television performance at the London Palladium in 1958. More recently, one of the Hunters' biggest hits, "Teen Scene", featured on the soundtrack to the 2009 film An Education.

Sheffield later started a record shop with his wife, in Waltham Cross, Hertfordshire, converting the upstairs into a recording studio which proved popular with local musicians wanting to record their own music. When the shop was sold while he searched for larger premises in London, much of the original equipment was purchased by Chris Blackwell, the future founder of Island Records.

== Trident Studios ==
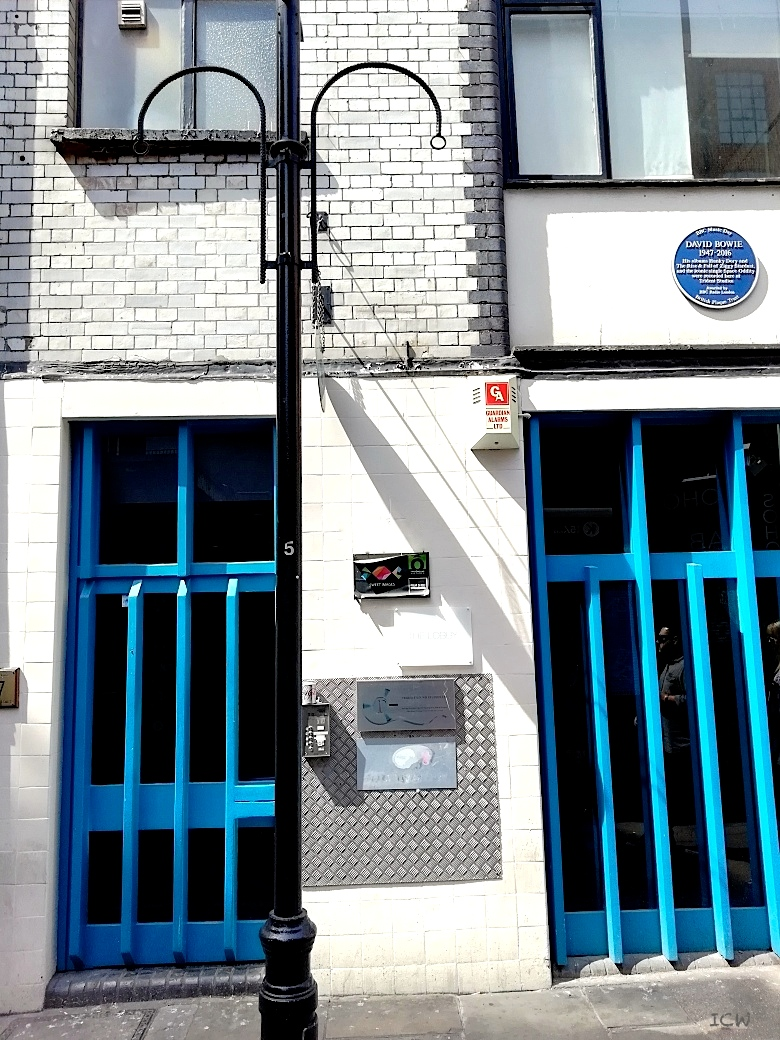
The former Trident Studios building at St Anne's Court, Soho, London, 2018, with the David Bowie Blue Plaque

Sheffield went on to launch Trident Studios in 1968 with his brother Barry, turning a disused engraving works in St Anne's Court, in the Soho area of London, into one of the leading recording studios in the world. "My Name Is Jack" by Manfred Mann was recorded at Trident in March 1968, and helped launch the studio's reputation. Later that year, the Beatles recorded their song "Hey Jude" there and part of their self-titled double album (also known as the "White Album"). Other well-known albums and songs recorded at Trident include Elton John's "Candle in the Wind", David Bowie's "Life on Mars", "Changes" and The Rise and Fall of Ziggy Stardust, and Queen's albums Queen, Queen II and Sheer Heart Attack.

From 1972 to 1975, Sheffield, under one of his companies within the Trident Group, was also the original manager of the British rock band Queen, as well as other acts. Trident invested heavily in the band while the name of the band provoked shock and proved difficult to promote, and therefore played a major role in breaking them into the mainstream by helping them obtain a contract with EMI Records.

The song "Death on Two Legs" was written by Freddie Mercury about the band's falling out with Sheffield. Though the song makes no direct reference to him, Sheffield sued both the band and the record label for defamation. This resulted in an out-of-court settlement, thus revealing to the public his connection with the song. Sheffield denied that he had mistreated the band in his capacity as manager, and cited the original 1972 management contracts between himself and Queen in his autobiography published in 2013, Life on Two Legs: Set The Record Straight, in his defence.

Shortly after Sheffield's death in June 2014, Brian May posted a tribute to him on his personal blog.

== "Bohemian Rhapsody" ==
Even after the split with Queen, one of Sheffield's other companies, Trilion Video was contracted by the band in 1975 to produce the music video for Queen's song "Bohemian Rhapsody", which has been regarded as the first modern music video.

== Life on Two Legs ==
Life on Two Legs by Norman J Sheffield

In 2013, under a publishing deal with Amazon, Sheffield released his personal memoirs titled Life on Two Legs: Set The Record Straight, with his inside story of the beginnings and growth of Trident Studios, and its role in recording the music that made it famous worldwide. It also details how Queen were "discovered" and managed by him and Trident, and the lead-up to Freddie Mercury writing "Death on Two Legs (Dedicated to...)" (The "dedicated to..." being him) about the acrimonious split with Sheffield and Trident.

The press release and website promised exclusive photos and untold stories about the artists who recorded at Trident, as well as copies of the original Queen management contracts from 1972. The book has a foreword by Paul McCartney.

== Other business ==
With the growth of electronic music and home studios in the 1980s, the music industry began to change and Sheffield sold the studio. He founded one of the first Apple Computer dealerships in the UK, importing early Apple computers from the United States in 1986, complete with step-down transformers which enabled the machines to operate on UK voltage. The company also opened specially designed offices, known as a bureaus, to allow Apple and PC users to scan, print and use the Apple computers on a per-hour basis.

Together with three of his sons founded the advertising agency Tableau, using his knowledge of the entertainment industry and experience from early desktop publishing. The agency was responsible for the early EasyJet airline advertising campaigns and their first online booking system, and held other notable advertising accounts and went on to gain awards within the industry for its work.

Prior to his death, Sheffield together with two of his sons and a former sound engineer from Trident Studios continued to work within the music industry and assisted in the development of a mobile music app named "Trackd" which allows musicians to record collaboratively directly on a mobile device using an 8-Track mixer and also allows the apps' musicians to promote their music to a worldwide using the app platform promoted through app stores. The App has been downloaded over a quarter of a million times to date and won awards for its innovation to music technology.

== Death ==
Sheffield died during retirement in Cornwall on 20 June 2014 aged 74. He had suffered from throat cancer.
