= Good Old-Fashioned Lover Boy =

1976 song from the band Queen

Song by Queen

from the album A Day at the Races and the EP Queen's First E.P.
- A-side: "Teo Torriatte" (Japan)
- Released: 20 May 1977
- Recorded: 1976
- Genre: Glam rock; music hall; pop rock
- Length: 2:54
- Label: EMI
- Songwriter: Freddie Mercury
- Producer: Queen

Queen singles chronology
"Teo Torriatte (Let Us Cling Together)" (1977)	"Good Old-Fashioned Lover Boy" (1977)	"Long Away" (1977)

Music video
- "Good Old-Fashioned Lover Boy" on YouTube

"Good Old-Fashioned Lover Boy" is the eighth track from the British rock band Queen's 1976 album A Day at the Races, written by Freddie Mercury. It was one of several British music hall-inspired songs composed by members of the band. It reached number 17 on the UK Singles Chart as the lead track from Queen's First E.P.

== Background and composition ==
The song begins with a piano and vocal introduction by Mercury, then continues, with the bass and drums adding on, at the start of the chorus. The second verse is sung, followed by another chorus. At this point, the drums, bass and guitar drop out, which then leads into the bridge, sung by Mercury and Mike Stone ("Hey boy where'd you get it from, hey boy where did you go?"). Following the Brian May guitar solo, another verse is sung, and then the chorus ends the track.

The song describes how "a good old-fashioned lover boy" is looking forward to a night of revelry and romance.

== Live performances and other appearances ==
It was partially mimed by the band for the BBC and aired on Top of the Pops. The Top of the Pops version also has drummer Roger Taylor singing Mike Stone's line.

The song was also performed live from A Day at the Races Tour until the end of the News of the World Tour. It was performed in a medley after "Killer Queen", and was the first two verses, followed by the final chorus.

== Personnel ==
- Freddie Mercury – lead and backing vocals, piano
- Brian May – guitars, backing vocals
- Roger Taylor – drums, triangle, woodblocks, backing vocals
- John Deacon – bass
- Mike Stone – additional vocals

== Certifications ==
Region	Certification	Certified units/sales
New Zealand (RMNZ)	Gold	15,000^{‡}
United Kingdom (BPI)	Gold	400,000^{‡}
United States (RIAA)	Gold	500,000^{‡}
^{‡} Sales+streaming figures based on certification alone.
