= Constantine (album) =

Studio album by Constantine Maroulis
- Released: August 7, 2007
- Genre: Rock
- Length: 43:37
- Label: 6th Place Records
- Producers: Mark Copely, Jim Boggia

Professional ratings
Review scores
Source	Rating
AllMusic	4/5 stars

Constantine is the solo debut album of rock singer Constantine Maroulis. It debuted at number 75 on the Billboard 200, selling around 9,000 copies in its first week.

== Track listing ==
1. "Girl Like You"
2. "Several Thousand"
3. "Everybody Loves"
4. "Child, You're the Revolution"
5. "Right To My Head"
6. "Favorite T-Shirt"
7. "Sister, Sister"
8. "Fading Into You"
9. "I Thought It Was Something"
10. "So Long"
11. "Heaven Help The Lonely"
12. "Midnight Radio"

== Billboard chart sales ==
Sales
25,000
