= Death on Two Legs =

"Death on Two Legs (Dedicated to...)"
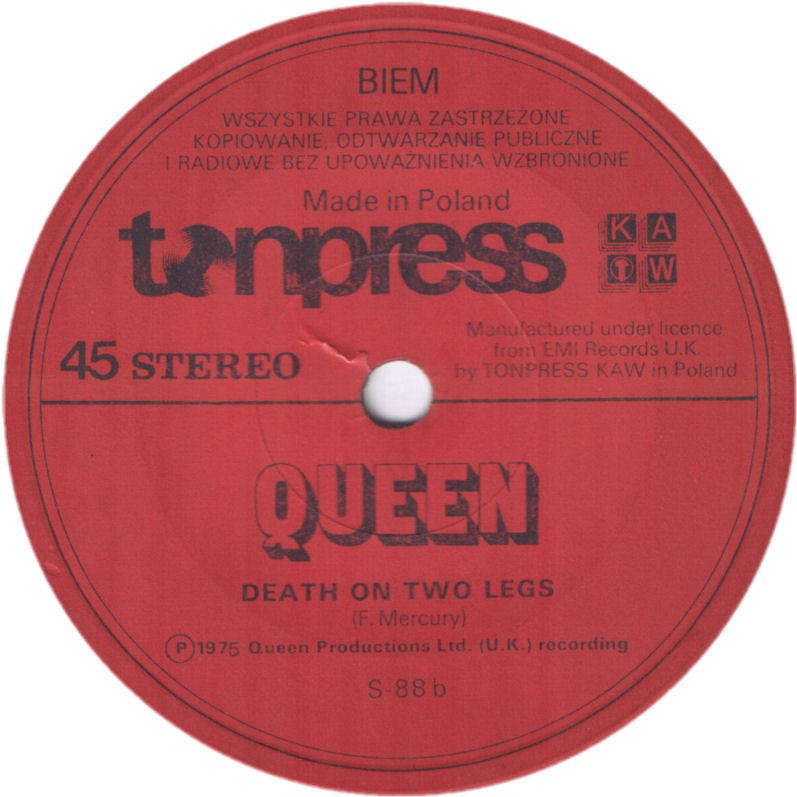
- B-side label of the Poland vinyl pressing of the "Bohemian Rhapsody" single release

Song by Queen

from the album A Night at the Opera
- A-side: "Bohemian Rhapsody" (Poland)
- Published: Queen Music Ltd.
- Released: 28 November 1975
- Recorded: August–November 1975
- Studio: Sarm East, London
- Genre: Hard rock; heavy metal
- Length: 3:43
- Label: EMI; Elektra
- Songwriter: Freddie Mercury
- Producers: Queen; Roy Thomas Baker

"Death on Two Legs (Dedicated to...)" (sometimes shortened to "Death on Two Legs") is a song by the British rock band Queen and is the opening track on their fourth album A Night at the Opera. The song was written by Freddie Mercury about the band's fall-out with their original manager and Trident Studios owner Norman Sheffield. Though the song makes no direct reference to him, Sheffield sued both the band and the record label for defamation. This resulted in an out-of-court settlement, thus revealing to the public his connection with the song. Mercury said that his lawyer had cautioned him against discussing the lyrics, but that it was written from a "very emotional" place for which he felt music was the best outlet. Roger Taylor also noted that despite the success of "Killer Queen" and Sheer Heart Attack, the album preceding A Night at the Opera, the band was lacking money before the album was made. Sheffield denied that he or his companies had mistreated the band in his capacity as manager, and cited the original 1972 management contracts between himself and Queen in his 2013 memoir, Life on Two Legs, in his defence.

The song was recorded and mixed at Sarm East Studios in late 1975. As with "Bohemian Rhapsody", most of the guitar parts on the song were initially played on piano by Mercury, to demonstrate to Brian May how they needed to be played on guitar.

== Composition ==
The song, which is in 4/4 meter, is dominated by guitars, strong lead and backing vocals as well as piano. It has a piano arpeggio intro with heavy guitars, bowed double bass, mechanical sounding noise and a loud shriek by Roger Taylor, which abruptly leads into the song in B minor. There are numerous subsections and layers, as was typical for Queen at the time. The verses have short sections with the tempo virtually halved, and the choruses are emphasised with strong harmonies and drum fills.

DRUM! magazine said of Taylor's drum work: "[...] Shortly after the 2/4 measure there's an unusual snare accent on the & of 4 and a change to a half-time groove. These back-and-forth feel changes continue throughout the song and Taylor somehow makes them flow smoothly."

== Lyrics ==
Freddie Mercury later recalled that he had tried to make the lyrics as "coarse as possible", and that the other band members were initially shocked at the harsh lyrics. However, the band agreed that the song should be performed as Mercury intended, and it was recorded as such.

Author Michael Chabon remarked that "A Night at the Opera is where I progressed from 45s to albums. It was gatefold, with the lyrics printed on the inside, and you could just sit there poring over them and trying to figure who Freddie might be talking about on songs like 'Death on Two Legs'."

== Live recordings ==
"Death on Two Legs" was regularly performed live by Queen up to and including The Game Tour. Only one live version of the song has been officially released, on the 1979 album Live Killers. The piano introduction, however, was played during the Hot Space and The Works tours. During live performances Mercury would usually dedicate the song to "a real motherfucker of a gentleman." This line ("This is about a dirty, nasty old man, we call him motherfucker, you know what motherfucker means?") was shortened and censored (using bleeps) on Live Killers.

The song is featured in Rock Band Blitz, subsequently released as downloadable content in the Rock Band store, performed by Queen themselves.

== Personnel ==
- Freddie Mercury – lead and backing vocals, piano
- Brian May – guitars, backing vocals
- Roger Taylor – drums, backing vocals
- John Deacon – bass guitar, double bass

== See also ==
- 1975 in music
- Queen discography
- "Five Per Cent For Nothing", 1971 Yes instrumental whose title disparages the band's former manager
- "Barracuda", 1977 Heart song which similarly disparages the band's record label
