= Adam (album) =

Sixth album by Adam Lambert

Studio album by Adam Lambert
- Released: July 10, 2026
- Length: 38:05
- Labels: The Orchard; More is More
- Producers: Jez Ashurst; Donny Bravo; Trey Campbell; Eren Cannata; Jean Castel; Adam Lambert; Roy Lenzo; Alexander Lewis; Bonnie McKee; Matias Mora; Pete Nappi; ONR; Kyle Reith; Anwar Sawyer; Slushpuppy

Adam Lambert chronology
High Drama (2023)	Adam (2026)

Singles from Adam
- 1. "Eat U Alive" Released: May 8, 2026; 2. "Under the Rhythm" Released: June 5, 2026; 3. "Cloud 9" Released: July 10, 2026

Adam (stylized in all caps) is the sixth studio album by the American singer Adam Lambert. It was released independently on 10 July 2026 through Lambert's record label, More Is More, and distributed via The Orchard. The album blends Lambert's pop vocals with 1990s-inspired industrial rock and dark industrial pop elements.

The album was preceded by the lead single "Eat U Alive". Upon release, it debuted at number 98 on the UK Albums Chart, 36 on the ARIA Chart and 12 on the US Top Dance Albums chart. It was later preceded by the second single "Under the Rhythm". The album's sixth track "Cloud 9" was released as the third single alongside the album's release.

== Release and reception ==
Adam received praise from music critics, who praised Lambert's vocal execution and the album's distinct stylistic departure toward a grittier, darker sonic architecture. Writing for The Music, Bryget Chrisfield noted that the album "oozes with agency and ownership", drawing particular attention to the "industrial, New York-referencing" production of the opener "Rat City".

Marcel Schlutt from Kaltblut Magazine noted the album's "tense interplay between aggressive synth textures and Lambert’s expansive vocal delivery."

Following the album release, Lambert promoted the album with several album release concerts, including a London performance at the Roundhouse, a concert that Callum Wells of Attitude magazine praised as "the kind of old-school concert experience where musicianship alone commanded the stage."

== Track listing ==
Adam track listing
No.	Title	Writer(s)	Producer(s)	Length
1.	"Rat City" (featuring Isaac Dunbar)	Adam Lambert; Isaac Dunbar; Victor James; Victor Jamieson; Matias Mora; Pete Nappi	Mora^{[p]}; Nappi^{[p]}	2:57
2.	"Necklace"	Lambert; Eren Cannata; Samuel Catalano; Jaramye Daniels; Jordan Gable	Nappi; Slushpuppy; Cannata^{[c]}; Dylan Harrison^{[c]}; Mora^{[a]}	2:50
3.	"Eat U Alive"	Lambert; Gable; Alna Hofmeyr; Nappi; David Pramik	Nappi^{[p]}; Brasko^{[c]}; Pramik^{[c]}^{[v]}	2:51
4.	"Porcelain" (featuring Lexie Liu)	Lambert; Cannata; Gable; Mora	Cannata; Mora; Nappi	3:06
5.	"Sanity"	Lambert; Brandon Campbell; Donald Phillip; Anwar Sawyer	Donny Bravo; Trey Campbell^{[p]}; Nappi; Sawyer	3:24
6.	"Cloud 9"	Lambert; Jonathan Asperil; B. Campbell; Rosario Lenzo; Nappi; Ariana Wong	T. Campbell^{[p]}; Nappi^{[c]}	3:08
7.	"Am I OK"	Lambert; Jez Ashurst; Bryn Christopher; Nappi; Olivia Sebastianelli	Lambert^{[p]}; Ashurst; Nappi^{[p]}	3:53
8.	"Under the Rhythm"	Lambert; B. Campbell; Jean Castells; Alex Christensen; Leo Lalou; Peter Könemann; Nappi; Aleksey Potekhin; Wyatt Sanders; Sergey Zhukov	T. Campbell^{[p]}; Jean Castel; Nappi^{[p]}; Tigri^{[c]}	2:50
9.	"Rage"	Lambert; Jesse Geller; Bonnie McKee; Mora; Madonna Ringel	McKee^{[p]}; Mora^{[p]}; Nappi	3:42
10.	"Real Luv"	Lambert; B. Campbell; Brandon Colbein; Alexander Lewis	T. Campbell^{[p]}; Lewis; Nappi	3:19
11.	"Don't Stop Driving"	Lambert; B. Campbell; Lenzo; David Mørup; Nappi; Jordan Sudak	T. Campbell^{[p]}; Roy Lenzo; Nappi^{[p]}; Kyle Reith; Mørup^{[c]}	3:14
12.	"Do Ya See Me Now"	Lambert; Robert Shields; Nappi	T. Campbell^{[p]}; Nappi^{[p]}; ONR	2:45
Total length:				38:05

=== Notes ===
- ^{^[p]} indicates a producer and vocal producer
- ^{^[c]} indicates a co-producer
- ^{^[a]} indicates an additional producer
- ^{^[v]} indicates a vocal producer

== Personnel ==
Credits are adapted from Tidal.

- Adam Lambert – lead vocals
- Kevin Grainger – mixing (tracks 1–6, 8–12), surround mixing (all tracks)
- Leo Butler – surround mixing
- Jonas W. Karlsson – mastering
- Alex Gomme – additional mixing (1–6, 8–12)
- Josh Sutton-Smith – additional mixing (1–6, 8–12)
- Wired Masters – mixing (1, 2, 4, 5, 8–12), surround mixing (1, 2, 4, 5, 7–12)
- Matias Mora – engineering (1, 4, 9)
- Pete Nappi – engineering (1, 8, 11, 12), synthesizer (11)
- Isaac Dunbar – lead vocals (1)
- Lexie Liu – lead vocals (4)
- Ian Rene – engineering (5, 6, 8–10)
- Milo Romaguera – engineering (5)
- David Poeppel – engineering (11, 12)
- Matthew Huber – mixing (7)
- Jeff Hooker – drums (11)
- Mattis Jakobsen – guitars (11)
- Elias Danielsen – synthesizer (11)
- Kyle Reith – synthesizer (11)
- Roy Lenzo – synthesizer (11)
- Ryan Davis – design
- Nick Knight – cover art
