= Velvet (Adam Lambert album) =

Studio album by Adam Lambert
- Released: March 20, 2020
- Recorded: 2019
- Genres: Funk rock; disco; glam rock; soul
- Length: 44:00
- Labels: More Is More; Empire
- Producers: Tommy English; Steve Booker; Noise Club; Butch Walker; Fred Ball

Adam Lambert chronology
Velvet: Side A (The Live Sessions) (2019)	Velvet (2020)	High Drama (2023)

Adam Lambert studio album chronology
The Original High (2015)	Velvet (2020)	High Drama (2023)

Singles from Velvet
- 1. "Feel Something" Released: February 22, 2019; 2. "New Eyes" Released: May 15, 2019; 3. "Comin in Hot" Released: June 26, 2019; 4. "Superpower" Released: September 4, 2019; 5. "Roses" Released: February 4, 2020; 6. "Velvet" Released: March 20, 2020

Velvet (stylized in all caps) is the fourth studio album by American singer Adam Lambert, released through More Is More and Empire Distribution on March 20, 2020. It features the singles "Feel Something", "New Eyes", "Comin in Hot", "Superpower", and "Roses" with Nile Rodgers, as well as all the tracks featured on the Velvet: Side A EP, released in September 2019. Lambert was scheduled to promote the album with five appearances at the Venetian Las Vegas on April 18, 19, 22, 24 and 25 (postponed due to the COVID-19 pandemic) before embarking on a European tour from August to September 2020.

== Background ==
Lambert described the album as "thirteen slinky numbers to catch a vibe to".

== Critical reception ==
Professional ratings
Aggregate scores
Source	Rating
Metacritic	84/100
Review scores
Source	Rating
AllMusic	4/5 stars
Clash	8/10

Velvet received positive reviews from critics, with some calling it Lambert's best work to date. The album has a score of 84 on Metacritic indicating "universal acclaim". Writing for AllMusic, Matt Collar called the album a "new and delightfully retro direction", as well as a "dazzling, glitter-dipped exercise in '70s disco-era funk, rock, and soul". Stephen Daw of Billboard stated that the record was "continuing in the same vein of late '60s funk rock that's fueled his latest releases". A.D. Amorosi of Variety praised the record, writing "the 38-year-old out singer goes for something less glamorously amorously entertaining and more grimily soulful and sleekly funky than we're used to hearing from him" and "Adam Lambert has made "Velvet" a testament to finding his way, personally and professionally, in what is his most accomplished solo work to date".

== Track listing ==
Velvet track listing
No.	Title	Writer(s)	Producer(s)	Length
1.	"Velvet"	Adam Lambert; Busbee; Jeremy Dussolliet; Tim "One Love" Sommers; Ryan Daly	Busbee; Sommers; Daly	2:58
2.	"Superpower"	Lambert; Tommy English; Ilsey Juber	English	3:10
3.	"Stranger You Are"	Lambert; Steve Booker; Kes Kross	Booker	2:52
4.	"Loverboy"	Lambert; English; Angelo Petraglia; Gabe Simon	English	3:20
5.	"Roses" (with Nile Rodgers)	Lambert; Fred Ball; Kross; Daniel Wilson; Palmer Reed	Ball	3:49
6.	"Closer to You"	Lambert; Rob McCurdy; Chris Petrosino; Asia Whiteacre	Noise Club	4:19
7.	"Overglow"	Lambert; Butch Walker; MNEK; Amy Kuney	Walker	3:32
8.	"Comin in Hot"	Lambert; Michelle Buzz; Andre Davidson; Sean Davidson; Katie Pearlman	The Monarch	2:48
9.	"On the Moon"	Lambert; Jorgen Odegard; Britt Burton; Sam Sparro; Xela	Odegard	3:58
10.	"Love Dont"	Lambert; Joe Janiak	English; Janiak	3:40
11.	"Ready to Run"	Lambert; Ball; Kross	Ball	3:09
12.	"New Eyes"	Lambert; Paris Carney; Jamie Seirota	Seirota	3:44
13.	"Feel Something"	Lambert; Josh Cumbee; Benedict Cork	Cumbee	2:58
Total length:				44:00

Notes

- "Love Dont" is sometimes written as "Love Don't", with an apostrophe.

== Charts ==
Chart performance for Velvet
Chart (2020)	Peak position
Australian Albums (ARIA)	8
Belgian Albums (Ultratop Flanders)	112
Belgian Albums (Ultratop Wallonia)	194
German Albums (Offizielle Top 100)	77
Scottish Albums (Official Charts)	19
Spanish Albums (PROMUSICAE)	66
Swiss Albums (Schweizer Hitparade)	67
UK Albums (Official Charts)	54
US Billboard 200	89
US Independent Albums (Billboard)	10
