= Benedict Cork =

English singer-songwriter (born 1993)

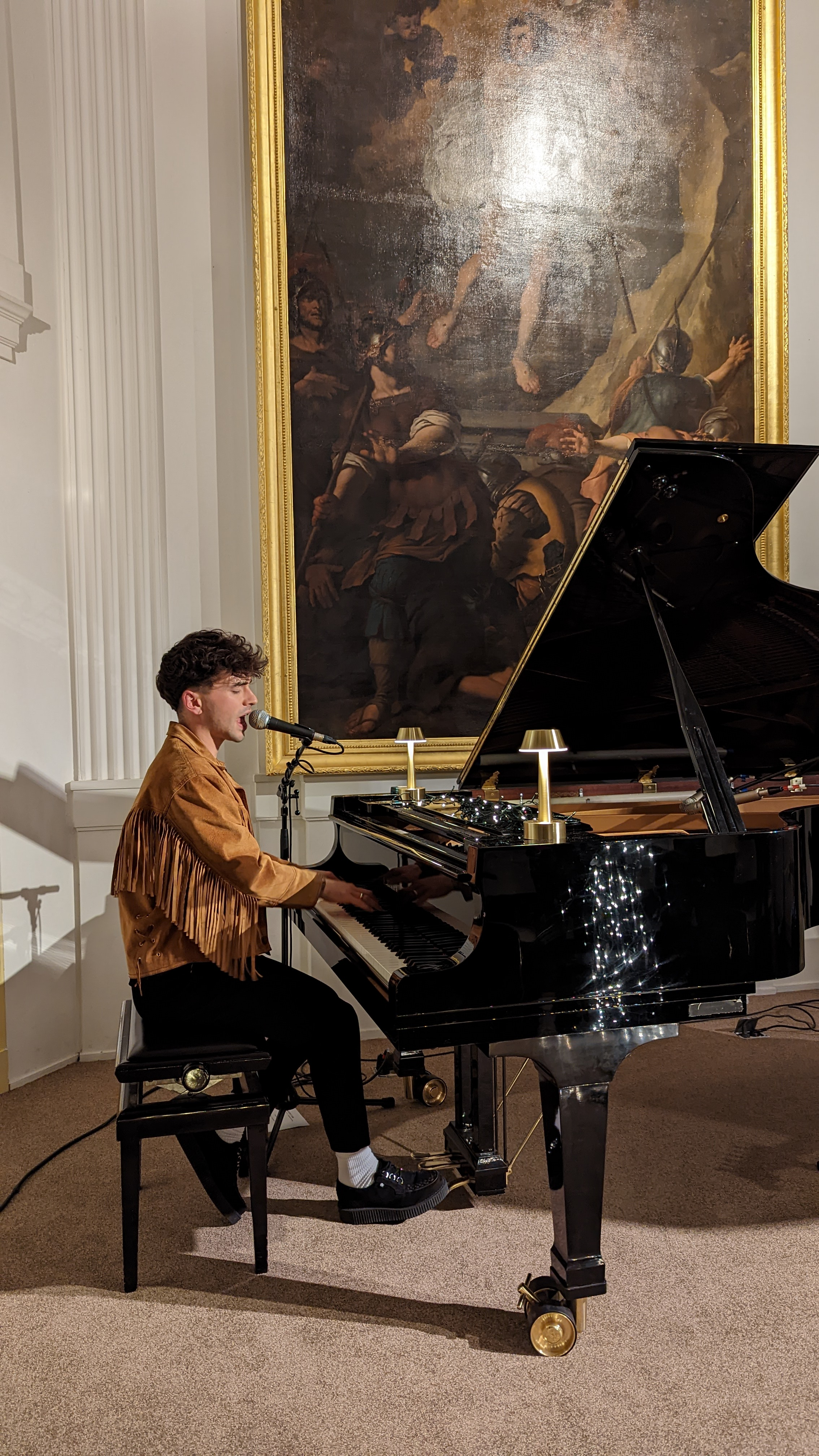

Background information
- Born: Benjamin Mark Cork; 4 August 1993 (age 33)
- Origin: Bishop's Stortford, England
- Occupations: Singer-songwriter, musician
- Instruments: Vocals, piano
- Years active: 2018–present
- Website: www.benedictcork.co.uk

Benjamin Mark Cork (born 4 August 1993), known professionally as Benedict Cork, is an English singer-songwriter. He began releasing music in 2018, writing and recording a series of EPs before his debut album Notes On A Hopeless Romance was released May 2024.

== Early life ==
Cork was born Benjamin Mark Cork to Andrew Cork and Julia (née Kornberg). His maternal grandfather, Sir Hans Kornberg, was a German-born British-American biochemist whose parents were killed in the Holocaust. Cork has two older brothers and one older sister, SuRie, who represented the United Kingdom in the Eurovision Song Contest 2018 in Lisbon, Portugal. Cork was educated at The Bishop's Stortford High School and Hills Road Sixth Form College.

== Career ==
Cork's official recording career began with a collaboration with Simon Jefferis, Easy on Deep Matter Records. His first solo release was Piano Tapes in September 2018, a live five-track EP recorded at Red Gate Recorders in Eagle Rock, California. Elton John, on hearing the EP, referred to Cork as "sensational" and "a name to look out for". The single Mama Said was described as "devastatingly beautiful" by Billboard.

Cork's second EP, Letters To Strangers, was released in 2019 and third EP, Piano Tapes Volume II, in 2020. During this time, Cork supported Emily King and Tom Walker and appeared at British Summer Time in Hyde Park supporting Stevie Wonder and Lionel Richie. Cork also supported Duncan Laurence on his European Tour and appeared in a campaign for French fashion house Mugler alongside English National Ballet dancer Precious Adams performing his song Wildfire.

Cork’s fourth EP Secrets I’ll Never Tell was released in 2021 alongside a miniseries podcast by the same name featuring conversations with several collaborators from the world of entertainment including Adam Lambert, MNEK, Sophia Thakur, Duncan Laurence and Kyle Hanagami. The guests came from various ethnic and social backgrounds, and discussed topics such as mental health, authenticity, sexuality and specific challenges for artists arising from the COVID-19 pandemic and subsequent lockdowns. Cork released his fifth EP If These Walls Could Talk in 2022.

Cork spent 2023 recording his debut album in London. During the summer of 2023, he supported Adam Lambert at the Royal Albert Hall and Tors on their UK tour before signing to Kartel Music Group and releasing the first single, Soulmates, from his album. Cork embarked on his We Coulda Been Soulmates European tour October 2023 and announced his first US headline tour for February/March 2024.

Cork announced his debut album Notes On A Hopeless Romance January 2024 before releasing the second and third singles Reasons I Loved You (I Can't Think Of One) and Nice Guy accompanied by a live headline tour running through May/June 2024.

Notes On A Hopeless Romance was released May 2024 and was supported by BBC Radio 1, BBC Introducing 3CR, Spotify’s GLOW campaign and F Word Magazine’s first digital cover story. Benedict also supported Tors throughout their European tour September 2024. In May 2025, Cork announced the deluxe version of his debut album, Footnotes On A Hopeless Romance for release July 2025 featuring two new singles, Deep Dive and What It Is To Be Loved, plus an interlude featuring Irish actor Andrew Scott. During this time, Cork also wrote and produced music for a production of Four Play at The King's Head Theatre, London.

== Discography ==
=== Album ===
Title	Details
Notes On A Hopeless Romance	Released: 10 May 2024; Format: Digital download, CD, Vinyl

=== Extended plays ===
Title	Details
Piano Tapes (Live at Red Gate Recorders)	Released: 20 September 2018; Format: Digital download, CD, Vinyl (combined with Piano Tapes, Volume II)
Letters To Strangers	Released: 13 August 2019; Format: Digital download, CD, Vinyl (combined with Secrets I'll Never Tell)
Piano Tapes, Volume II	Released: 30 September 2020; Format: Digital download, CD, Vinyl (combined with Piano Tapes, Volume I)
If These Walls Could Talk	Released: 22 April 2022; Format: Digital download, CD, Vinyl (combined with Live From Collins Music Hall)
Live From Collins Music Hall	Released: 17 December 2022; Format: Digital download, CD, Vinyl (combined with If These Walls Could Talk)
Live From Bush Hall	Released: July 10, 2024; Format: Digital download, CD

=== Singles ===
Title	Year	Album
"Easy (with Simon Jefferis)"	2018	non-album single
"Ghost"	2018	Piano Tapes (Live at Red Gate Recorders)
"Mama Said"	2018	Piano Tapes (Live at Red Gate Recorders)
"Down for Forever"	2018	Piano Tapes (Live at Red Gate Recorders)
"Believe"	2018	Piano Tapes (Live at Red Gate Recorders)
"Wildfire"	2018	Piano Tapes (Live at Red Gate Recorders)
"Therapy"	2019	Letters To Strangers
"Fear of Lonely"	2019	Letters To Strangers
"Funny How Things Change"	2019	Letters To Strangers
"Breaking Hearts"	2019	Letters To Strangers
"Pray No More"	2019	Letters To Strangers
"Boys Don’t Cry"	2019	Letters To Strangers
"Heaven Is a Place on Earth (Cover)"	2019	non-album single
"Hollywood"	2020	Piano Tapes, Volume II
"One Last Song"	2020	Piano Tapes, Volume II
"Growing Pains"	2020	Piano Tapes, Volume II
"Choices"	2020	Piano Tapes, Volume II
"Wild One"	2020	Piano Tapes, Volume II
"All My Famous Friends"	2021	Secrets I'll Never Tell
"Have A Good Life (See You Never)"	2021	Secrets I'll Never Tell
"Sick of the Parties"	2021	Secrets I'll Never Tell
"The Lucky Ones"	2021	Secrets I'll Never Tell
"At Least We Tried"	2021	Secrets I'll Never Tell
"The Life We Planned"	2021	If These Walls Could Talk
"Miracle"	2022	If These Walls Could Talk
"If These Walls Could Talk"	2022	If These Walls Could Talk
"All The Love Songs Sound The Same"	2022	If These Walls Could Talk
"Where The Wild Things Go"	2022	If These Walls Could Talk
"Dream Of You"	2022	non-album single
"Try Sleeping With A Broken Heart"	2022	non-album single
"Soulmates"	2023	Notes On A Hopeless Romance
"Reasons I Loved You (I Can't Think Of One)"	2024	Notes On A Hopeless Romance
"Nice Guy"	2024	Notes On A Hopeless Romance
"Beauty Queen"	2024	Notes On A Hopeless Romance
"God Damn"	2024	Notes On A Hopeless Romance
"Deep Dive"	2025	Footnotes On A Hopeless Romance (Notes On A Hopeless Romance Deluxe, streaming only)
"What It Is To Be Loved"	2025	Footnotes On A Hopeless Romance (Notes On A Hopeless Romance Deluxe, streaming only)

=== Songwriting credits ===
- Auryn - "Right Thing To Do" on Ghost Town
- Mark Feehily - "Love Me, Or Leave Me Alone" on Fire
- Adam Lambert - "Feel Something" on Velvet
- Ørjan Nilsen - "Hold me"

=== Performance credits ===
- ORKID - "Hands" on I Don't Give A Damn (piano)
- Angel Haze - "April's Fool" on Dirty Gold (vocals)
- Adam Lambert - "Feel Something" on Velvet (piano/backing vocals)
- Ørjan Nilsen - "Hold me" (vocals)
- Adam Lambert - "I'm A Man" on High Drama (backing vocals)
