= Fiasco (magazine) =

UK fashion, arts and culture magazine

- Creative director: Elliott Morgan
- Managing editor: Taylor Glasby
- Fashion director: Krishan Parmar
- Staff editor: Eva K. Salvi
- Categories: Culture, fashion
- Circulation: 96,000
- Publisher: Daniel Haim
- Founder: Vincent Nord
- Founded: 2010
- Company: Stellur, Inc.
- Country: United Kingdom
- Based in: London
- Language: English
- Website: fiascomag.com

Fiasco is a unisex, fashion, arts and culture magazine featuring interviews, photography, art and illustrations from fashion photographers and stylists around the world. It was launched in 2010 by British photographer Vincent Nord with a monthly print edition and an online lifestyle publication.

== The model diaries ==
In 2013, Fiasco launched a series of videos including behind-the-scenes footage of photo shoots and select interviews with various talent and celebrities. Models from a number of agencies including Ford Models, Elite Models and Select Model Management participated in the series. Entertainment icons including Lee “Scratch” Perry, singer Pixie Lott, and rapper Ludacris were among the prominent celebrities that were highlighted.

== In popular culture ==
Fiasco's photography and in-depth interviews have often been featured in mainstream media. A number of renowned actors, musicians, bands and entertainment icons have participated in Fiasco photoshoots including Sir Ian Mckellen, Emily Berrington, Vanessa White, Daniel Radcliffe, Pixie Lott, Nathan Sykes, Adam Lambert, Little Mix, Hudson Taylor, The Vamps, Wretch 32, Stooshe and Ke$ha.

In 2012, Little Mix dressed up as '60s icons' in a black and white photoshoot for Fiasco following the launch of their debut single "Cannonball" which reached number one in the UK iTunes chart.

Prior to the 2013 Summertime Ball, British band Union J participated in a photoshoot and interview with Fiasco where each member was covered for the launch of a special pop music edition of the magazine.

== Circulation ==
Launched in 2010 as a print and digital magazine, Fiasco had a circulation of 96,000 in 2012. The digital version of the magazine was made available online, with over 9 million views.
