= Adam Lambert =

American singer (born 1982)

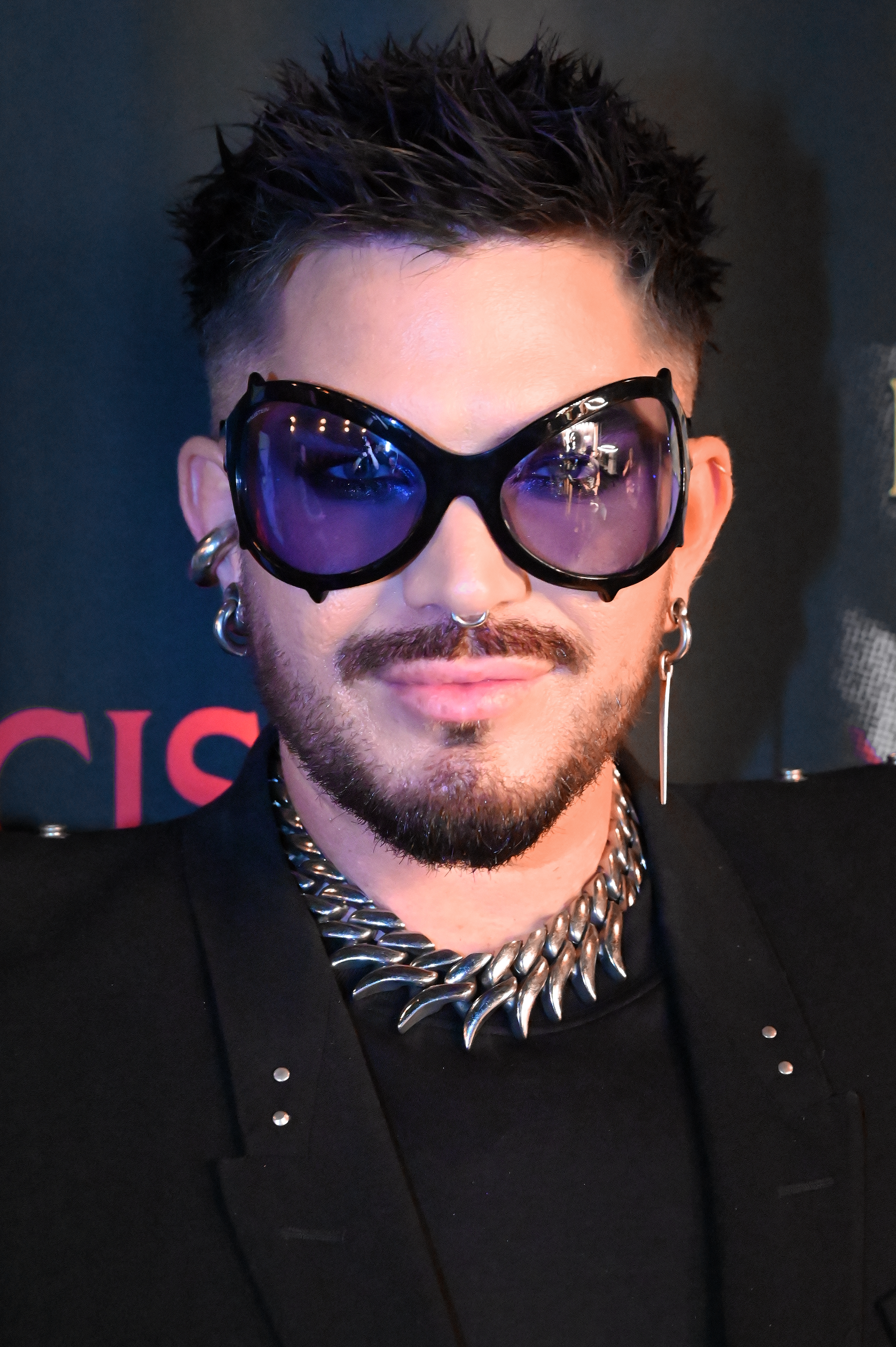
- Lambert in 2025
- Born: Adam Mitchel Lambert; January 29, 1982 (age 44); Indianapolis, Indiana, U.S.
- Occupations: Singer; songwriter; actor
- Years active: 2001–present
- Musical career
- Origin: San Diego, California, U.S.
- Genres: Pop; dance; electronic
- Instrument: Vocals
- Labels: 19; RCA; Warner; Empire; Warner Music Group/EastWest
- Member of: Queen + Adam Lambert
- Website: adamlambert.net

Signature
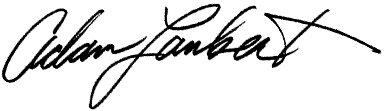

Adam Mitchel Lambert (born January 29, 1982) is an American singer, songwriter and actor. He is known for his dynamic vocal performances that combine his theatrical training with modern and classic genres. Lambert rose to fame in 2009 after finishing as runner-up on the eighth season of American Idol. Later that year, he released his debut album For Your Entertainment, which debuted at number three on the U.S. Billboard 200. The album spawned several singles, including "Whataya Want from Me", for which he received a Grammy nomination for Best Male Pop Vocal Performance. He is also known for replacing Paul Rodgers for a reunion project known as Queen + Adam Lambert, which features the remaining members of rock band Queen.

In 2012, Lambert released his second studio album Trespassing. The album premiered at number one on the U.S. Billboard 200, making him the first openly gay artist to top the album charts. In 2015, Lambert released his third album The Original High, which debuted at number three on the U.S. Billboard 200 and produced the single "Ghost Town". Since 2009, he has sold over three million albums and five million singles worldwide. Lambert released his fourth studio album, Velvet, in 2020, followed by his fifth studio album, High Drama, in 2023. His self-titled sixth studio album, ADAM, was released on July 10, 2026.

Alongside his solo career, Lambert has performed with Queen in several worldwide tours from 2012. Their first album, Live Around the World, was released in October 2020, and debuted at number one on the UK Albums Chart.

In late 2019, Lambert founded the non-profit Feel Something Foundation, anchoring his ongoing philanthropy, LGBTQ+ and human rights activism. Its particular focus is support for organizations and projects that directly and disproportionately impact the LGBTQ+ community, including education and the arts, mental health, suicide prevention and homelessness.

Lambert made his Broadway debut in 2024, replacing Eddie Redmayne as the Emcee in the revival of Cabaret on September 16.

== Early life and family ==
Lambert was born in Indianapolis, Indiana, on January 29, 1982, to mother Leila, a dental hygienist; and father Eber Lambert, a program manager for Novatel Wireless. His father is of English, Norwegian, Irish, French, Danish, and German descent while his mother is Jewish, with Romanian-Jewish roots. Lambert was raised in his mother's religion. He has a younger brother, Neil. Shortly after his birth, his family moved to San Diego, California.

Lambert began performing with Metropolitan Educational Theatre network (now MET2) from the age of 9. A few years later, he began more intense acting and vocal coaching, continuing to perform with both MET2 and what was to become the Broadway Bound Youth Theatre Foundation, as he moved through Mesa Verde Middle School and then Mount Carmel High School. There, he became heavily involved with theater and choir, performed vocals with the school's jazz band, and competed in the local Air Bands competitions. He also appeared in local professional productions such as Hello, Dolly!, Camelot, The Music Man, Grease, Chess and Peter Pan, at venues such as The Starlight, The Lyceum and others.

After graduating from high school in 2000, he attended California State University, Fullerton. His major was musical theater, but he withdrew from the program after five weeks to move to Los Angeles: "I just decided that what I really wanted to do was try to work in the real entertainment world. Life is all about taking risks to get what you want."

== Career ==
=== 2001–2008: Career beginnings ===
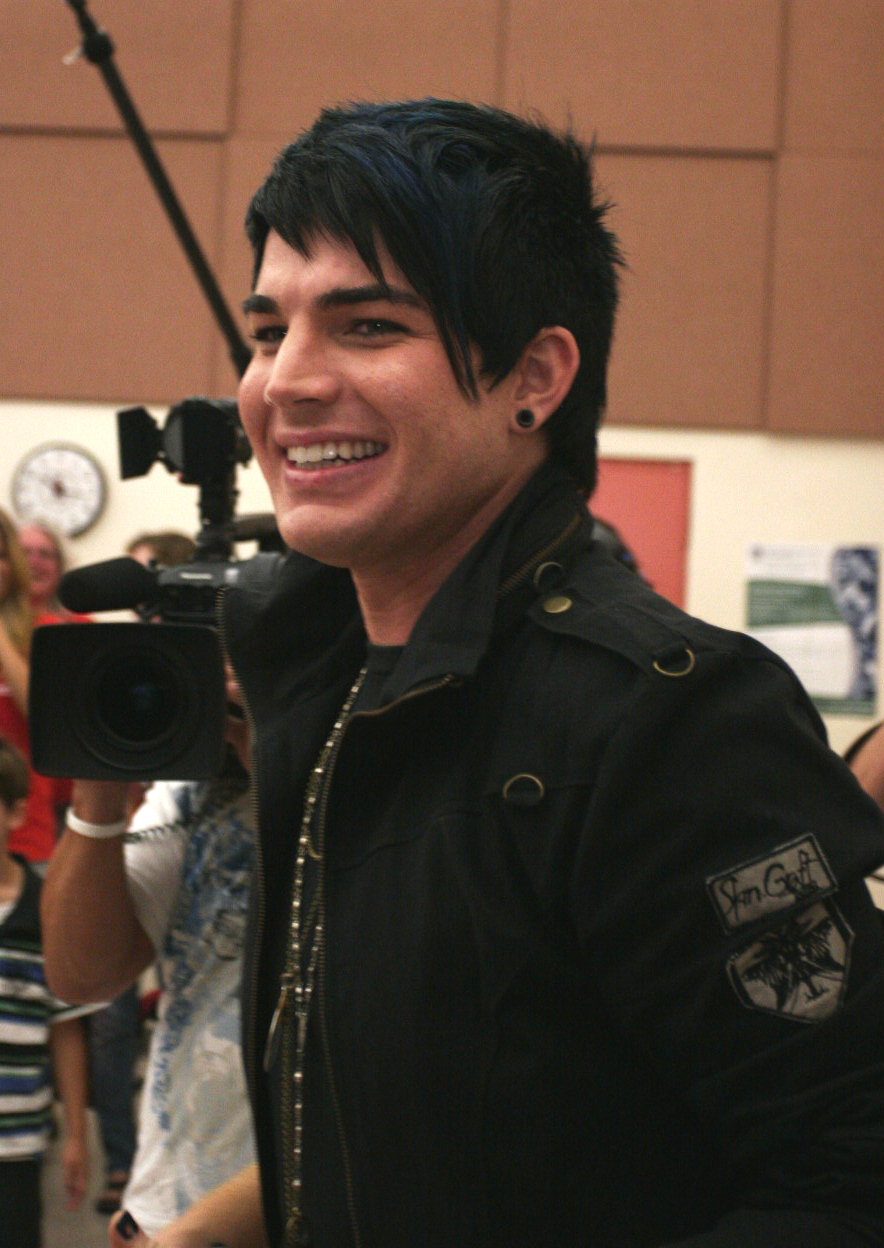
Lambert at Mt. Carmel High School

At 19, Lambert got his first professional job, performing on a cruise ship for ten months with Anita Mann Productions. Afterwards, he performed in light opera in Orange County, California. By 21, he was signed with a manager and cast in a European tour of Hair. In 2004, he appeared in the Theatre Under the Stars (TUTS) production of Brigadoon and a Pasadena Playhouse production of 110 in the Shade, before being cast in the role of Joshua in The Ten Commandments: The Musical at the Kodak Theatre alongside Val Kilmer. He came to the attention of the casting director for Wicked, and was hired as the understudy for the role of Fiyero and an ensemble member in the first national touring production of the musical from 2005, and the Los Angeles production from 2007. He finished performances with the musical in 2008.

During this same period, Lambert briefly fronted underground rock band The Citizen Vein with Steve Sidelnyk, Tommy Victor and Monte Pittman. He also worked as a demo singer and a session musician; a compilation of his 2005 recordings was later released in 2009 on the album Take One.

=== 2009–2011: American Idol, For Your Entertainment, and Glam Nation Tour ===
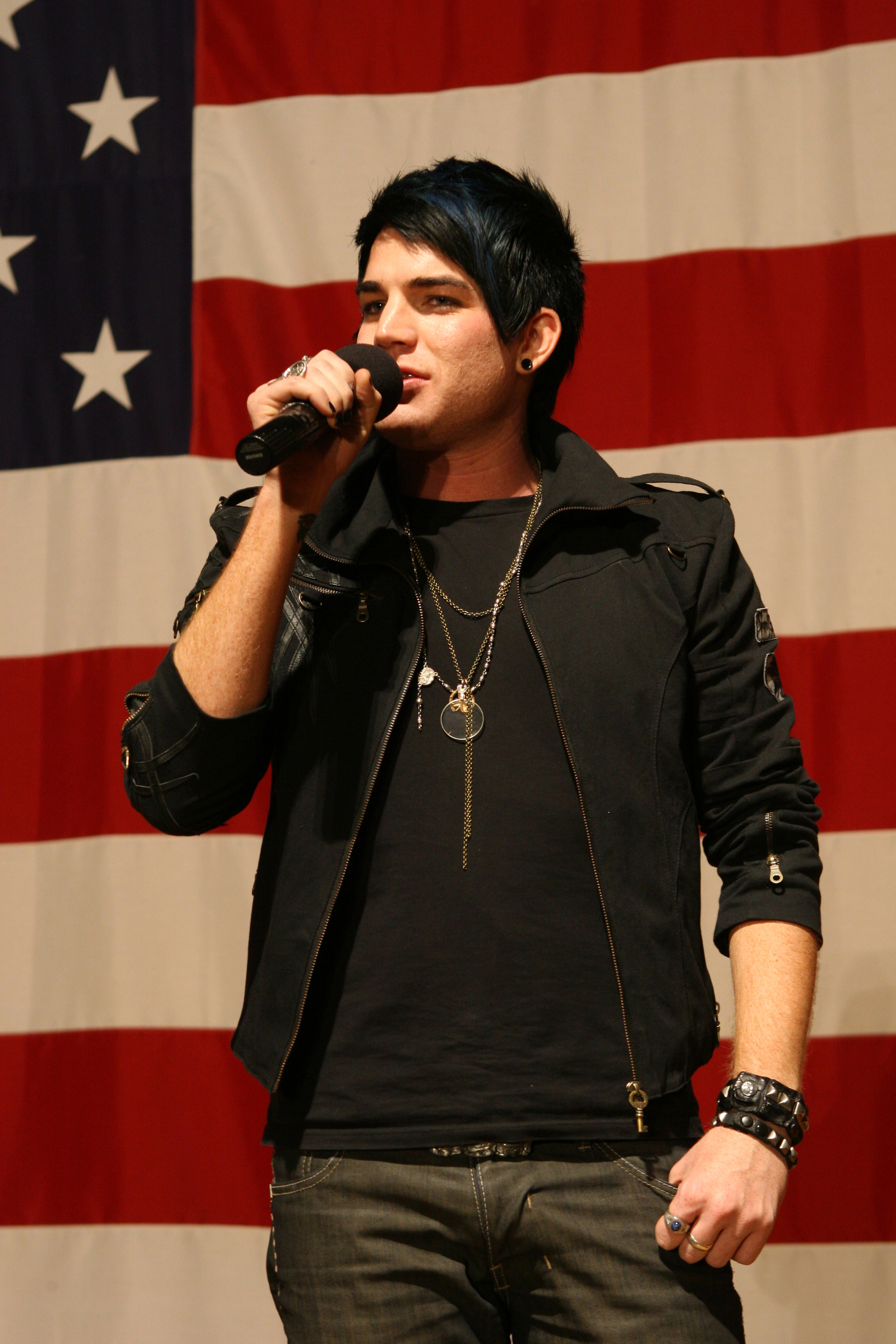
Lambert singing the American national anthem during his visit to MCAS Miramar (2009)

In 2009, Lambert auditioned for the eighth season of American Idol in San Francisco, California by singing "Rock with You" and "Bohemian Rhapsody". Advancing to Hollywood Week, he performed "What's Up" and "Believe" solo, and "Some Kind of Wonderful" in the group effort. Simon Cowell voiced some concern about his theatricality, but Randy Jackson found it "current". He advanced to the top 36 performing "(I Can't Get No) Satisfaction". In the first week of live shows, his rendition of Michael Jackson's "Black or White" was praised by all four judges. For Country week, he sang a sitar-infused version of "Ring of Fire". His Motown night acoustic version of The Miracles' "The Tracks of My Tears" drew praise from judges and a standing ovation from Smokey Robinson, the week's mentor. Advancing to the top 8, he sang the 2001 Michael Andrews and Gary Jules arrangement of "Mad World". Because the show exceeded its time slot, only Cowell gave a critique, which he did by giving Lambert a standing ovation, the only one he bestowed during his decade-long run as an American Idol judge. After Lambert sang "If I Can't Have You", delivering what DioGuardi called his "most memorable performance", Cowell described his vocals as "immaculate". For the top 3 show, he performed "One" before Cowell declared, "If you are not in the final next week, it will be one of the biggest upsets"; and continued with "Cryin'" before Abdul affirmed, "we'll be seeing you next week and many years after that."

In March 2009, photos of Lambert kissing another man while dressed in drag at Burning Man surfaced online. Highlighted as controversial, they were displayed by conservative commentators on The O'Reilly Factor, who called them "embarrassing" and questioned if the images would have an effect on the program. Fox restricted press access to Lambert and to his family following the outing. Despite conservative backlash, outlets such as The New York Times and ABC News speculated that Lambert would be too popular to lose the competition. Upon the announcement of Lambert as runner-up, American Idol pundits, gay bloggers, and LGBT news outlets reassessed these claims, noting that his queerness may have alienated conservative viewers.

Lambert performed three solos in the finale, a reprise of "Mad World", followed by the 1960s civil rights anthem "A Change Is Gonna Come", to tremendously positive judge reaction. After his performance of the mandatory winner's single, "No Boundaries", Cowell summed up Lambert's journey: "Over the entire season, you've been one of the best, most original contestants we've ever had on the show. The hope and whole idea of a show like this is to find a worldwide star, and I truly believe we've found that in you." Upon winning the competition, Kris Allen stated: "Adam deserved this," later explaining he thought Lambert deserved to win as much as he did, and that Lambert "was the most consistent person all year. He was seriously one of the most gifted performers that I've ever met." Lambert's version of the winner's single was released alongside Allen's. The Los Angeles Times later ranked Lambert fifth in its list of the top 120 American Idol contestants, selected from the first nine seasons of the show.

American Idol season 8 performances and results
Week #	Theme	Song choice	Original artist	Order #	Result
Audition	Auditioner's Choice	"Rock with You" "Bohemian Rhapsody"	Michael Jackson; Queen	N/A	Advanced
Hollywood	First Solo	"What's Up"	4 Non Blondes	N/A	Advanced
Hollywood	Group Performance	"Some Kind of Wonderful"	Soul Brothers Six	N/A	Advanced
Hollywood	Second Solo	"Believe"	Cher	N/A	Advanced
Top 36/Semi-final 2	Billboard Hot 100 Hits to Date	"(I Can't Get No) Satisfaction"	The Rolling Stones	12	Advanced
Top 13	Michael Jackson	"Black or White"	Michael Jackson	11	Safe
Top 11	Grand Ole Opry	"Ring of Fire"	Anita Carter	5	Safe
Top 10	Motown	"The Tracks of My Tears"	The Miracles	8	Safe
Top 9	Top Downloads	"Play That Funky Music"	Wild Cherry	8	Safe
Top 8	Year They Were Born (1982)	"Mad World"	Tears for Fears	8	Safe
Top 7	Songs from the Cinema	"Born to Be Wild" – Easy Rider	Steppenwolf	3	Safe
Top 7^{1}	Disco	"If I Can't Have You"	Yvonne Elliman	5	Safe
Top 5	Rat Pack Standards	"Feeling Good"	Cy Grant	5	Bottom 2
Top 4	Rock and Roll Solo; Duet	"Whole Lotta Love" "Slow Ride" with Allison Iraheta	Led Zeppelin; Foghat	1; 6	Safe
Top 3	Judge's Choice (Simon Cowell); Contestant's Choice	"One" "Cryin'"	U2; Aerosmith	3; 6	Safe
Top 2	Contestant's Choice; Simon Fuller's Choice; Coronation Song	"Mad World" "A Change Is Gonna Come" "No Boundaries"	Tears for Fears; Sam Cooke; Kris Allen/Adam Lambert	1; 3; 5	Runner-up

- ^{Note} Due to the judges using their one save to save Matt Giraud, the Top 7 remained intact for another week.

Lambert performed "Mad World" on The Early Show and Live with Regis and Kelly. He began the American Idols LIVE! Tour 2009 in July and that summer was also the recipient of two awards: the Young Hollywood Award for Artist of the Year and the Teen Choice Award for Male Reality/Variety Star at the 2009 Teen Choice Awards.

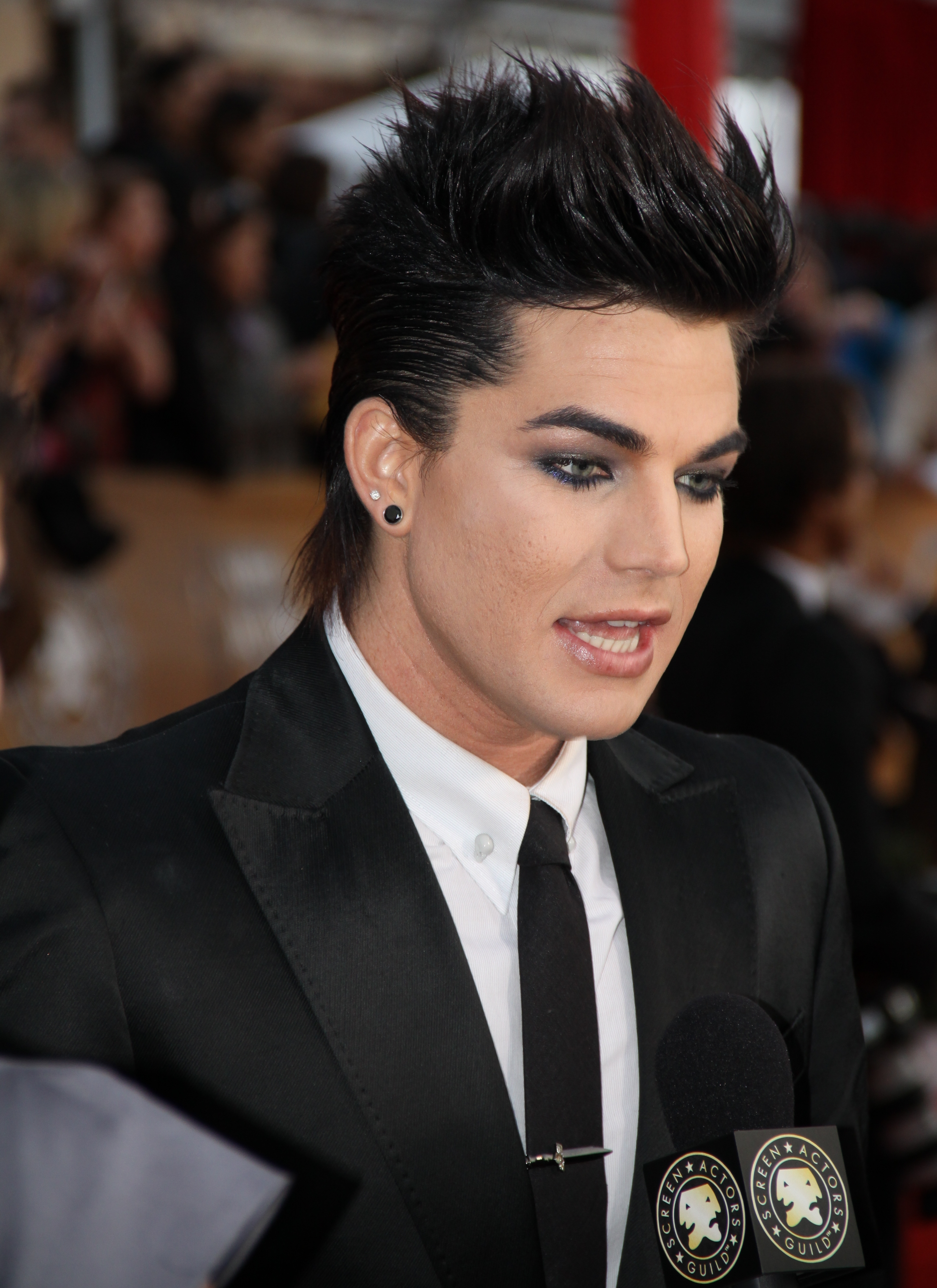
Lambert at the 16th Screen Actors Guild Awards (2010)

For Your Entertainment, Lambert's first studio album, was released on November 23, 2009. Debuting at number three on the Billboard 200 and selling 198,000 copies in the US its first week, the album saw Lambert in collaboration with producers such as Rob Cavallo, Dr. Luke and Max Martin. Album writers included Matt Bellamy, Ryan Tedder, Rivers Cuomo, Justin Hawkins, P!nk, Linda Perry and Lady Gaga. At Metacritic, the album received a score of 71, which indicates "generally favorable reviews". Spin said the album is "perhaps the strongest, most flavorful batch of tunes to reach an AI vet, and Lambert's polymorphous vocal skills unite dancefloor strut and hard-rock pomp in a convincing glam package." Rolling Stone, however, gave it a more mixed review: "The songs sound great but feel strangely stuffy—[it] seems like a disc that was overthought. Next time, the hugely talented Lambert should make sure he's going straight for the gut."

Its Claude Kelly and Dr. Luke-produced lead single "For Your Entertainment" preceded the album's release but was not as successful as its second single "Whataya Want from Me" which impacted on charts worldwide, became his highest-peaking single (at number 10) on the Billboard Hot 100, and was nominated for the Grammy Award for Best Male Pop Vocal Performance at the 53rd awards ceremony. Another notable single was "Time for Miracles", the ending theme for the disaster movie 2012. As of April 2012, For Your Entertainment has sold nearly 2 million copies worldwide and was certified gold in the US in June 2010. On November 22, Lambert performed "For Your Entertainment" at the American Music Awards of 2009. The controversial performance, which was the night's finale, showed Lambert kissing a male bassist and grabbing the crotch of another. In response, the Parents Television Council, a conservative decency group, urged viewers to complain to the FCC and launched a formal complaint—though the performance aired "outside the FCC's usual 6am-10pm time frame prohibiting the broadcast of indecent material." After receiving about 1,500 telephoned complaints, ABC canceled Lambert's November 25 performance on Good Morning America, canceled his upcoming performance on Jimmy Kimmel Live!, and removed him from consideration for Dick Clark's New Year's Rockin' Eve. Discussing the incident in a Rolling Stone interview, Lambert said: "Female performers have been doing this for years—pushing the envelope about sexuality—and the minute a man does it, everybody freaks out. We're in 2009—it's time to take risks, be a little more brave, time to open people's eyes and if it offends them, then maybe I'm not for them. My goal was not to piss people off, it was to promote freedom of expression and artistic freedom." Lambert returned two years later as a presenter at the American Music Awards of 2011 and was warmly received. Rejecting claims that the singer was banned from the show in 2009, executive producer Larry Klein said that he was anticipating future Lambert performances: "Adam Lambert is a friend of ours, he's talented and I like everything about him." Lambert's performance was included in Billboard's list of "Top Ten American Music Awards Moments" on the eve of its 40th anniversary, in November 2012.

In the months leading to his album release, Lambert appeared on the cover of magazines such as Entertainment Weekly in May 2009, Rolling Stone in June 2009 and Details in November 2009. His Rolling Stone cover story became the magazine's best selling issue of the year. He appeared on the cover of Out magazine in their 2009 "Out 100" issue, sparking controversy as Out's publisher issued him an open letter questioning the "gayness" of his image. In April, he became one of People Magazine's Most Beautiful People 2010. He was chosen for Barbara Walters' 10 Most Fascinating People of 2009, and interviewed on the show of December 10. In late 2009, he performed on the Late Show with David Letterman, The Tonight Show with Conan O'Brien, the season finale of So You Think You Can Dance, The Jay Leno Show and The Oprah Winfrey Show. He performed his first official solo concert, which sold out, at Fantasy Springs Resort Casino in Indio, California.

In April 2010, Lambert returned to American Idol on ninth season as the first former contestant to mentor contestants during an Elvis Presley themed week, where he also performed. In June, he appeared on Canada's 2010 MuchMusic Video Awards to receive the UR Fav International Video award for "Whataya Want from Me".

In early June 2010, Lambert embarked on his debut headlining Glam Nation Tour, playing in the United States, Europe and Asia for 113 shows, nearly all of them sold out. The Indianapolis show was filmed for Lambert's first video release Glam Nation Live, a 13-track CD with DVD. The concert, which MTV called "out of this world", and his subsequent video release, were well-received, with Entertainment Weekly saying it "sizzles" with the energy that Lambert's vocals bring in a live concert setting. Glam Nation Live debuted at number one on the SoundScan Music Video chart and landed at number 12 on Billboard's 2011 year-end music video sales chart. This followed the release of his first extended play, Acoustic Live!, consisting of acoustic versions of songs recorded live in various countries. The EP garnered excellent reviews and was called "electrifying" by the New York Daily News. In March 2011, Lambert appeared on tenth season of American Idol to perform his song "Aftermath" and in August, he was profiled in an hour-long documentary for Behind the Music series. Later in 2011, he again appeared as a mentor on a singing competition, this time on The Hub's Majors & Minors, coaching singing contestants who were children. In November 2011, Lambert joined Queen as the lead singer at the MTV Europe Music Awards, where the band was honored with the MTV Europe Music Award for Global Icon and performed a medley of classic hits.

Lambert changed management from 19 Entertainment to Direct Management Group in August 2011. The title track of his second studio album, Trespassing, was co-written with Pharrell Williams; while the album's lead single, "Better Than I Know Myself", a collaboration with Dr. Luke and Claude Kelly, was released digitally on December 20, 2011.

=== 2012–2013: Trespassing ===
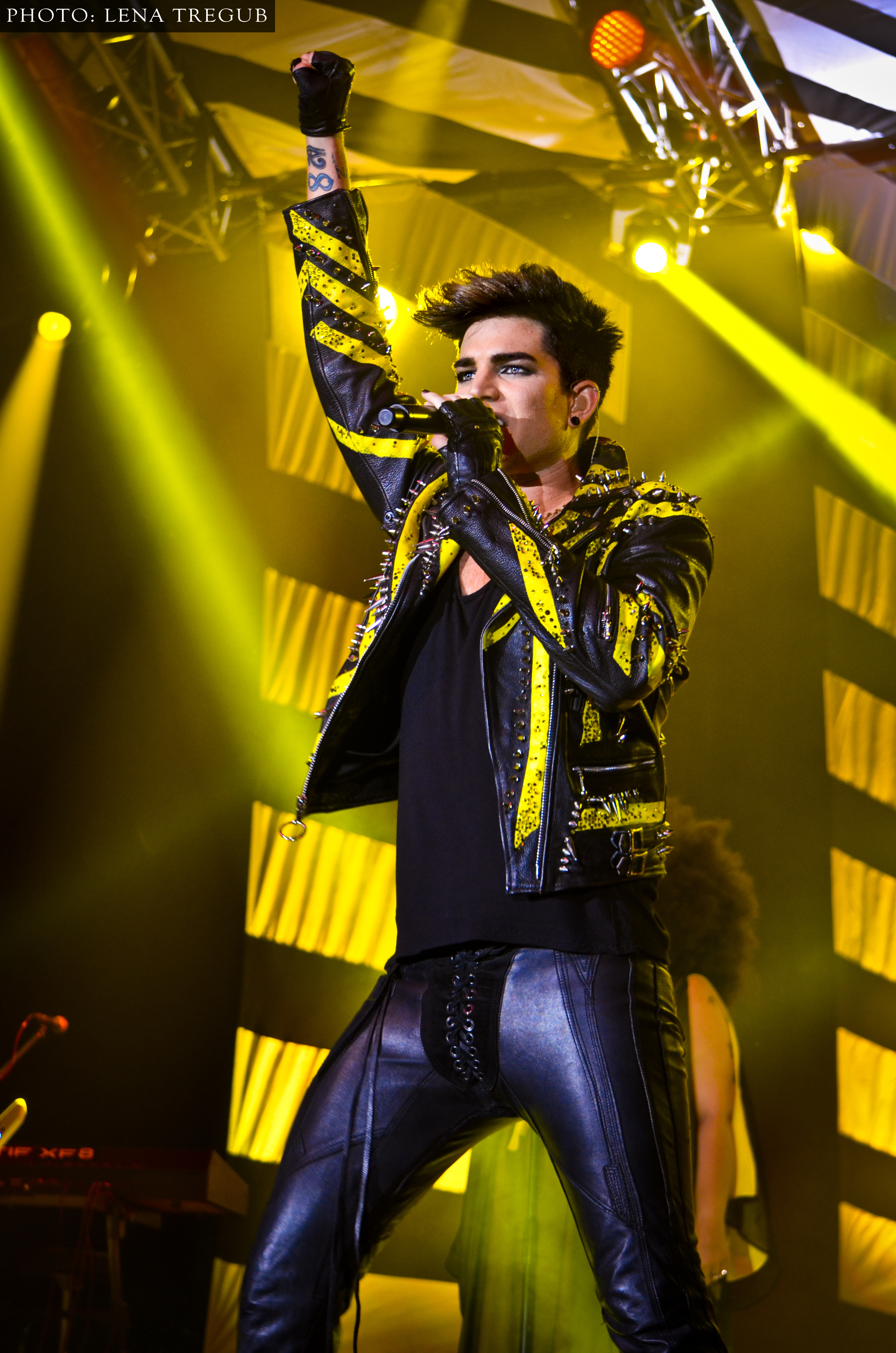
Lambert performing on tour in Kyiv, Ukraine, in March 2013

Trespassing was released on May 15, 2012, to positive reviews. On May 23, the album debuted at number one on the Billboard 200 chart, selling 77,000 copies, and at number three in United Kingdom's midweek chart. His second single "Never Close Our Eyes", written by Bruno Mars and produced by Dr. Luke, was released digitally on April 17, to positive reviews. Lambert returned to American Idol for his third consecutive year on the results show that preceded eleventh season's finale week. The performance of May 17 of "Never Close Our Eyes" was touted for its vibrant energy and dazzle, as well as for the powerhouse vocals that had become his signature.

Throughout the spring and summer of 2012, Lambert performed across Europe, North America, Asia and Australia, appearing in festivals, on radio and television, and in concert, including one of several headlining spots at Summer Sonic Festival 2012. In September, he appeared on the first season finale of The Voice of China, the country's most popular program. Lambert joined Queen for a six concert date collaboration tour, kicking off with a two-hour extravaganza under the auspices of the UEFA in Kyiv on June 30, the eve of the Euro 2012 Football Championship. Viewed live by hundreds of thousands in Ukraine's main square, the performance was touted for the strength of Lambert's showmanship, vocal excellence and interpretative skill, which confidently balanced old and new. Almost uniformly, reviews noted Lambert's vocals, his "sizzle" and "electrifying" presence; along with the synergy of the collaboration, which Queen guitarist Brian May called "organic".

Lambert's third single, "Trespassing", was released as part of an eight track EP of remixes that included a radio edit of the original song. Entitled Trespassing Remixes, it became available to radio and digital outlets in October, with hard copies sold from his official website only. "Trespassing" debuted at number one on the Billboard Hot Dance Singles Sales chart, giving Lambert his tenth number one Billboard entry. On October 23, Lambert acted and performed two songs from Trespassing in the Halloween special of the television series Pretty Little Liars.

Lambert appeared for the first time in South Africa in November, headlining arena concerts in Cape Town and Johannesburg. South Africa's The Sunday Times called Lambert's Johannesburg performance "epic" and "electrifying", stating: "His voice is stunning and his entertainment factor is through the roof." Later that month he was in Hong Kong delivering a "powerful performance" at the 2012 Mnet Asian Music Awards (2012 MAMA).

The album Trespassing was rewarded in year end lists and polls, among them best album of the year at Rolling Stone, number three at Billboard for "Favorite 200 No.1" albums, and number eight on People magazine's list of "Top Ten Music" in its year end issue. Queen + Adam Lambert was named best live act of 2012 at Gigwise, and one of Classic Rock magazine's top events of the year.

Lambert left 19 Recordings when his contract expired, but remained with RCA Records. On February 17, the newly dubbed We Are Glamily Tour kicked off in Seoul, with seventeen stops throughout Asia and Europe. His first solo concert in Hong Kong on March 5 was noted for the live debut of two songs, "Time for Miracles" and a cover of Tears for Fears' "Shout", called "stunning" and vocally impressive.

Lambert won the "Favorite International Artist" category at the STAR TV 17th Chinese Music Awards held in Macau in April, also performing two songs from Trespassing. Lambert also appeared as a guest judge during auditions on Chinese Idol. On May 11, Lambert for his album Trespassing along with Frank Ocean for Channel Orange were co-recipients of the GLAAD Media Award for Outstanding Music Artist at the 24th GLAAD Media Awards. He returned to American Idol on May 16 for the fourth consecutive year, performing a duet with Angie Miller on the twelfth season finale, where Miller was a finalist in the top three. The pair tackled the song "Titanium".

In a letter sent to The Hollywood Reporter on July 12, Lambert revealed that he would be leaving RCA due to "creative differences" centering most directly on his next release. With RCA "pushing" for a covers album, Lambert stated: "my heart is simply not in doing a covers album... I am already deep into writing new material with some very talented colleagues for a brand new album, and I can't tell you how excited I am to share this new sound and direction. This music is where my heart is."

Lambert unveiled a collaboration with Nile Rodgers and DJ-producer Avicii when the three appeared onstage together for the track's US debut at an August benefit concert on Long Island. The song, entitled "Lay Me Down", released on Avicii's debut album True on September 17 in the US, though it had already begun climbing charts worldwide. It received wide acclaim in previews, and landed at number one on a compilation of Rolling Stone's favorite songs, albums and videos.

Lambert and Queen made their first live concert appearance in the United States, closing the night on September 20, at the 2013 iHeartRadio Music Festival at the MGM Grand Arena. Reviews for the performance were stellar, with Rolling Stone stating that they dominated night one, also calling them most anticipated act of the evening, with Lambert "astound[ing] the audience." Billboard was equally laudatory, remarking on the "magnetic power" of the vocals, adding that Lambert "oozed charisma".

Lambert made his debut on the fifth season of Glee on November 7, playing the role of Elliot "Starchild" Gilbert in what became a multi-episode arc. His rendition of Lady Gaga's "Marry the Night" was released prior to air date, garnering publicity and positive reviews. Accolades for Lambert's debut spotlighted his powerful vocals and dynamic presence. His remake of "Marry the Night" impacted Billboard the following week, debuting at number 39 on the Pop Digital Songs chart.

Lambert was in attendance to receive two awards at China's Huading Awards: Best International Male Vocalist and the Fan Choice Award, on December 18 in Shanghai. Lambert tied at number three on Forbes annual list of top earning American Idols, due to his live performances and other endeavors.

=== 2014–2018: The Original High and Queen + Adam Lambert ===
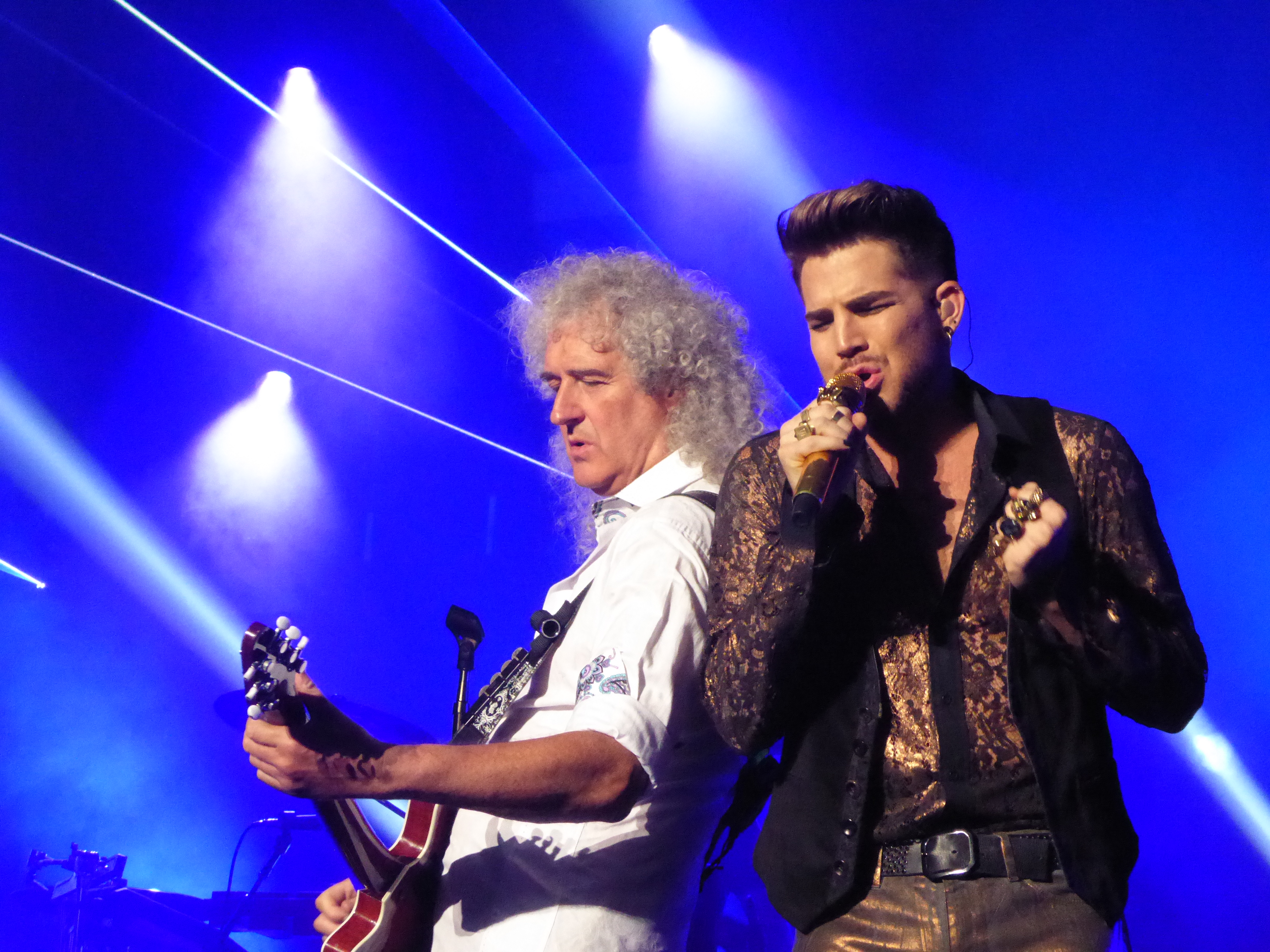
Lambert and May on the Queen + Adam Lambert tour 2014

In February 2014, Lambert returned to American Idol, where he was a guest mentor on the thirteenth season during Randy Jackson's two-night "Boot Camp" workshop. He was a guest judge on the season 6 premiere of RuPaul's Drag Race the following week. Glee returned on February 25 with the episode "Frenemies" featuring Lambert in a performance of The Darkness's "I Believe in a Thing Called Love".

On May 27, 2014, a compilation album The Very Best of Adam Lambert was released by Sony Legacy's Playlist series, featuring recordings from Lambert's two studio albums along with studio recordings from American Idol and Glee. It debuted on the Billboard Top Internet Albums chart at number 14.

Lambert started touring with Roger Taylor and Brian May of Queen in June 2014, with 35 dates in North America, Korea, Japan, Australia and New Zealand. The Queen + Adam Lambert Tour 2014–2015 was a critical and commercial success, as reviews highlighted the musical virtuosity of May and Taylor, alongside Lambert's impressive vocal dexterity, charisma and affinity with Queen's repertoire – all augmented by the elaborate spectacle of the production. In 2015, a second leg of eleven countries and 26 dates in Europe and the UK was performed. On November 4, Queen + Adam Lambert was named Band of the Year at the 10th annual Classic Rock Roll of Honour Awards. Following a much reviewed "soaring" performance on the UK's The X Factor, Lambert and Queen presented an exclusive New Year's Eve concert in London at Central Hall Westminster, Queen + Adam Lambert Rock Big Ben Live. The praised concert was called "pitch-perfect". In January, Queen + Adam Lambert appeared on the cover of Classic Rock magazine; he was applauded in the cover story by Taylor and May, who called him "a gift from God". In September, Queen and Lambert headlined Rock in Rio's "30 Years Celebration" in Brazil, as part of a six date South American tour. The tour was a critical success; and their Rock in Rio performance was the seven-day festival's most popular, based on ticket sales.

On January 15, 2015, Lambert became the first former contestant to appear as a guest judge on American Idol at the fourteenth season's New York City auditions, filling in for Keith Urban. That same day, Lambert revealed in a Billboard interview that he signed to Warner Bros. Records within twenty-four hours after announcing his departure from RCA. He further stated that his upcoming studio release, scheduled for early summer with a single out in April, would be executive produced by the Swedish songwriter-producers Max Martin and Shellback.

Promotion for the new album, The Original High, began with a series of magazine cover stories, television appearances and teasers of the lead single, "Ghost Town", prior to its release on April 21, 2015. Also notable was "Ghost Town"'s performance at the 2015 Logo Trailblazer Honors; and its performance in early August on Australia's The Voice. Spin named it one of 2015's best songs so far; and The New York Times stated it "was perhaps his best single to date." "Ghost Town" entered the Billboard Hot 100 at number 73, and charted on the Billboard Adult Top 40. It reached 100 million Spotify streams in early December 2015 and was certified gold in the US on January 15, 2016. The Original High debuted at number three on the Billboard 200 selling 42,000 albums and moving 47,000 total units, including track and streaming equivalent albums. Lambert garnered his first top ten album in the United Kingdom, with a number eight debut on the UK Albums Chart. As with "Ghost Town", reviews were largely positive. The Original High Tour commenced in January 2016 with six dates in Australia and New Zealand and seven dates in Japan.

On August 29, Lambert received the award for Best Foreign Artist at the 2015 Eska Music Awards held in Szczecin, Poland. On the 30th, he made his first UK festival appearance, performing a set at Fusion Festival UK 2015 in Birmingham.

In early October, Lambert released "Another Lonely Night". It debuted live as the new single at 538LIVE XXL at the Ziggo Dome in Amsterdam, and a few days later on X Factor Australia. Twenty dates were then added to The Original High Tour to include thirteen European countries; RedFestDXB, a two-day music festival, in Dubai; and two dates in China. The tour commenced at No. Celebrate2016 in The Float at Marina Bay, Singapore on December 31, 2015. In November, an online petition supported by conservative groups was launched to remove Lambert from the Singapore program, citing his controversial performance at the AMA's in 2009, and active support for LGBT rights. He was not removed from the headlining spot, but it was reiterated that his performance would conform to strict broadcast regulations.

Throughout the fall, Lambert continued appearances in the US, Europe and Asia. Notable performances included Today, Swedish Idol, The Voice of Poland and BBC One's Strictly Come Dancing, as a musical guest. After participating in a Billboard news conference in Beijing announcing the inclusion of China in its music charts, he was the guest performer at Alibaba's Singles' Day event. On December 2, he performed at the CMT "Artists of the Year" special to honor Little Big Town and their controversial song "Girl Crush" in a duet with Leona Lewis. The performance was nominated for "Performance of the Year" at the 2016 CMT Music Awards.

Lambert received several year end accolades, among them a number one in Forbes yearly earnings ranking of American Idol contestants; and the top spot in Rolling Stone's "The Ten Best Albums of 2015" readers' poll, with the publication noting his "vocals are as massive as his performances." In January 2016, twenty-three US dates were added to The Original High Tour, bringing it to 56 dates worldwide. In mid-January, Lambert partnered with Oreo to launch a diversity focused global ad campaign, "Open Up", featuring his vocals in an animated spot. In February, he featured in the finale tribute to David Bowie at Clive Davis and The Recording Academy's pre-Grammy event. In March, he debuted "Welcome to the Show" on the fifteenth season of American Idol. The next week, the DJ produced Steve Aoki and Felix Jaehn track "Can't Go Home" debuted, with Lambert as the featured vocalist.

In May 2016, Lambert became the new face of Macy's lifestyle brand, I.N.C. International Concepts, and a participant in its "American Icons" summer campaign.

Queen + Adam Lambert headlined Rock in Rio Lisbon, Sweden Rock Festival, Isle of Wight Festival, and twelve more European festivals and shows in May and June 2016 as part of their Queen + Adam Lambert 2016 Summer Festival Tour. In September, they headlined the 2016 Formula 1 Singapore Grand Prix, performed one date in Tel Aviv, three dates in Tokyo, and one each in Bangkok, Hong Kong, Shanghai and Taipei as part of an Asia Tour. In June, Lambert joined the judging panel for the eighth season of The X Factor Australia to replace James Blunt.

Lambert released his first independent, self-produced music video in July to accompany "Welcome to the Show". He performed a cover of George Michael's "Faith" on the season finale of Greatest Hits in August. Lambert is featured on the single "Broken", released in August by DJ/producers Tritonal in collaboration with producer Jenaux.

In October, Lambert co-starred in The Rocky Horror Picture Show: Let's Do the Time Warp Again, the television remake of The Rocky Horror Picture Show. The X Factor Australia wrapped its 2016 season in November, with Isaiah Firebrace, a contestant of Lambert's team declared the winner. In December, he performed a duet with finalist Saara Aalto on thirteenth series finale of The X Factor, and presented the award for British Artist of the Year on the 2016 BBC Music Awards live telecast. Lambert featured on the soundtrack album of DreamWorks Animation's Captain Underpants: The First Epic Movie with a cover of Aretha Franklin's "Think", released in June 2017.

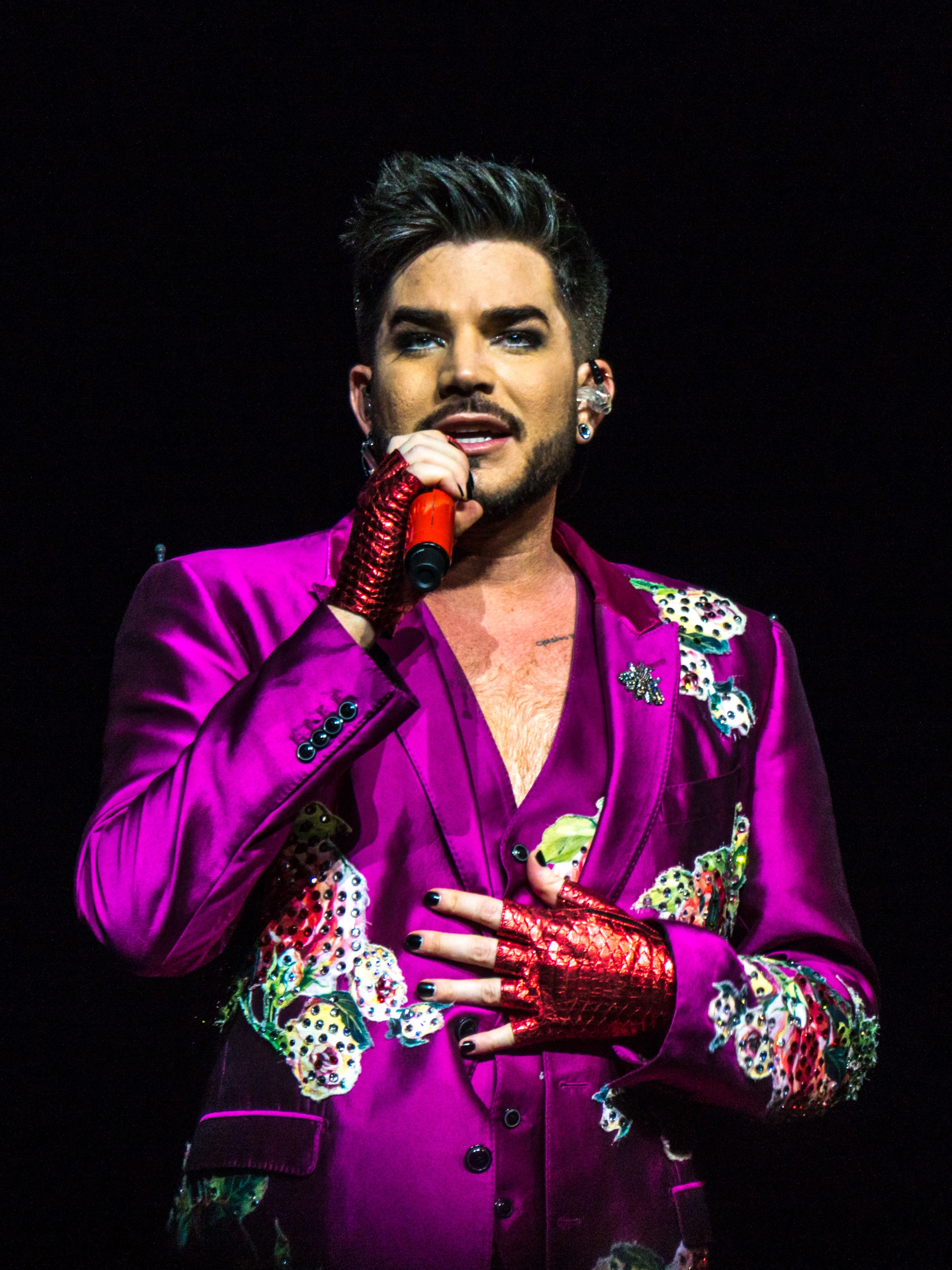
Lambert performing with Queen + Adam Lambert in 2017.

Queen + Adam Lambert commenced a worldwide arena tour on June 23, 2017, in Glendale, Arizona consisting of dates in North America, Europe, Australia and New Zealand. The group appeared on The Late Late Show with James Corden with Lambert and James Corden having a sing-off to be the Queen frontman. Lambert and Queen performed a mini-concert on Jimmy Kimmel Live!, with a four-song set list that included the debut of a new track from Lambert entitled "Two Fux". Early reviews for the shows were strongly positive, highlighting both the synergy of the collaboration, which Billboard stated was perhaps the most "serendipitous fusion of two established recording acts" since Fleetwood Mac; and the emergence of something new, moving the band forward.

"Two Fux" was released to digital retailers on June 30, with reviews that were similarly positive: Yahoo! Music called it "a delightfully attitudinal rock 'n' roll waltz" exhibiting a highly confident "almost superhuman" Lambert. Esquire stated the song was "effervescent, and a showcase for the nosebleed-inducing heights his falsetto can scale; it also serves as the conflation of Queen's influence and Lambert's own experiences and perspective." "Two Fux" is included in the Queen + Adam Lambert live show set list.

Lambert appeared as guest judge and musical coach on an episode of the third season of RuPaul's Drag Race: All Stars. Due to its success, the Queen + Adam Lambert tour announced a fourth leg to commence June 7 in Lisbon, ending July 8 in Dublin. In March, Billboard reported that Queen + Adam Lambert topped their "Hot Tours" recap, with their Australian shows.

In May, Lambert teamed up with Melissa Etheridge to open the 29th GLAAD Media Awards with a "ripping" performance of Etheridges's song "I'm the Only One". Days later, he appeared on Live with Kelly and Ryan, announcing a 10-date Las Vegas residency for Queen + Adam Lambert in September 2018, at the Park Theater at Park MGM. The new production, titled "The Crown Jewels", was well received. Lambert changed management to Philymack.

Lambert was a guest judge in the "Judges' Houses" segment on the fifteenth series of The X Factor in October. He performed the duet "As Long as You're Mine" with Ledisi on NBC's A Very Wicked Halloween, commemorating Wicked's fifteen years on Broadway. The performance was lauded for its brilliant harmonies and "impressive vocal riffs," and later released on Wicked: The 15th Anniversary Special Edition album. On December 2, he appeared on the results show of the sixteenth series's Musicals Week of Strictly Come Dancing, singing "We Are the Champions", from We Will Rock You. On the same date, he performed live at the Kennedy Center Honors in support of honoree Cher, singing "I Got You Babe" with Cyndi Lauper and an orchestral ballad version of "Believe", called an "event high point" by The Washington Post. Following the ceremony's broadcast on December 26, Lambert's performance was widely praised.

=== 2019–2022: Velvet and Queen + Adam Lambert ===
Lambert appeared with James Corden on The Late Late Show on January 20, 2019, for an NFL themed episode, singing a parody of "Don't Stop Me Now". On February 17, he performed a well-reviewed "rocking" version of "Blue Suede Shoes" on NBC's Elvis All-Star Tribute, a recreation of Elvis Presley's '68 Comeback Special.

Lambert voiced the character Emperor Maximus and sang original songs for Playmobil: The Movie, a combination animated live-action film released in 2019. On December 3, Queen and Adam Lambert announced a 23-date arena and stadium tour with a brand new production for North America. The Rhapsody Tour added additional dates in New York City and Los Angeles; at 25 dates the tour ran from July 10 through August 23, 2019.

Lambert released the song "Feel Something" on February 22, called an "achingly yearning ballad" by Rolling Stone that "showcases [his] acrobatic vocal range." Co-written with Benedict Cork, Josh Cumbee and produced by Cumbee and Afshin Salmani, it was the first track revealed from the singer's then-upcoming fourth studio album Velvet, which was released through the independent label Empire. Calling the song "a gift" to fans and the launch of a new era prior to his official first single, Lambert explained via Instagram the process by which he emerged from a dark period of second-guessing, compromise and disillusionment - with "Feel Something" the emotional starting point for his new work. Days later he released a "captivating" live studio performance of "Feel Something", whose beauty and soothing tone capture the song's intent.

On February 24, 2019, Lambert and Queen were the first rock band to open the 91st Academy Awards with an "explosive" performance of two classic Queen songs in honor of the film Bohemian Rhapsody that earned a standing ovation. The following day, they announced a two-hour documentary, The Show Must Go On: The Queen + Adam Lambert Story, depicting the journey of their ongoing collaboration. The film aired on ABC in April, offering rare behind-the-scenes concert footage and new interviews. Roger Taylor appeared on Good Morning America the same morning, calling the collaboration with Lambert "magical", and an example of "fate unfolding". On April 28, Lambert guest mentored the seventeenth season's top 8 finalists on American Idol's Queen-themed night, and was praised for actionable advice that elevated performances. In April 2019, The Rhapsody Tour expanded to include seven stadium dates in Australia and three in New Zealand, slated for February 2020; four shows in Japan and two in South Korea, for January 2020; and 26 shows in Europe including a ten show residency at The O2 Arena in London.

On May 15, 2019, Lambert released "New Eyes", the lead single from his fourth studio album Velvet, co-written with Paris Carney and produced by Jamie Sierota. The "effortlessly cool, sleek" song fuses modern and classic rock, while its video reflects the song's lyrics and 1970s-inspired aesthetic. Directed by Miles & AJ, the video was the first part of a short film that accompanied the lead-up to the album release. Lambert returned to American Idol for its May 19 season finale to perform "New Eyes" and a duet of Bohemian Rhapsody with contestant Dimitrius Graham. On May 31, he performed "New Eyes" on The Ellen DeGeneres Show and again on June 24 on the eighth season finale of The Voice Australia.

Lambert released The Monarch-produced track "Comin in Hot" on June 26, along with the second video installment of the short film supporting Velvet. The video was called "bewitching" and "mesmerizing", and the song said to extend the '70s rock-driven sound of the album's first single. Lambert revealed that Velvet would be released in two parts, with Side A slated for September 2019. "Comin In Hot" saw its broadcast debut on June 28 when Lambert performed a five-song set and was interviewed on Good Morning America's Summer Concert Series, in celebration of Pride month and WorldPride NYC 2019.

On September 4, Lambert released the single and video for "Superpower", appearing on Velvet: Side A, the first half of his fourth studio album. The Tommy English produced song was co-written by Lambert, English and Ilsey Juber, with video direction by Millient Hailes. Its weighty baseline and "smooth falsettos" reflect the '70s rock, funk-heavy core of the multi-genre album, which was released on September 27. Billboard called the 6 track EP his "best work yet", exuding confidence and raw vocal power. His proficiency and artistry across genres was also noted. He performed "Superpower" live on October 2 on Live with Kelly and Ryan, and for Halloween week of BBC One's Strictly Come Dancing. On the 12th, he delivered a "show-stopping" performance of "Superpower" on The Talk. On October 15, a live black-and-white video version of the track "Closer to You" from Velvet: Side A was released, lauded as "a vocal masterclass". Its broadcast debut on The Late Late Show with James Corden was highly praised, characterized as "scaling the song's heights with pop operatic virtuosity."

On September 28, Lambert with Queen headlined the 2019 Global Citizen Festival in New York City's Central Park. Dedicated to mobilizing world governments to eradicate extreme poverty and address climate change, the festival posted its best ratings yet: with 60,000 in attendance and nearly 21 million views worldwide, it generated close to $1 billion in pledges.

In November, Lambert released a cover of "Please Come Home for Christmas" for the Spotify Singles: Holiday Collection. He was among several performers at the Avicii tribute concert at Friends Arena in Stockholm on December 5, to support suicide prevention and promote mental health awareness. On December 6, Lambert released a cover of Cher's "Believe" based on his 2018 performance at the Kennedy Center Honors. He performed the song as a duet with Katie Kadan on the December 17 finale of the seventeenth season of The Voice. On December 22, he performed on the CBS special A Home for the Holidays Christmas special to raise awareness about adoption and the foster care system. Lambert gave four well received solo concerts throughout December to promote Velvet: Side A.

In January 2020, Lambert was nominated for a GLAAD Media Award in the Outstanding Music Artist category for Velvet: Side A. Lambert opened the 31st GLAAD Media Awards with a special performance on March 19 in New York City. On February 16 in Sydney, Lambert with Queen performed at the Fire Fight Australia concert to raise funds for relief from Australia's bushfires and replicated Queen's 1985 Live Aid set in its entirety.

On February 4, 2020, Lambert released the retro-funk track "Roses" featuring Nile Rodgers. The Velvet Tour began on August 3 at Manchester Pride, followed by London's SSE Arena Wembley and seven more shows across Europe. The tour was preceded by a mini-residence of five shows at The Venetian Theatre at The Venetian Las Vegas in April.

Lambert with Queen united virtually on April 30 to release "You Are the Champions", a reimagining of "We Are the Champions", on streaming and download services, with proceeds going to the World Health Organization's COVID-19 Solidarity Response Fund. In May, Lambert was part of a 3-day livestream event called "Stronger Than You Think", a conversation to address mental health issues affecting teens and young adults, particularly during the COVID-19 pandemic. In June, he appeared on The Late Late Show with James Corden to discuss his support and experience of the Black Lives Matter movement, and gave an acoustic performance of "On the Moon" from Velvet. Lambert participated in the Grammy Museum's virtual Programs at Home, with an in-depth interview and acoustic four song set. In July, in support of Joe Biden's presidential bid, he performed "Ready to Run" at Biden's live-streaming fundraiser "Celebration for Change".

Queen with Lambert released their first album on October 2, 2020, Live Around the World. Debuting at number one on the UK's Official Albums Chart, it was followed by a concert film of the same name on January 29, 2021, with tour footage and streaming or purchase access. The group announced that their United Kingdom and European tour would be postponed a second time to 2022 with multiple shows subsequently added.

In November, the comedy television series Moonbase 8 debuted, with Lambert in a non-musical guest acting role. Lambert sang "Starman" for the three-hour livestream event, "A Bowie Celebration", on what would have been David Bowie's 74th birthday. He played the role of "Emile" in Ratatouille the Musical, a first of its kind collaboration between TikTok and the theater community. What emerged was a full Broadway-style musical, streamed on January 1, raising two million dollars for The Actors Fund, and scoring a Drama League Award nomination in an expanded digital category. Lambert sang on the concept recording of Cinderella, "rocking out" in his Prince Charming solo. The album was released in July, and debuted at number one on the UK Official Compilations Chart, later garnering a 2022 Grammy nomination for Best Musical Theater Album as the 64th Annual Grammy Awards.

Lambert was supposed to perform during a North American summer tour with Christina Aguilera throughout 2020. These plans were ultimately cancelled due to the COVID-19 pandemic.

Lambert, through his Feel Something Foundation in partnership with Pride Live, curated and headlined a three-day festival, the annual June Stonewall Day global celebration, to boost and preserve the legacy of the Stonewall riots and LGBTQ activism. He appeared on The Kelly Clarkson Show on January 26, and discussed the possibility of developing his own beauty brand. In March 2021, Lambert revealed that he was writing a Broadway-style rock and roll stage musical in collaboration with other songwriters. Set in the 1970s, the work will be about a real person; and represents his intent to expand into other creative spaces like acting and producing.

Lambert sang "These Are Your Rights", an "anthemic power ballad", for the episode "The Bill of Rights" in We the People released on July fourth. In September, he participated in Global Citizen Live, a worldwide 24-hour broadcast and livestream event to defeat poverty and address the global effects of the COVID-19 pandemic. In May he appeared as a guest judge on the second season of Legendary. Lambert appeared on The Ellen DeGeneres Show in advance of his role as a judge on the reality competition Clash of the Cover Bands, that debuted in October.

He voiced The Devil on the animated series A Tale Dark & Grimm, that also debuted in fall 2021. He returned to Las Vegas for six solo shows at The Venetian Theatre at The Venetian Las Vegas in October. In November, Lambert performed on The Queen Family Singalong. On The Kelly Clarkson Show, he performed the duet he recorded with Darren Criss for Criss' holiday album A Very Darren Crissmas, "(Everybody's Waitin' for) The Man with the Bag"; a music video of the track was released the following day. Lambert performed two songs to close the 2021 ITV Palooza event; and appeared as a judge on the talent show Starstruck, that debuted on February 12.

Lambert performed on the second annual global livestream event, "Rise Up With The Arts", which went live on World Theatre Day, March 27. In response to the Russo-Ukrainian War, funds raised were designated for Save the Children's emergency appeal for Ukraine, as well as to support the theater community and the charity "icandance". Lambert headlined the April 30 show of SunFest music festival in West Palm Beach, Florida; later he announced four more Florida solo shows plus one in Georgia, unofficially dubbing the dates the "Say Gay" tour in response to Florida's recently enacted "Don't Say Gay" bill.

Queen and Lambert began the European leg of The Rhapsody Tour on May 27 and concluded on July 25. On June 4, they opened the Platinum Party at the Palace with a three-song set outside Buckingham Palace, in honor of Elizabeth II's Platinum Jubilee.

Lambert appeared in the film Fairyland that debuted at the 2023 Sundance Film Festival in January 2023. Lambert received an award from the Creative Coalition's Spotlight Initiative, whose awards ceremony gala took place during Sundance. He returned to Las Vegas in October for the Halloween themed concert series "The Witch Hunt", consisting of three shows at the Encore at Wynn Las Vegas; five California dates were subsequently added to the mini tour that concluded with a livestreamed show at the Hollywood Palladium on October 30. Lambert returned to Warner Music Group with global representation on East West Records. His first single release on the label was a cover of Noël Coward's "Mad About the Boy" that would feature in a documentary about Coward of the same name released in 2023. Lambert debuted the track with an "amazing" live performance on the twentieth series of Strictly Come Dancing. Also in October he performed two duets with Jennifer Hudson, including the aria "Nessun dorma", on The Jennifer Hudson Show.

=== 2023–2024: High Drama, Queen + Adam Lambert, The Voice Australia and Singer 2024 ===
In February Lambert released his fifth studio album, High Drama, a collection of cover songs. It debuted at number five on the UK Albums Chart, marking his first solo entry in the UK Official Charts top ten. Its number seven debut on Billboard's Top Albums Sales chart was his fifth top ten entry in this category. The video and song, "Ordinary World", was released and was called "haunting" in its sound. The song debuted with a performance on the twenty-second season finale of The Voice that Lambert dedicated to the victims of the November shootings at the LGBTQ+ Club Q. Lambert was a judge on Britain Get Singing, a televised celebrity singing competition in support of mental health. He debuted High Drama's secong single, "a glam-rock makeover" of "Holding Out for a Hero", on The National Lottery's Big Bash end-of-year special held at Ovo Arena Wembley, televised on New Year's Eve. On December 17, he performed on The Jonathan Ross Show's Christmas episode. He performed a "show-stopping" version of "Chandelier" from High Drama on America's Got Talent: All-Stars February 27 finale with the season's winner. Lambert held a one-off album launch show at London's KOKO concert venue on February 27. He began a series of solo concert dates in June, beginning with Royal Albert Hall in London. In early March, he performed on The Tonight Show Starring Jimmy Fallon, Good Morning America, The View and Australian Idol; and was interviewed for a Nightline segment. On April 17, he appeared on That's My Jam and performed an "hysterical and impressive" version of "The Muffin Man" as Cher that went viral.

Queen + Adam Lambert expanded The Rhapsody Tour, adding 22 dates in North America starting in October in Baltimore and finishing in Los Angeles in November. They headlined the last night of the Formula 1 Lenovo United States Grand Prix in October at Circuit of the Americas in Austin, Texas. In February 2024, they will perform five mega dome concerts in Japan.

Lambert returned to American Idol on April 30 to mentor the top twelve of twenty-first season on a Rock and Roll Hall of Fame themed night; also performing "I Can't Stand the Rain", praised for its "glam magic". He performed at Capital Summertime Ball in Wembley Stadium on June 11; and at the amfAR Gala on May 25, an annual event to benefit AIDS research, held during the Cannes Film Festival. On June 30, he received the Silver Clef Award for international artist at the Nordoff and Robbins awards ceremony. The latter is a charitable organization that raises money to train music therapists to work with populations with largely mental health disabilities.

Noting that Pride seemed "more important now than ever", Lambert had an active Pride season. To kick off Pride Month, on June 1 he hosted a live discussion with military service members and their spouses. He headlined London Pride on July 1, having released the cover single, "You Make Me Feel (Mighty Real)" with Sigala, named the official song of London Pride. In honor of Pride Month, he collaborated with Orly beauty to release a nail polish collection, the "Adam Lambert x Orly: High Drama Collection", with proceeds going to the non-profit "Stand With Trans" in support of trans youth and their families. Lambert's "Feel Something Foundation" collaborated with MusiCares and BMG to host a panel Care/Feel that addressed the intersection of mental health and "queer" identity in the music industry, moderated by Lambert.

ITV announced that Lambert will create a documentary focused on queer music history and the experience of LGBTQ+ artists as they navigate the music industry. His own perspective will be explored in the program, Loud: An Adam Lambert Documentary. On December 8, Lambert performed at Princess Catherine's "Together at Christmas" special at Westminster Abbey. The program, airing Christmas Eve, is in support of early child development efforts as part of the Princess's "Shaping Us" awareness campaign. He will be a judge on Britain Get Singing, a Christmas special in support of ITV's mental health campaign Britain Get Talking.

In February 2024, it was announced that Lambert would be featured as a judge on the thirteenth season of The Voice Australia, alongside Guy Sebastian, Kate Miller-Heidke, and LeAnn Rimes. In March, he voiced a character and sang the theme song for Megamind Rules!. Additionally, he voiced a character for the second season of Apple TV+'s original series Fraggle Rock: Back to the Rock, singing a reimagined version of a series original "Free and High".

In May 2024, Lambert was a guest performer on the ninth season of Singer, a singing competition for professional singers.

=== 2024–2025: Afters EP and return to musical theatre ===
On July 19, 2024, Lambert independently released the six-track EP Afters through his label, More Is More. Influenced by electronic dance music and queer nightlife, the project explores sexuality, liberation and after-hours hedonism across the tracks "Lube", "Wet Dream", "CVNTY", "Face", "Deep House" and "Neck". Lambert characterised Afters as a more uninhibited and explicitly queer release than his previous work, reflecting his increased confidence in pushing artistic and sexual boundaries.

In July 2024, it was announced that Lambert would make his Broadway debut in the role of Emcee in the musical Cabaret, alongside Auliʻi Cravalho in the role of Sally Bowles beginning September 16. Describing the performance in PAPER magazine as a return to his theatrical roots, Lambert called it a "full-circle moment" that allowed him to revisit the career path he had pursued before his recording career. The New York Times praised the emotional range of his performance. In February 2025, Lambert addressed a viral incident in which he reprimanded an audience member for laughing during an antisemitic scene in Cabaret, telling them, "This isn't comedy. Pay attention." Lambert's response was subsequently praised online. In an interview with People, he said the musical remained "very relevant" due to its themes of intolerance and social exclusion.

In August 2025, Lambert portrayed Judas Iscariot opposite Cynthia Erivo as Jesus in a three-performance concert production of Jesus Christ Superstar at the Hollywood Bowl, directed and choreographed by Sergio Trujillo. His performance received positive reviews, with The Guardian describing him as "magnetic" and praising the intensity he brought to Judas's moral conflict and despair.

=== 2026: Adam ===
On July 10, 2026, Lambert released his sixth studio album, Adam, independently through his label, More Is More, with distribution by The Orchard. It was preceded by the singles "Eat U Alive", "Under the Rhythm" and "Cloud 9", and drew inspiration from the alternative rock, electronic and pop music of the 1990s and early 2000s.

Lambert promoted the album through appearances and performances including The Kelly Clarkson Show, Today, The View, and BBC's The One Show, as well as several podcast interviews including The Zane Lowe Show,David Begnaud's The Person Who Believed in Me podcast, Acast's Fashion Radio, and And The Writer Is...with Ross Golan. Lambert also staged album release concerts, including performances at The Bellwether, Brooklyn Paramount, Roundhouse, Mohegan Sun Arena and Huxleys Neue Welt.

Lambert performed at the 2026 MTV Video Music Awards as part of the George Michael tribute medley alongside Sombr, Raye and Teddy Swims.

== Artistry ==
=== Voice ===
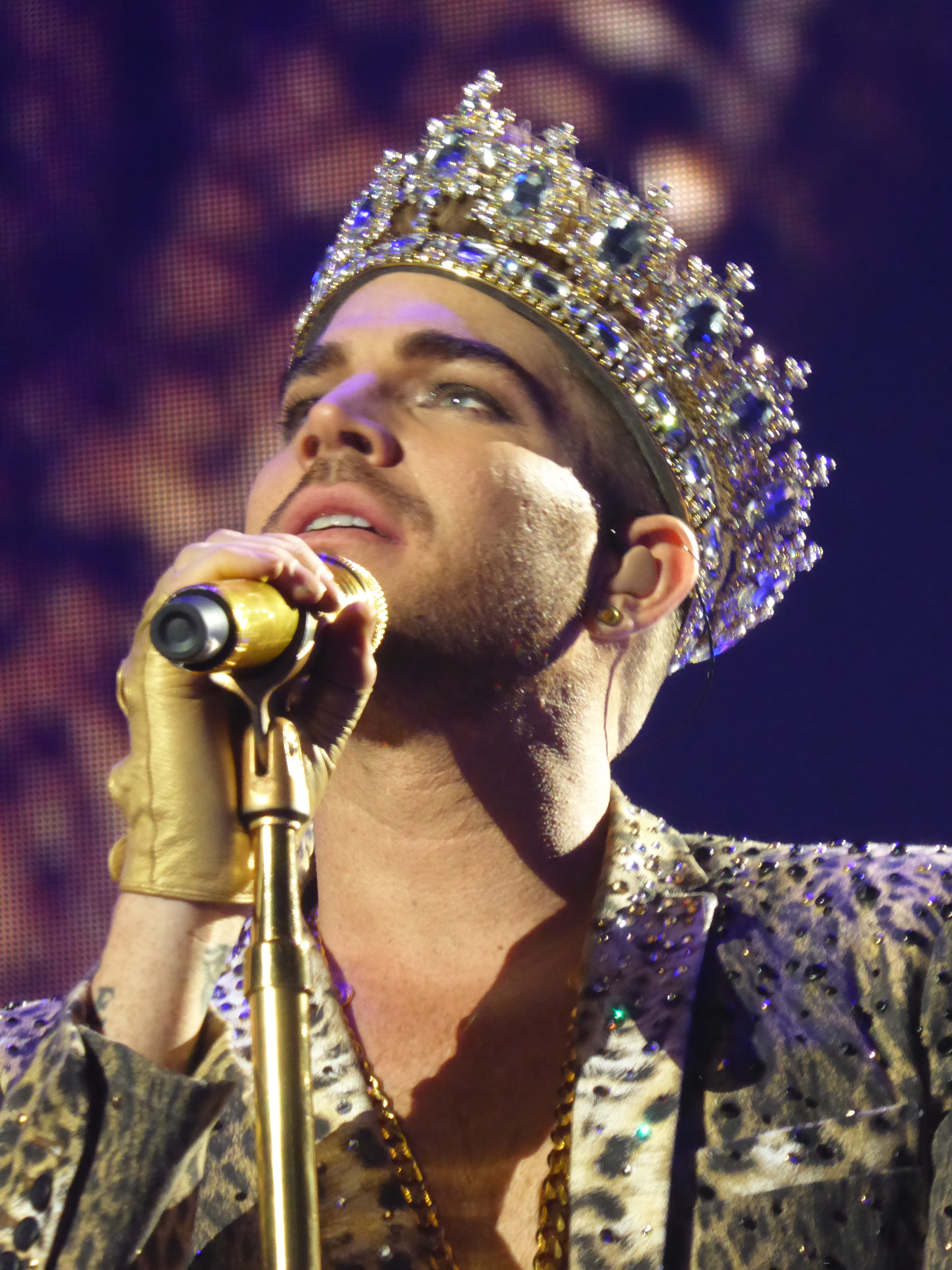
Lambert performing with Queen in Toronto (2014)

Critics, celebrities and colleagues have been outspoken in their praise for Lambert's vocal command. Kathie Bretches-Urban, co-founder of Metropolitan Educational Theatre Network (now MET2) where Lambert performed as a youth, said "He has invested his entire life in music and performing ... He'd just come out onstage, and it popped." Record producer Rob Cavallo once described Lambert as having an unlimited range and able to sing every note on a guitar from the lowest to the highest. In a March 2012 interview, rock artist Meat Loaf rated Lambert's voice in the company of only two others, Whitney Houston and Aretha Franklin, based on "that jet pack quality to their voice that just lets it take off."

In 2011, when he took the stage at the MTV Europe Music Awards, honoree Queen guitarist Brian May noted that Lambert's voice has "sensitivity, depth, maturity, and awesome range and power which will make jaws drop"; while Roger Taylor added that Lambert had "the best range I've ever heard" in a BBC interview in 2012. Pharrell Williams, after collaborating with Lambert on his Trespassing album, commented, "This kid has a voice like a siren – there's no guys singing in that Steve Winwood-Peter Cetera range."

In October 2012, the Sunday Mirror reported that Lambert insured his voice for $48 million. A source told the tabloid newspaper: "Insurance for stars is a big deal in the US and Adam's voice is his bacon."

In a 2019 interview James Michael, lead vocalist for the band Sixx:A.M., praised Lambert's vocal technique, power and the facility of his vocal control - judging him one of the best vocalists in the world.

=== Style and image ===
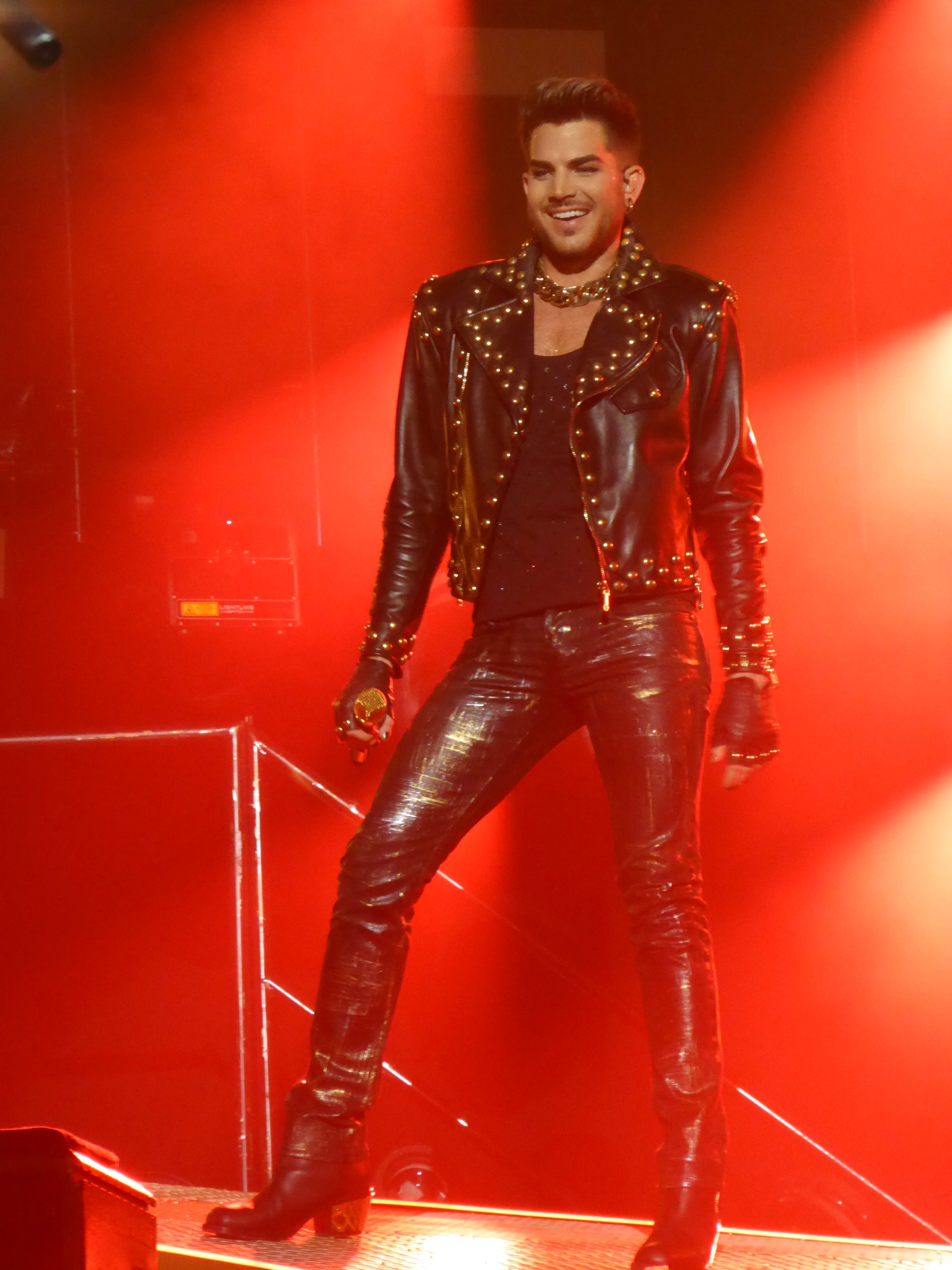
Lambert performing with Queen in Las Vegas (2014)

Lambert is best known for his theatrical performance style and meticulous attention to detail in all aspects of his personal presentation. He draws upon extensive stage experience in the ease with which he can refine and define his image through fashion and other imagery, which are essential to how he chooses to inhabit his songs, rivet his audiences and showcase his individuality. While a contestant on American Idol, Lambert's precise yet varied stagings of himself kept audiences and judges glued as much to his presentation as to his vocal talent. His signature flamboyance and glam rock styling was a break-out moment in men's fashion, duly noted by fashion publications and taste-makers, who compared him to Lady Gaga in terms of crossing style boundaries and being unabashedly individual.

Lambert made three fashion related TV appearances at the close of 2010. He fused his passion for music and fashion on MTV's "Talk@Playground", appearing in discussion with Skingraft designer Jonny Cota. He was a guest judge on Project Runway in an episode that styled a rock band for their upcoming Rolling Stone cover. He was the subject for whom the young designers of "All on the Line with Joe Zee" created a modern look, which he then critiqued along with the show's hosts.

Lambert continued to grace the covers of magazines, moving more specifically into the fashion and culture space. Reflecting the mood and concept behind his album Trespassing, the Fault Magazine fashion shoot exemplified Lambert's commitment to aligning the elements of his artistic vision so that a cohesive narrative emerges. When Lambert appeared on the December 2012 cover of London-based high style magazine Fiasco's "Obsession" issue, he again took the opportunity to manipulate and provoke with his image and style. Sporting a sophisticated, minimalist look that recalled old Hollywood, Lambert played with male stereotypes and representations; and in the interview, emphasized that his fashion and presentation are often disparate from gay as well as straight regimes: "For the general audience, they look at the way I style myself and they go, 'Errrr, that's gay', but you ask a handful of gay guys and they're like, 'I would never wear that!'"

In August 2015, he was one of four artists to appear on the cover of Billboard's "Music's Men of Style" issue. He discussed his natural shift towards a cleaner, more classic look; and reiterated that the intersection of music and fashion—the constant motion of trends—is a fascination and part of being a pop musician.

Lambert is represented by London-based MiLK Management modeling agency as of July 2016.

=== Influences ===
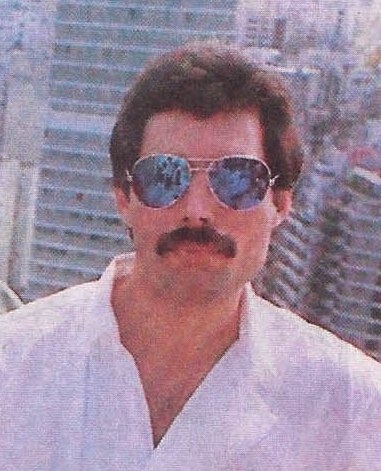
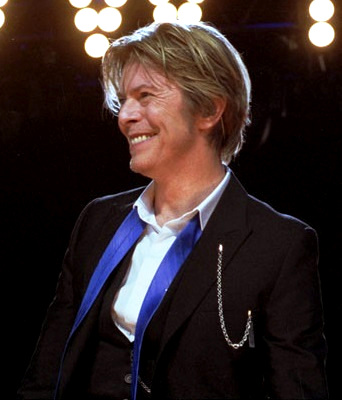
Freddie Mercury (left) and David Bowie (right) are two of Lambert's biggest influences.

Lambert was inspired when his father gave him access to his large record collection of 1970s music. He was attracted to theatrical rock from artists like Queen, Led Zeppelin, and Aerosmith. Among his strongest influences are British singers such as Freddie Mercury, David Bowie and Robert Plant: "Those are the people I really gravitate towards." Lambert referred to Michael Jackson and Madonna as "King and Queen" because they creatively merged music with makeup, fashion and cinematic video. He also cites Christina Aguilera as an inspiration to him as a vocalist.

In March 2013, Lambert wrote an article for Out magazine's tribute to David Bowie, who was about to release a new album. In it, he explained how Bowie helped inform the expression of his own sexuality and gender in his work: "A light bulb went off—I wasn't into drag, I didn't want to dress like a woman, but I wanted to express my gender and artistic identity differently than the mainstream. Bowie was a key inspiration. It was about the androgyny of mixing it up, and that was what was so incredible about his concepts—he was one of the first rock stars to really push the idea that sexuality was not black and white but an exploration."

Lambert's own music has been influenced by numerous genres including classic rock, pop, and electronic music; and his performance style draws heavily from his stage experience. Lambert envisions himself as the type of artist "that creates from the ground up, not only an amazing song, but one with a beat, and a story, and a look, and a theme." For his second album, he used inspiration from classic disco, 1990s electronica, funk and dubstep music.

== Advocacy ==
=== Philanthropy ===
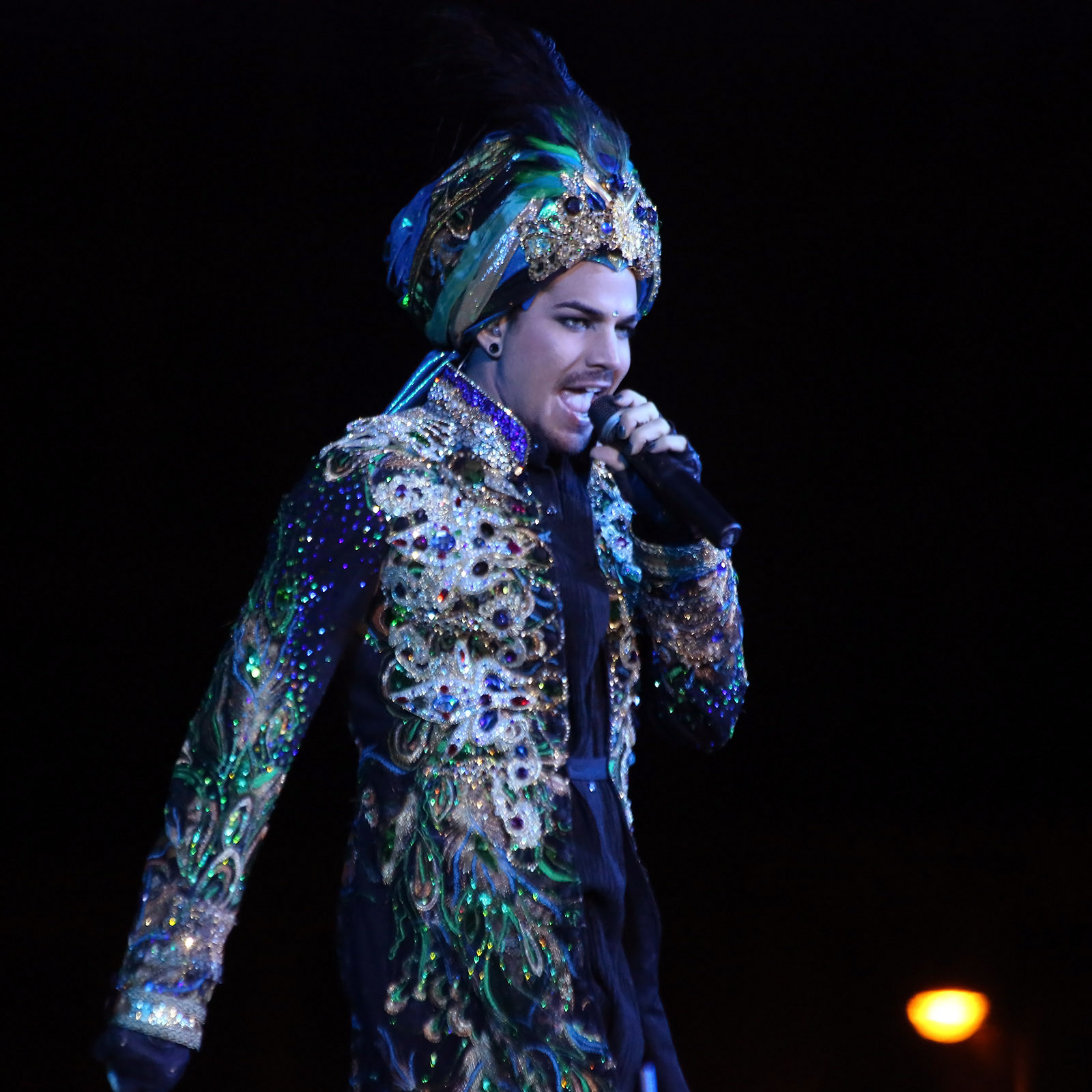
Lambert performing at the opening of the Life Ball 2013 in Vienna, Austria

Since his appearance on American Idol, Lambert has lent considerable support and time to charitable causes. As of October 2011, financial donations reached the $1,000,000 mark.

In January 2010, in lieu of gifts for his 28th birthday, Lambert asked fans to donate to DonorsChoose.org, as 2,435 fans donated $322,700. In June 2010, Lambert teamed with the charity for his "Glam A Classroom" campaign, raising another $208,590, supported by 3,020 fans. In October 2010, he collaborated on a second Signature Collection with The Pennyroyal Studio, which sold out after raising $43,092 for DonorsChoose. Lambert contributed to the MusiCares charity when he and The Pennyroyal Studio collaborated on the design of an Eye of Horus pendant, whose sale raised $32,000 in 7 days.

In January 2011, he began a campaign to raise $29,000 for charity: water to commemorate his 29th birthday and the campaign raised $323,803, which helped 16,190 people receive clean water. He continued his efforts for his 30th birthday, in January 2012, this time asking fans to "give up" their birthdays in an ongoing drive that raised $82,000 by May 2012. In June 2013, an accounting by charity:water listed 55 projects thus far completed with funds raised by Lambert.

Lambert returned to the American Idol stage for the March 10, 2011, results show, singing an acoustic version of his For Your Entertainment track "Aftermath". After the performance, a dance remix version was made available for purchase, with proceeds benefiting The Trevor Project.

Lambert performed at a Royal Albert Hall concert on June 7, 2012, benefiting the Rays Of Sunshine Children's Charity. On June 30, Elton John and Queen + Adam Lambert coordinated with the Olena Pinchuk ANTIAIDS Foundation for a concert to benefit the fight against HIV/AIDS. On September 25, 2012, Lambert headlined a fundraising benefit in Washington, D.C., on behalf of Marylanders for Marriage Equality.

On January 31, 2013, he received the Unity Award, which honors artists whose music spreads "peaceful messages", from the We Are Family Foundation at their 2012 Celebration Gala 2.0. Lambert "donated" his 31st birthday to the charity, raising more than $82,000 in just over a week. For his 32nd birthday, he chose the charity again, coordinating with artist Chris Saunders on the creation of limited and open edition prints and posters whose sales benefited the foundation. On May 25, Lambert was a participant in the opening ceremony of 2013 Life Ball in Vienna. Appearing as Ali Baba, he performed the gala's official song, "Love Wins Over Glamour", which he co-wrote with the Vienna-based production team Beat4Feet. On June 23, he sang "The Star-Spangled Banner" to open Broadway Bares to benefit Broadway Cares/Equity Fights AIDS. Lambert was a featured performer at the August 19 Dance Party event in Riverhead, Long Island, benefiting All for the East End (AFTEE). On November 2, he was the musical entertainer for South Florida's Make-A-Wish Foundation Ball. The sold-out 2013 Ball raised a record-breaking 2 million dollars.

Lambert was featured in the video launch for UNICEF's #IMAGINE campaign. In collaboration with Queen, he is a participant in Coca-Cola's [RED] campaign to help end mother-to-child HIV transmission. In June 2015, he performed at the Roundhouse for the "One for the Boys" Fashion Ball. Earlier that month, he performed at the "Live Aid Uusi Lastensairaala" concert in Finland. In July 2016, he took part in the charity single "Hands", a tribute to the victims of the Orlando nightclub shooting.

In August 2017, Lambert performed a mini-set tribute to George Michael at Project Angel Food's Angel Awards gala, where Michael was the recipient of the Elizabeth Taylor Humanitarian Award, in recognition of his philanthropy. Lambert through his "Feel Something Foundation" again worked with the charity in November 2020 to deliver medically tailored Thanksgiving meals to those most vulnerable during COVID. He performed a duet in October with Cynthia Erivo for the virtual 2020 Carousel of Hope Ball in support of the Children's Diabetes Foundation. In July 2021, he helped raise $1.1 million in funds for Project Angel Food during their KTLA telethon.

=== LGBT advocacy and social activism ===
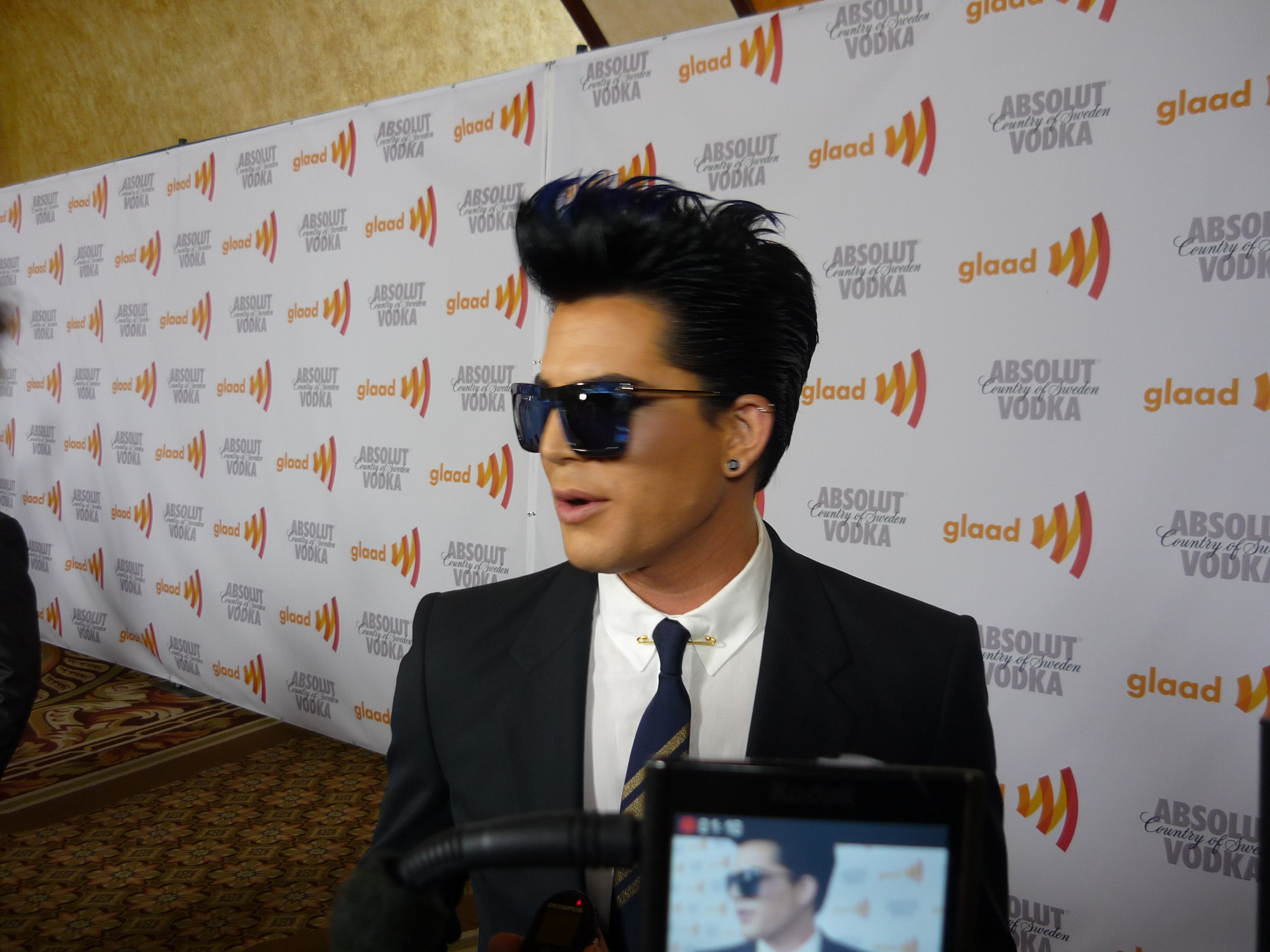
Lambert at the 21st GLAAD Media Awards (2010)

Lambert has been a contributor to social justice. Lambert stated, "I feel like with celebrity and visibility and fame, there's a responsibility to try to give back and try to use the visibility for the greater good. It's not all about me. It's about trying to raise awareness and getting people to take action." His heavily provocative AMA performance, featuring a gay kiss on live television, served to push societal boundaries by highlighting a double standard of ethics in media regulation as well.

Lambert received a nomination for Outstanding Music Artist at the 21st GLAAD Media Awards in 2010. The same year, he lent his voice to a one-and-a-half-minute video message on YouTube for the It Gets Better campaign – a project created by columnist Dan Savage in response to school bullying and a rash of suicides among LGBT youth.

Lambert was presented the "Equality Idol Award" by Sam Sparro at the Equality California Los Angeles Equality Awards in August 2011 for being an exemplary role model for the LGBT community. He was honored with his mother the following month at the PFLAG National Los Angeles event for his "authentic" voice. The following March, he released a Billboard remix version of his For Your Entertainment song "Aftermath" with a portion of the proceeds going to support The Trevor Project, the leading national organization providing crisis intervention and suicide prevention services to LGBT youth. He raised an additional $43,500 for The Trevor Project after collaborating with The Pennyroyal Studio to make his own Peace pendant. In October 2011, donations on behalf of the Adam Lambert Glambert Fan Army for the MTV Dance Party Marathon raised funds to combat bullying in honor of National Bullying Prevention Month. Lambert was a participant in Spirit Day, a movement begun in 2010 to honor LGBT lives lost to suicide, "going purple" in the push to support LGBT youth in the fight against bullying. In December, he performed at the "Cyndi Lauper & Friends: Home for the Holidays" benefit concert, which raised funds in support of the "True Colors Fund" and the organization's "Forty to None Project", targeting the epidemic of homelessness among LGBT youth. In January 2012, in an exclusive interview with UK music news magazine Pressparty, Lambert noted that despite social progress in the US, there was still a long way to go, particularly in the music industry: "I still long for the LGBT community's diversity to be more broadly represented in the entertainment industry. I think larger strides have been made in film and TV but we still are just at the beginning with mainstream music. I consider myself a post-gay man working in a pre-gay industry."

Lambert was the headline performer at the Miami Beach Gay Pride Parade and Festival on April 14, 2013, and was also given the key to the city. Lambert was presented with the prestigious GLAAD Davidson/Valentini Award on May 11 in San Francisco. The honorary award is bestowed yearly to out media professionals who have made a significant difference in promoting equal rights in the LGBT community. On May 30, he was honored with the "Hope of Los Angeles Award" as part of the city's 3rd Annual LGBT Heritage Month. Lambert is featured in "The New F Word" campaign sponsored by the grassroots Friend Movement organization, which has launched a global effort aimed at self-empowerment and raising anti-bullying awareness through positive images in media and the arts. On June 15, declared "Adam Lambert Day" by the City Council, he headlined Pittsburgh's "Pride in the Street" concert. In honor of Pride season, Lambert partnered with AT&T and The Trevor Project for the "Live Proud Campaign", aiming to empower and raise awareness in the LGBTQ community. The $50,000 goal was met and on July 3 a check presentation was made to The Trevor Project during the private finale show given by Lambert. At the October 15 Los Angeles premiere of the movie Bridegroom, Lambert revealed that he donated a song to the score, and felt "humbled" to be connected to the project. The powerful documentary about the intersection of love and the politics of marriage equality won the 2013 Tribeca Film Festival's Audience Award for Best Documentary. Lambert was one of the featured performers at the TrevorLIVE gala on December 8 at the Hollywood Palladium. In February 2014, he performed for the Family Equality Council's 10th Annual Los Angeles Award's dinner. In June 2014, he teamed up with AT&T for its second annual "Live Proud" campaign, again in support of LGBT Pride Month and Pride season.

In April 2015 he was the recipient of the "Music Icon" award at the 2015 British LGBT Awards, honoring those whose actions help promote equality. In October, he received the "Music Award/ International Album" at the Attitude Pride Awards in London.

In June 2017, Pride month, Lambert was a speaker at the Los Angeles Pride march, delivering a message against hate in all its human rights presentations. A few weeks earlier, he co-hosted BuzzFeed's first "Queer Prom" for LGBTQ high school seniors from across the US. He was featured in Billboard's tribute to Pride month, naming the LGBTQ community his "true inspiration" and "life lines". Released during Pride week, Lambert's newest single, "Two Fux", is a Pride anthem. Lambert performed for Point Foundation Honors Gala in October 2017 in recognition of those who had made a significant impact on the LGBTQ community. Point Foundation is the largest scholarship-granting organization for LGBTQ students of merit in the country. Later in the month, he performed on behalf of GLAAD's kickoff to its annual Spirit Day at the 'Believer' Spirit Day concert event. In May 2018, along with Melissa Etheridge, he performed to open the 29th GLAAD Media Awards in New York City; and later in the month hosted a talk for teenagers at the Mosaic LGBT Youth Centre in London. Mosaic is an organization that seeks to support, educate and inspire by offering a safe space and variety of programs for LGBTQ+ youth.

In January 2020, Lambert launched an LGBTQ+ non-profit advocacy group called the Feel Something Foundation, a name it shares with his first single release from the album Velvet. Its mission is to support "LGBTQ+ organizations that are moving the needle for communities of all ages and backgrounds," and impacting important areas of LGBTQ life. Another specific goal is to "abolish 'coming out' as a term used to define someone simply being themselves." During the COVID-19 pandemic lockdown, the Foundation in partnership with eBay launched two charity auctions of Lambert's stage-wear, with funds raised directed to GLAAD for LGBTQ people in need. The auction in June kicked off a series of events for Pride 2020 in support of GLAAD's youth engagement programs, including a panel with their Campus Ambassadors from around the US. In April 2020, Lambert had participated in GLAAD's Together in Pride: You Are Not Alone livestream event, raising funds for LGBTQ community centers providing critical services during COVID. In early June, he announced a sizable donation from the Foundation to the LGBTQ Freedom Fund, to assist with bail for community members that were arrested during peaceful protests of Black Lives Matter. On June 28, the Pride Music Business Creatives Roundtable was hosted by the Foundation, with Lambert and special guest artists discussing discrimination in the industry, their own coming out stories, and steps forward toward LGBTQ equalty. Other notable Pride performances included "Can't Cancel Pride" to support multiple LGBTQ+ organizations; and Global Pride, a 24-hour live-stream event, at which he also spoke on behalf of Black Lives Matter and people of color in the community. Lambert featured in a speaking segment on Conde Nast's LGBTQ brand them.'s "Out Now Live", a virtual pride celebration to educate, entertain and raise money for the Ali Forney Center targeting LGBTQ youth homelessness. In December he again performed for Cyndi Lauper's annual "Home for the Holidays" benefit concert for True Colors United, which works to combat homelessness in LGBTQ+ youth. He hosted the first of two Stonewall Day Unplugged sessions on February 18 as part of the lead up to the June Stonewall Day celebration that Lambert, through his Feel Something Foundation, headlined and curated with Pride Live.

The resulting OUTLOUD: Raising Voices event in 2021 featured a "queer for queer" lineup of LGBTQ artists. On March 4, he participated in a celebratory event in support of the Center for Gender-Affirming Care at San Diego's Rady Children's Hospital. Lambert, through his Feel Something Foundation, teamed up with Soundwaves Art Foundation in late March to create art prints, 100% of whose sale's profits would benefit The Trevor Project. He appeared on the Los Angeles LGBT Center's Love in Action telethon on August 14, 2021. In collaboration with his Feel Something Foundation, he directed his 2023 and 2024 birthday donations to the non-profit "Stand with Trans", whose support for queer mental health and wellness aligns with his foundation's.

In October 2023, Lambert signed the Artists4Ceasefire open letter to Joe Biden, President of the United States, calling for a ceasefire of the Israeli bombardment of Gaza.

== Personal life ==
After being outed on the internet during his bid to win American Idol, Adam Lambert confirmed that he is gay in a Rolling Stone cover interview that was published in June 2009. He was in a relationship with Finnish entertainment reporter and reality TV personality Sauli Koskinen from November 2010 until April 2013, when Lambert announced that the couple had split up amicably. From March to November 2019, Lambert was in a relationship with model Javi Costa Polo.

Lambert got his first tattoo at 27, just before the start of American Idol. That tattoo, an Eye of Horus, was placed on his wrist. Since then, he has covered his arms and torso with work by notable tattoo artists Maxime Plescia-Büchi, Daniel Meyer, and Roxx.

In November 2023, Lambert, in collaboration with Roger Taylor, Sarina Taylor, Bryan Patrick Franklin, and Michael Solis, opened The Wild bar in West Hollywood, California.

== Discography ==
- For Your Entertainment (2009)
- Trespassing (2012)
- The Original High (2015)
- Velvet (2020)
- High Drama (2023)
- Adam (2026)

== Concert tours ==
With American Idol

- American Idols Live! Tour 2009 (2009)

Solo

- Glam Nation Tour (2010)
- We Are Glamily Tour (2013)
- The Original High Tour (2016)
- The Velvet Tour (2020)
- The Witch Hunt (2022)

With Queen

- Queen + Adam Lambert Tour 2012 (2012)
- Queen + Adam Lambert Tour 2014–2015 (2014–2015)
- Queen + Adam Lambert 2016 Summer Festival Tour (2016)
- Queen + Adam Lambert Tour 2017–2018 (2017–2018)
- Queen + Adam Lambert The Rhapsody Tour (2019–2024)

== Filmography ==
=== Film ===
Year	Title	Role	Notes
2006	The Ten Commandments: The Musical	Joshua	
2014	Lennon or McCartney	Himself	Documentary short
2018	Bohemian Rhapsody	Truck Driver	Uncredited
2019	Playmobil: The Movie	Emperor Maximus	Voice
2021	Ratatouille: The Tiktok Musical	Emile	
2023	Fairyland	Charlie	
2024	Megamind vs. the Doom Syndicate	Machiavillain	Voice

=== Television ===
Year	Title	Role	Notes
2009	American Idol	Himself (contestant)	Season 8, 2nd place
2010	American Idol	Himself (mentor)	Season 9, Episode: "Top 9 – Elvis Presley"
2011	Project Runway	Himself (guest judge)	Season 9, Episode: "Image is Everything"
2011	Majors & Minors	Himself (mentor)	2 episodes
2012	Pretty Little Liars	Himself	Episode: "This Is a Dark Ride"
2012	VH1 Divas 2012	Himself (host)	Television special
2013–2014	Glee	Elliot "Starchild" Gilbert	5 episodes
2014	American Idol	Himself (mentor)	Season 13, Episode: "Boot Camp"
2014	RuPaul's Drag Race	Himself (guest judge)	Season 6, Episode: "RuPaul's Big Opening (Part 1)"
2015	American Idol	Himself (guest judge)	Season 14, Episode: "Long Island Auditions"
2016	The Rocky Horror Picture Show: Let's Do the Time Warp Again	Eddie	Television movie
2016	The X Factor	Himself (judge)	Season 8
2018	RuPaul's Drag Race All Stars	Himself (guest judge)	Season 3, Episode: "Handmaids to Kitty Girls"
2018	The Voice	Himself (advisor)	Season 7, Episode: "Knockouts 1"
2019	American Idol	Himself (mentor)	Season 17, Episode: "Top 8 – Queen Night"
2019	The Show Must Go On: The Queen + Adam Lambert Story	Himself	Television documentary
2020	One World: Together at Home	Himself	Television special
2020	Together in Pride: You Are Not Alone	Himself	Television special
2020	Moonbase 8	Billy	Episode: "Visitors"
2021	Legendary	Himself (guest judge)	Season 2, Episode: "Ovah!"
2021	We The People	Himself	Voice, Episode: "The Bill of Rights"
2021	A Tale Dark & Grimm	The Devil	6 episodes
2021	Clash of the Cover Bands	Himself (judge)	10 episodes
2022–2023	Starstruck	Himself (judge)	15 episodes
2022–2023	Britain Get Singing	Himself (judge)	Television specials, Seasons 1 and 2
2023	American Idol	Himself (mentor)	Season 21, Episode: "Rock and Roll Hall of Fame Night"
2023	RuPaul's Drag Race Down Under	Himself (guest judge)	Season 3, Episode: "Fake Housewives of Down Under"
2024	Megamind Rules!	Machiavillain (voice)	Voice, 4 episodes
2024	Fraggle Rock: Back to the Rock	The Great Glitterini (voice)	Voice, Season 2, Episode: "I'm Pogey"
2024	The Voice Australia	Himself (coach)	Season 13
2025	RuPaul's Drag Race	Himself (guest judge)	Season 17

=== Theatre ===
Year	Title	Role	Notes
2004	110 in the Shade	Phil Mackey	Pasadena Playhouse
2004	The Ten Commandments: The Musical	Joshua	Kodak Theatre
2005–2007	Wicked	Ensemble u/s Fiyero	US Tour
2007–2008	Wicked	Ensemble u/s Fiyero	Hollywood Pantages Theatre
2024–2025	Cabaret	The Emcee	August Wilson Theatre, Broadway
2025	Jesus Christ Superstar	Judas Iscariot	Hollywood Bowl

== See also ==
- List of awards and nominations received by Adam Lambert
