= Pressparty =

British-American press release hosting platform

- Website type: Global press release hosting platform for the music and entertainment industry
- Headquarters: London, New York
- Website: pressparty.com

Pressparty is a London and New York–based press release hosting platform used by the music and entertainment industry globally. Registered users have the ability to upload and read content but unregistered users can only read it. Users are able to access Pressparty through the website's interface, or via mobile.

Artist profiles feature a news desk and industry and company profiles feature a press release desk.

== Overview ==
Pressparty publishes official press releases from broadcasting networks, and about celebrities in pop music and entertainment. Some past artists that have posted press releases include: Rihanna, Lady Gaga, Justin Bieber, One Direction, Bruno Mars, Kelly Osbourne, and Drake.

Pressparty has in the past posted exclusive interviews with many artists such as Carly Rae Jepsen, Fifth Harmony, The Vamps, The Script, Lemar, Taylor Momsen, Savan Kotecha, Adam Lambert, and Janet Devlin.
