= Clash of the Cover Bands =

American musical reality competition television series

- Cover poster
- Genre: Reality competition
- Presented by: Stephen "tWitch" Boss
- Judges: Meghan Trainor; Adam Lambert; Ester Dean
- Country of origin: United States
- Original language: English
- No. of seasons: 1
- No. of episodes: 10

Production
- Executive producers: Jim Juvonen; Jimmy Fallon; Kelley Parker; Natasha Brugler
- Production location: NBC Studios
- Production companies: Electric Hot Dog; Universal Television Alternative Studio

Original release
- Network: E!
- Release: October 13 – December 22, 2021

Clash of the Cover Bands is an American music competition television series which aired on E! from October 13 to December 22, 2021. Produced by Jimmy Fallon, the show was hosted by Stephen "tWitch" Boss, with Meghan Trainor, Adam Lambert and Ester Dean as judges.

== Format ==
Each episode has two bands of similar musical genre, competing against each other in two rounds. The band with the most entertaining cover performance is declared the winner. The prize money is $10,000 and the winner gets a chance to perform on The Tonight Show Starring Jimmy Fallon.
