= New Eyes (Adam Lambert song) =

Single by Adam Lambert

from the album Velvet
- Released: May 15, 2019
- Genre: Rock
- Length: 3:44
- Label: Empire
- Songwriter(s): Adam Lambert; Paris Carney; Jamie Sierota
- Producer(s): Jamie Sierota

Adam Lambert singles chronology
"Feel Something" (2019)	"New Eyes" (2019)	"Comin in Hot" (2019)

Music video
- "New Eyes" on YouTube

"New Eyes" is a song by American singer Adam Lambert, released as the second single from his album Velvet on May 15, 2019. It was co-written by Lambert with Paris Carney and Jamie Sierota. The song's music video was released the same day. Lambert performed the song on the season 17 finale of American Idol on May 19.

== Background ==
Lambert said in 2018 that he had been inspired by "glam and classic rock from the '70s and '80s" when writing material for his upcoming album. He also called it the start of a "new era", as he "reached out" to new writers and artists during the process. He formally announced the release on May 7.

== Sound ==
According to Billboard writer Stephen Daw, "New Eyes" is "a fusion of modern and '70s rock where the singer embraces his new sound, and his new perspective".

== Critical reception ==
The Official Charts Company's Helen Ainsley called the song an "effortlessly cool, sleek song featuring a rhythmic guitar hook and a heavy, pulsing drum-beat [...] somewhere between Slow Hands by Niall Horan and Nick Jonas' Jealous". Mike Nied of Idolator said Lambert's "gratitude [towards a new lover] bubbles over on the instantly memorable chorus".

== Music video ==
The music video was released on May 15, 2019, and directed by Miles & AJ. It features psychedelic visuals and ends with a notice of "to be continued".

== Charts ==
Chart performance for "New Eyes"
Chart (2019)	Peak position
Australia Digital Tracks (ARIA)	36
