= ONR (singer) =

- Born: Robert David Shields
- Origin: Renfrewshire, Scotland
- Genres: Alternative; pop
- Labels: Warner Records, Capitol Records (former)
- Website: Official website

Robert David Shields, known professionally as ONR, is a Scottish musician, songwriter and producer.

== Early life and career ==
ONR is originally from Renfrewshire, but has spent most of his life living in Dumfries and Galloway, Scotland. As a teenager, he signed a publishing deal in Los Angeles, set up his own record label, and released an album. He would later form a band called Finding Albert, and composed music for various film and television projects including Sky Sports.

In mid-2016, he began releasing music under the ONR moniker through the Los Angeles indie label, Leftwing. Soon after, he signed a record deal with Capitol Records.

Influences on ONR include David Bowie, Kate Bush, Elton John, Arcade Fire, OMD and Interpol. Early on, he received support from LA radio stations, KCRW and KCSN. He released his first major label single, "Jericho," in August 2017 and played the main stage at the Electric Fields Festival soon after.

He released his second single "5 Years Time" in November 2017. He followed that with the release of "American Gods" in February 2018.

In August 2020, ONR released "Kill TV" on Warner Records which featured guitarist and producer Nile Rodgers. The two struck up a friendship after meeting at Abbey Road Studios.

ONR has toured across Europe with artists including Bastille, Jake Bugg, Lewis Capaldi and Mondo Cozmo.

In 2023 Shields was given the PRS Foundation "Hitmaker Award", the organisation's award for rising songwriters and producers.

His writing and production credits include artists such as Take That, Adam Lambert, Jake Bugg, Gryffin, Nile Rodgers, Phantogram and others. In 2026, he co-wrote and co-produced the opening track of Take That’s Dreamers album, “Wonderkids”, with Gary Barlow and Stuart Price.

Shields is a keen environmentalist and conservationist. In 2024, in collaboration with nature sound recordist Martyn Stewart, Shields wrote and produced the album "Imperfect Cadence", capturing the natural soundscapes of Scotland over fifty-years. The album received positive reviews from Billboard, NPR and Esquire. Lead single "You & I" was remixed and released through Brian Eno’s EarthPercent foundation.

Shields was a guest contributor at the Cooper Union Great Hall at New York Climate Week 2024 and has worked with organisations including The Museum of The United Nations.

== Discography ==
=== EPs ===
ONR EPs
Title	Details
Live in Scotland	Released: March 19, 2021; Label: Warner; Format: Digital download

=== Singles ===
List of singles showing chart positions, year released and album name
Single	Year	Peak chart positions		Album
Single	Year	US Alt.	US Rock	Album
"Jericho"	2017	—	—	Non-album singles
"5 Years Time"	2017	—	—	Non-album singles
"American Gods"	2018	—	—	Non-album singles
"Love in Suburbia"	2018	—	—	Non-album singles
"Sober" (featuring Carina Jade)	2020	—	—	Non-album singles
"Human Enough"	2020	—	—	Non-album singles
"Crash Landing"	2020	—	—	Non-album singles
"Kill TV" (featuring Nile Rodgers)	2020	—	—	Non-album singles
"Must Stop (Falling in Love)" (featuring Sarah Barthel)	2020	23	39	Non-album singles
"Peace on Earth / Little Drummer Boy"	2020	—	—	Non-album singles
"It Gets to a Point"	2021	—	—	Non-album singles
"Cold In My Shadow"	2023	—	—	Non-album singles
"Chemical"	2024	—	—	Non-album singles
"A Life"	2024	—	—	Non-album singles

=== As featured artist ===
List of singles showing year released and album name
Single	Year	Album
"Temper Temper" (with Sander van Doorn)	2020	Non-album single
