= SunFest =

Music and art festival in West Palm Beach, Florida

Coordinates: 26.712°N 80.050°W

- Genre: Pop, hip-hop, R&B, soul, funk, latin, Reggae, Blues, Rock & Roll, Alternative Rock, southern rock, hard rock, indie rock, Jazz, Bluegrass, Country, Folk, Electronic, EDM, Americana
- Dates: Late April to Early May
- Locations: West Palm Beach, FL
- Years active: 1982–2019, 2022-
- Founders: SunFest of Palm Beach County Inc.
- Website: www.sunfest.com

SunFest is a musical and art festival held annually in the first week of May in West Palm Beach, Florida. SunFest is the state's largest waterfront music and art festival in Florida and attracts more than 100,000 visitors. Main attractions of this festival are the three stages featuring live music with a diverse array of musical styles including Pop, Hip-Hop, R&B, Soul, Funk, Latin, Reggae, Blues, Rock & Roll, Alternative Rock, Southern Rock, Hard rock, Indie Rock, Jazz, Bluegrass, Country, Folk, Electronic, EDM, and Americana.

== History ==
The first SunFest in 1982 was a 10-day festival. The organizers incurred a debt that took three years to pay off, so they reduced the festival to three days in 1984. In 1986, its organizers decided to charge a $2 admission, and the event spanned five days by 1992. As of 2014, admission costs $25 at the gate, and its budget has expanded from $280,000 in 1984 to $2.2 million. The 1991 festival had the biggest crowd ever with 345,000 people. For 2018, the festival was reduced back to four days.

Some "SunFestivies" available at Sunfest are the Battle of the Bands, floating themed bars, the TGi5k and Art District. In the Art District you can immerse yourself in live artist demonstrations and performances. A crowd favorite is the ending firework show which captivates you and leaves you excited for the next SunFest. The many SunFestivites can vary by year.

== Organizational history ==
SunFest was founded in 1982 by SunFest of Palm Beach Country Inc. This corporation consists of twenty-five board members, twenty-five committees, and more than eighty sponsors. One of these sponsors, the "Palm Beach Cultural Council," funds SunFest Music Festival annually as a way to promote art and culture in Palm Beach County. Other funders who have helped create the festival include the state of Florida, Department of State, Division of Cultural Affairs, and Florida Arts Council. These funders have allowed SunFest to be a private 501(c)3 non-profit organization. SunFest Music Festival has received a lot of referrals from the Palm Beach Cultural Council's executive director Will Ray.
