= Mattis Jakobsen =

- Birth name: Mattis Jakobsen
- Origin: Elsinore, Denmark
- Genres: Soul, alternative rock
- Occupation: Singer-songwriter
- Instrument(s): Guitar, piano
- Years active: 2017 - present
- Labels: Sony Music, Warner Music

Mattis Jakobsen known by his stage name MATTIS, is a Danish singer and songwriter based in Copenhagen, Denmark. He first rose to prominence in 2017 with his debut single Loverboy which was released March 10th in Scandinavia. Loverboy was picked as the song of the week on DR P3 national radio in Denmark, peaked at #1 on Hype Machine, #1 on viral chart on Spotify Denmark and #3 on viral chart on Spotify Sweden.

== Career ==
July 2016 Mattis signed with Sony Music Denmark and started working on material for his forthcoming EP together with producer Ole Brodersen Meyer. On 10 March 2017, Mattis released his debut single "Loverboy" on Sony Music Denmark. "Loverboy" premiered on Wonderland Magazine and peaked at #1 on Hype Machine, #1 on viral chart on Spotify Denmark and #3 on viral chart on Spotify Sweden. June 2017 Mattis signed with Warner Music Germany and played Roskilde Festival. August 2017 Loverboy was released in Germany, Austria and Switzerland and premiered on Huffington Post.

== Discography ==
=== Singles ===
Title	Year
"Loverboy"	2017
"The Chain"	2018
"Into The Night"	2018
"Worry"	2018
"To The Rhythm"	2019
"To The Stars"	2021

=== EPs ===
Title	Year
"Into The Night EP"	2018
