= High Drama =

Studio album by Adam Lambert
- Released: February 24, 2023
- Recorded: 2022
- Genre: Pop
- Length: 38:19
- Label: More Is More; BMG
- Producer: Charley Bagnell; Jonny Coffer; Mark Crew; Tommy English; Amanda Ghost; Jeremy Hatcher; Ilsey Juber; George Moore; Dan Priddy; Andrew Wells; Freddy Wexler

Adam Lambert chronology
Live Around the World (2020)	High Drama (2023)	Afters (2024)

Singles from High Drama
- 1. "Ordinary World" Released: December 13, 2022; 2. "Holding Out for a Hero" Released: December 30, 2022; 3. "Getting Older" Released: January 27, 2023; 4. "You Make Me Feel (Mighty Real)" Released: June 2, 2023

High Drama is the fifth studio album and first covers album by American singer Adam Lambert. It was released on February 24, 2023, through More Is More and BMG.

== Background ==
The album was announced in December 2022.

== Critical reception ==
Professional ratings
Aggregate scores
Source	Rating
Metacritic	74/100
Review scores
Source	Rating
AllMusic	3.5/5 stars
The Line of Best Fit	7/10
Metro Weekly	4/5 stars
Riff Magazine	7/10

High Drama received generally positive reviews. Metacritic gave the album a score of 74 out of 100. Stephen Thomas Erlewine of AllMusic said, "High Drama is such an ideal title for Adam Lambert, a singer who specializes in grand, overheated gestures," and "he takes pains to give the 11 songs on High Drama distinctive arrangements that clearly delineate his version from the original." Metro Weekly's Sean Maunier wrote, "With a mix of songs that allow him to show off a range and versatility, High Drama highlights Lambert's skill as a curator, a side of himself that he has not really shown off much up until this point."

Writing for Riff Magazine Mike DeWald praised the album and especially Lambert's vocals. He wrote, "The real stars of the show here are his unmistakable pipes. Few have the power and range of Lambert's vocals, as evidenced by his recruitment to front Queen, a role he's tackled with poise."

== Release and promotion ==
High Drama was released by BMG Rights Management on February 24, 2023. To promote the album Lambert appeared on multiple television shows. On December 13, 2022, Lambert performed the lead single "Ordinary World" during the season 22 finale of The Voice. He performed "Holding Out for a Hero" on The National Lottery's Big Bash end-of-year special. On February 27, 2023, Lambert performed "Chandelier" on America's Got Talent: All-Stars finale with the season's winner. On April 30, he was a mentor during the twenty-first season of American Idol.

He also made appearances on The Jonathan Ross Show, The Tonight Show Starring Jimmy Fallon, Good Morning America, The View, Australian Idol, and That's My Jam.

== Commercial performance ==
High Drama debuted at number 126 on the US Billboard 200 selling 8,500 pure album sales.

== Track listing ==
High Drama track listing
No.	Title	Writer(s)	Producer(s)	Length
1.	"Holding Out for a Hero"	Dean Pitchford; Jim Steinman	Charley Bagnell; Andrew Wells	3:50
2.	"Chandelier"	Sia Furler; Jesse Shatkin	Mark Crew; Dan Priddy	3:44
3.	"Ordinary World"	Duran Duran	George Moore	3:20
4.	"Getting Older"	Billie Eilish O'Connell; Finneas O'Connell	Jeremy Hatcher; Tommy English	4:24
5.	"I Can't Stand the Rain"	Ann Peebles; Don Bryant; Bernard "Bernie" Miller	Moore	3:25
6.	"West Coast"	Lana Del Rey; Rick Nowels	Hatcher; English	3:39
7.	"Do You Really Want to Hurt Me"	Roy Hay; Boy George; Mikey Craig; Jon Moss	Moore	3:44
8.	"Sex on Fire"	Caleb Followill; Jared Followill; Matthew Followill; Nathan Followill	Hatcher; English	3:19
9.	"My Attic"	Julia Michaels; Ilsey Juber; Freddy Wexler	Juber; Wexler	3:19
10.	"I'm a Man"	Bruce Wayne Campbell	Moore	2:55
11.	"Mad About the Boy"	Noël Coward	Amanda Ghost; Jonny Coffer	2:50
Total length:				38:19

== Personnel ==
Credits adapted from AllMusic.

Vocals

- Benedict Cork – background vocals
- Adam Lambert – primary artist, vocals
- Lauren Salamone – background vocals

Musicians

- Billy Adamson – guitar
- Charley Bagnell – drums, synthesizer
- Fiona Bonds – viola
- Mike Bryne – drums
- Reiad Chibah – viola
- Mark Crew – keyboards
- Agata Daraskaite – viola
- Mary Dolan – viola
- Tommy English – guitar, keyboards
- Aliayta Foon-Dancoes – violin
- Thomas Gould – violin
- Jeremy Hatcher — bass guitar, guitar, keyboards
- Toby Hughes – bass guitar
- Jeremy Issac – violin
- Venetia Jollands – violin
- Laurance Juber – guitar
- Ashok Klouda – cello
- Charlie Laffer – bass
- Oliver Langford – violin
- Jack LaVelle – guitar
- Eloise Macdonald – violin
- Robin Mullarkey – guitar
- Will Newell – violin
- Elliot Perks – viola
- Dan Priddy – keyboards
- Reuben Priddy – bass, guitar
- Juliette Roos – violin
- Roberto Ruisi – violin
- Peter Sokolovskis – violin
- Stephane Tress – cello
- Andrew Wells – bass guitar, drums, guitar, synthesizer

Production

- Charley Bagnell – additional production producer
- Jonny Coffer – additional production, producer
- Jeremy Cooper – mastering
- Mark Crew – engineer, producer, programming
- Tommy English – producer, programming
- Amanda Ghost – producer
- Dan Grech-Marguerat – mixing
- Martin Hannah – engineer, tracking
- Jeremy Hatcher – engineer, producer, programming
- Jonas Jalhay – engineer
- Ilsey Juber – producer
- Adam Lambert – executive producer
- Bill Mallin – mixing
- George Moore – producer
- Michael Nolasco – engineer, tracking
- Mads Perch – photography
- Dan Priddy – producer, programming
- Will Purton – string engineer
- Jonathan Quarmby – vocal producer
- Richard Robinson – art direction
- Jenny Solway – engineer
- Cenzo Townsend – mixing
- Andrew Wells – programming
- Freddy Wexler – producer
- Eg White — string arrangements
- Richard Woodcraft – tracking

== Charts ==
Chart performance for High Drama
Chart (2023)	Peak position
Australian Albums (ARIA)	7
Austrian Albums (Ö3 Austria)	34
Belgian Albums (Ultratop Flanders)	120
German Albums (Offizielle Top 100)	20
Hungarian Albums (MAHASZ)	4
New Zealand Albums (RMNZ)	16
Swiss Albums (Schweizer Hitparade)	27
UK Albums (Official Charts)	5
US Billboard 200	126
