= Adam Lambert discography =

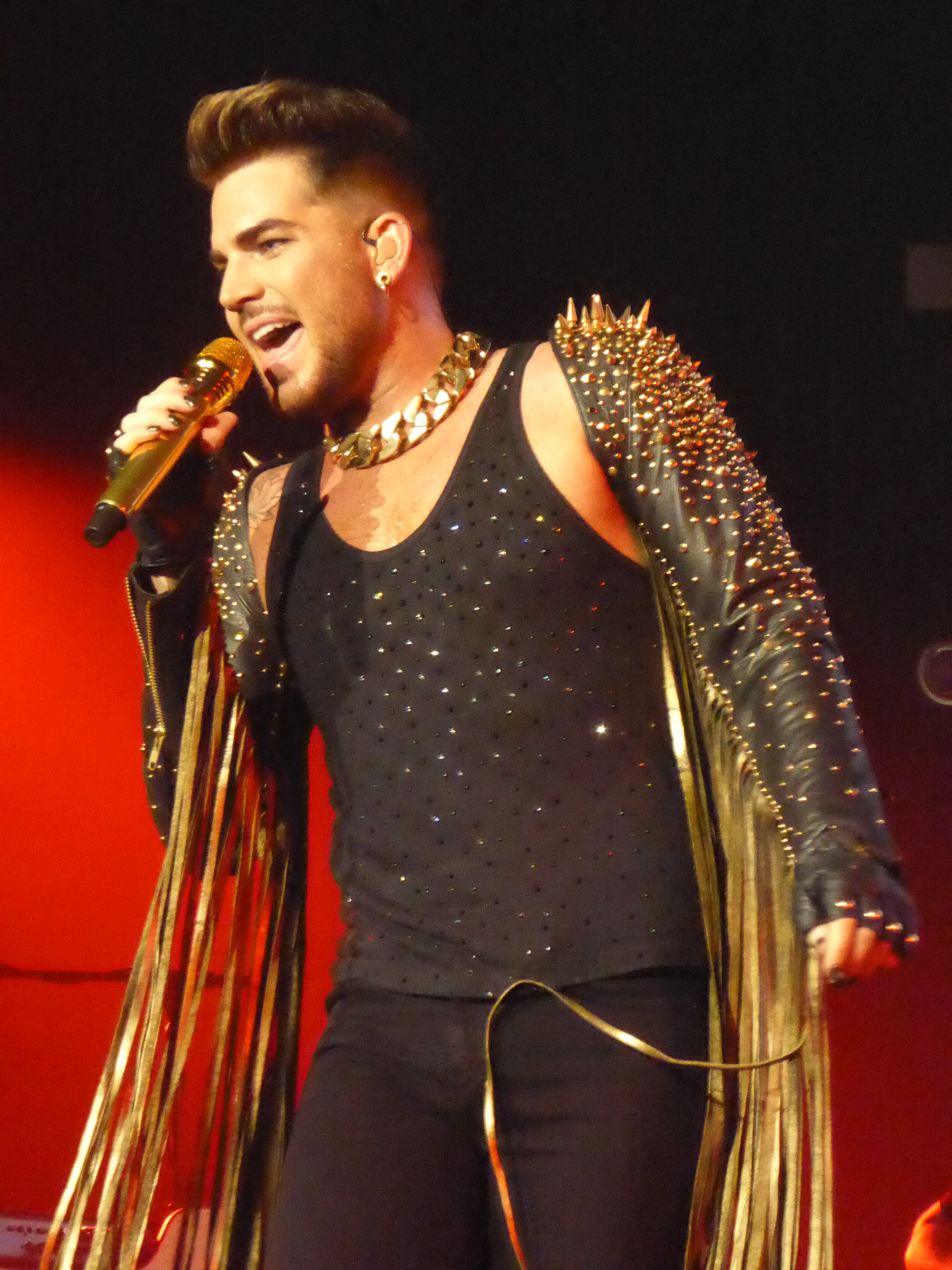
- Lambert performing with Queen during Queen + Adam Lambert Tour 2014–2015
- Studio albums: 6
- Extended plays: 6
- Live albums: 1
- Compilation albums: 5
- Singles: 25
- Music videos: 13

American singer Adam Lambert has released six studio albums, one live album, five compilation albums, six extended plays, twenty-five singles, and thirteen music videos. As of January 2011, he had sold 1.2 million albums and 4.2 million singles worldwide.

After Lambert's coming in second place in American Idol, Rufftown Recordings released a demo album of song recordings made prior to his being on American Idol. The album, Take One, was released on November 17, 2009. It debuted and peaked on the Billboard 200 at number 72, and as of January 2010 had sold over 40,000 copies in the United States. Lambert's mainstream debut album, For Your Entertainment, was released one week after Take One, on November 23, 2009, via RCA Records. It features the lead-song from the 2012 film, and is also available on the film's soundtrack as well. To date, the album has been certified Platinum in Canada and in New Zealand. The album's first single was its title track "For Your Entertainment". The song failed to significantly impact the Billboard Hot 100, only charting to number 61. However, it has become a Top 5 single on the Hot Dance Club Songs chart and has been more successful internationally—being a Top 10 single in both New Zealand and Finland. The song was also certified Platinum in Canada. The next single released, "Whataya Want from Me", has become the highest-charting single from the album and Lambert's most successful single thus far, peaking at number 10 on Billboard Hot 100, and has experienced international success. The third single release was "If I Had You", which became another top 30 single, both in the States and in some international markets.

Lambert's second studio album, Trespassing, was released on May 15, 2012, and topped the Billboard 200 chart. The album has been met with a generally favorable reception from critics and spawned three singles, "Better Than I Know Myself", "Never Close Our Eyes" and "Trespassing". Lambert's former label RCA Records released The Very Best of Adam Lambert on May 27, 2014, featuring hits from his two studio albums as well as performances lifted from his time on both American Idol and Glee.

Lambert's third album, The Original High, was released on April 21, 2015. Its lead single "Ghost Town" entered the Billboard Hot 100 at number 73, and charted on the Billboard Adult Top 40. The New York Times stated it "was perhaps his best single to date". The Original High debuted at number three on the Billboard 200 selling 42,000 albums and moving 47,000 total units, including track and streaming equivalent albums. Lambert garnered his first top ten album in the United Kingdom, with a number eight debut on the UK Albums Chart. As with "Ghost Town", reviews were largely positive.

His fourth studio album, Velvet, was released through More Is More and Empire on March 20, 2020, following the release of the EP Velvet: Side A on September 27, 2019.

Lambert released his fifth studio album, High Drama, through BMG on February 24, 2023.

On July 19, 2024, Lambert released the six-track EP "Afters" via More Is More. Inspired by electronic dance music and queer nightlife, the project explored sexuality and after-hours hedonism through songs including “Lube”, “Wet Dream”, “CVNTY”, “Face”, “Deep House” and “Neck”. Lambert described the EP as a more uninhibited and explicitly queer project than his earlier work.

Lambert released his self-titled sixth studio album, ADAM, through More Is More and The Orchard on July 10, 2026. Its sound drew upon the industrial rock, electronic and alternative pop music that influenced Lambert during the 1990s and early 2000s. The album was preceded by the singles “Eat U Alive” and “Under the Rhythm”. “Eat U Alive”, released in May 2026, introduced the album’s darker industrial sound, while “Under the Rhythm” followed in June. “Cloud 9” was released alongside the album on July 10.

== Albums ==
=== Studio albums ===
List of studio albums, with selected details, chart positions, sales, and certifications
Title	Studio album details	Peak chart positions										Sales	Certifications
Title	Studio album details	US	AUS	AUT	BEL (FL)	CAN	GER	NLD	NZ	SWE	UK	Sales	Certifications
For Your Entertainment	Released: November 23, 2009; Label: RCA, 19; Formats: CD, digital download, streaming	3	5	22	56	7	16	25	5	8	36	US: 863,000	RIAA: Gold; ARIA: Platinum; MC: Platinum; RMNZ: Platinum; BPI: Silver
Trespassing	Released: May 15, 2012; Label: RCA, 19; Formats: CD, digital download, streaming	1	10	28	64	1	28	30	4	20	16	US: 197,000; UK: 7,107	
The Original High	Released: June 16, 2015; Label: Warner; Formats: CD, digital download, LP, streaming	3	4	43	61	3	20	10	6	51	8	US: 42,000; CAN: 4,800; UK: 9,817	
Velvet	Released: March 20, 2020; Label: Empire, More Is More; Formats: CD, digital download, streaming	89	8	—	112	—	77	—	—	—	54		
High Drama	Released: February 24, 2023; Label: BMG, More Is More; Formats: CD, digital download, streaming	126	7	34	120	—	20	—	16	—	5		
ADAM	Released: July 10, 2026; Label: The Orchard, More Is More; Formats: CD, LP, cassette, digital download, streaming	—	36	—	—	—	—	—	—	—	98		
"—" denotes a recording that did not chart or was not released in that territory.

=== Live albums ===
Title	Album details	Peak chart positions									Sales	Certifications
Title	Album details	US	US Video	AUS	BEL (FL)	FIN	GER	NZ	NLD	UK	Sales	Certifications
Glam Nation Live	Released: March 22, 2011; Label: RCA; Formats: CD, DVD, digital download	—	1	— (Note: "Glan Nation Live" did not enter on the Australian Top 50 Albums Chart, but peaked at number five on the Australian DVD charts.)	—	32	94	14	99	185	US: 41,000; CAN: 1,195	
Live Around the World (with Queen)	Released: October 2, 2020; Label: EMI, Hollywood; Formats: CD, CD+DVD, CD+Blu-ray, vinyl	56	—	1	14	14	5	4	6	1		BPI: Silver
"—" denotes a recording that did not chart or was not released in that territory.

=== Compilation albums ===
Title	Album details	Peak chart positions		Sales
Title	Album details	US	US Indie	Sales
Season 8 Favorite Performances	Released: June 30, 2009; Label: RCA; Format: Digital download	33	4	US: 35,000
Take One	Released: November 17, 2009; Label: Rufftown, Central South; Formats: CD, digital download	72	6	US: 42,000
Beg for Mercy	Released: November 21, 2011; Label: Colwel Platinum Entertainment; Formats: CD, digital download	— (Note: "Beg for Mercy" did not enter the Billboard 200, but peaked at number 27 on the Independent Albums chart.)	27	
Paramount Sessions	Released: November 27, 2011; Label: Coldwater Entertainment Limited; Format: CD	—	—	
Playlist: The Very Best of Adam Lambert	Released: May 27, 2014; Label: Legacy; Format: CD, digital download	— (Note: "Playlist: The Very Best of Adam Lambert" did not enter the Billboard 200, but peaked at number 187 on the Top Current Albums chart.)	—	
"—" denotes a recording that did not chart or was not released in that territory.

== Extended plays ==
Title	Details	Peak chart positions			Sales
Title	Details	US	US Indie	AUS	Sales
Remixes	Released: April 9, 2010; Label: RCA; Format: digital download	—	—	—	US: 7,000
Acoustic Live!	Released: December 6, 2010; Label: RCA; Formats: CD, digital download	126	—	—	US: 28,000
Spotify Sessions	Released: June 15, 2015; Label: Warner Records, Inc.; Format: streaming	—	—	—	
Velvet: Side A	Released: September 27, 2019; Label: More Is More, Empire Distribution; Format: Digital download, streaming	148	5	72	
Velvet: Side A (The Live Sessions)	Released: January 10, 2020; Label: More Is More, Empire Distribution; Format: Digital download, streaming	—	—	—	
Afters	Released: July 19, 2024; Label: More Is More; Format: Streaming	—	—	—	
"—" denotes a recording that did not chart or was not released in that territory.

== Singles ==
=== As lead artist ===
Title	Year	Peak chart positions										Certifications	Album
Title	Year	US	AUS	AUT	CAN	DEN	GER	NLD	NZ	SWE	UK	Certifications	Album
"No Boundaries"	2009	72	—	—	52	—	—	—	38	—	111		Non-album single
"Time for Miracles"	2009	50	—	—	26	—	—	—	—	—	—		2012
"For Your Entertainment"	2009	61	32	—	23	—	—	—	10	—	37	ARIA: Gold; MC: Platinum; RMNZ: Platinum	For Your Entertainment
"Whataya Want from Me"	2009	10	4	4	3	12	5	7	4	8	53	ARIA: Platinum; BVMI: Gold; IFPI AUT: Gold; IFPI DEN: Gold; IFPI SWE: 2× Platinum; MC: 3× Platinum; RMNZ: Platinum	For Your Entertainment
"If I Had You"	2010	30	4	50	8	—	36	—	7	—	—	ARIA: 2× Platinum; RMNZ: Platinum	For Your Entertainment
"Fever"	2010	—	—	—	—	—	—	—	19	—	—		For Your Entertainment
"Sure Fire Winners"	2011	—	—	—	—	—	—	—	—	—	—		For Your Entertainment
"Aftermath"	2011	—	—	—	—	—	—	—	—	—	—		For Your Entertainment
"Sleepwalker"^{[A]}	2011	—	—	—	90	—	63	—	—	—	—		For Your Entertainment
"Better Than I Know Myself"	2011	76	83	—	56	—	88	—	—	—	—		Trespassing
"Never Close Our Eyes"	2012	— (Note: "Never Close Our Eyes" did not enter the Billboard Hot 100, but peaked at number ten on the Bubbling Under Hot 100 chart.)	—	56	62	—	—	—	24	—	17		Trespassing
"Trespassing"	2012	—	—	—	92	—	—	—	—	—	—		Trespassing
"Ghost Town"	2015	64	2	10	55	30	11	6	27	25	71	RIAA: Gold; ARIA: 2× Platinum; BVMI: Platinum; IFPI AUT: Gold; IFPI DEN: Platinum; IFPI SWE: 2× Platinum; NVPI: 3× Platinum	The Original High
"Another Lonely Night"	2015	— (Note: "Another Lonely Night" did not enter the Billboard Hot 100, but peaked at number 25 on the Adult Top 40 songs chart.)	107	—	—	—	—	35	—	—	—		The Original High
"Welcome to the Show" (featuring Laleh)	2016	—	—	—	—	—	—	—	—	— (Note: "Welcome to the Show" did not enter the Swedish Singles Chart, but peaked at number two on the Swedish Heatseeker chart.)	—		Non-album singles
"Two Fux"	2017	—	—	—	—	—	—	—	—	—	—		Non-album singles
"Feel Something"	2019	— (Note: "Feel Something" did not enter the Billboard Hot 100, but peaked at number 22 on the Digital Song Sales chart.)	—	—	— (Note: "Feel Something" did not enter the Canadian Hot 100, but peaked at number 44 on the Hot Canadian Digital Song Sales chart.)	—	—	—	—	—	— (Note: "Feel Something" did not enter the UK Singles Chart Top 100, but peaked at number 69 on the UK Singles Downloads Chart.)		Velvet
"New Eyes"	2019	—	— (Note: "New Eyes" did not enter the ARIA Singles Chart, but peaked at number 36 on the ARIA Digital Track Chart.)	—	—	—	—	—	—	—	—		Velvet
"Comin in Hot"	2019	—	—	—	—	—	—	—	—	—	—		Velvet
"Superpower" (Note: "Superpower" also appears on Lambert's EP Velvet: Side A.)	2019	— (Note: "Superpower" did not enter the Billboard Hot 100, but peaked at number 36 on the Adult Top 40 songs chart.)	—	—	—	—	—	—	—	—	— (Note: "Superpower" did not enter the UK Singles Chart, but peaked at number 29 on the UK Singles Downloads Chart.)		Velvet
"Believe"	2019	— (Note: "Believe" did not enter the Billboard Hot 100, but peaked at number 23 on the Digital Song Sales chart.)	—	—	— (Note: "Believe" did not enter the Canadian Hot 100, but peaked at number 42 on the Hot Canadian Digital Song Sales chart.)	—	—	—	—	—	— (Note: "Believe" did not enter the UK Singles Chart, but peaked at number 52 on the UK Singles Chart.)		Non-album single
"Roses" (featuring Nile Rodgers)	2020	—	—	—	—	—	—	—	—	—	—		Velvet
"Velvet"	2020	—	—	—	—	—	—	—	—	—	—		Velvet
"Mad About the Boy"	2022	—	—	—	—	—	—	—	—	—	— (Note: "Mad About the Boy" did not enter the UK Singles Chart, but peaked at number 43 on the UK Singles Downloads Chart.)		High Drama & Mad About the Boy – The Noël Coward Story
"Ordinary World"	2022	—	—	—	—	—	—	—	—	—	— (Note: "Ordinary World" did not enter the UK Singles Top 100, but peaked at 42 on the UK Singles Downloads Chart.)		High Drama
"Holding Out for a Hero"	2022	—	—	—	— (Note: "Holding Out for a Hero" did not enter the Canadian Hot 100, but peaked at number 43 on the Canadian Digital Song Sales chart.)	—	—	—	—	—	— (Note: "Holding Out for a Hero" did not enter the UK Singles Chart Top 100, but peaked at number 32 on the UK Singles Downloads Chart.)		High Drama
"Getting Older"	2023	—	—	—	—	—	—	—	—	—	—		High Drama
"You Make Me Feel (Mighty Real)" (with Sigala)	2023	—	—	—	—	—	—	—	—	—	—		High Drama
"Lube"	2024	—	—	—	—	—	—	—	—	—	—		Afters
"Wet Dream"	2024	—	—	—	—	—	—	—	—	—	—		Afters
"Cvnty"	2024	—	—	—	—	—	—	—	—	—	—		Afters
"I Don't Care Much"	2024	—	—	—	—	—	—	—	—	—	—		Non-album single
"Eat U Alive"	2026	—	—	—	—	—	—	—	—	—	—		Adam
"Under The Rhythm"	2026	—	—	—	—	—	—	—	—	—	—		Adam
"Cloud 9"	2026	—	—	—	—	—	—	—	—	—	—		Adam
"—" denotes a recording that did not chart or was not released in that territory.

=== As featured artist ===
Title	Year	Peak chart positions	Album
Title	Year	US Pop Dig	Album
"The Fox" (Glee Cast featuring Adam Lambert)	2013	—	non-album single
"Into the Groove" (Glee Cast featuring Adam Lambert)	2014	—	non-album single
"I Believe in a Thing Called Love" (Glee Cast featuring Adam Lambert)	2014	—	non-album single
"Barracuda" (Glee Cast featuring Adam Lambert)	2014	—	non-album single
"Gloria" (Glee Cast featuring Adam Lambert)	2014	—	non-album single
"The Happening" (Glee Cast featuring Adam Lambert and Demi Lovato)	2014	—	non-album single
"Hold On" (Glee Cast featuring Adam Lambert and Demi Lovato)	2014	44	non-album single
"Can't Go Home" (Steve Aoki and Felix Jaehn featuring Adam Lambert)	2016	—	non-album single
"Broken" (Tritonal and Jenaux featuring Adam Lambert)	2016	—	Painting With Dreams
"Bacteria" (Boy George featuring Adam Lambert)	2022	—	60460

=== Promotional singles ===
Title	Year	Album
"Underground"	2015	The Original High
"Evil in the Night"	2015	The Original High

== Other charted songs ==
Title	Year	Peak chart positions						Album
Title	Year	US	CAN	NZ Hot	POL	UK Digital	UK Rock	Album
"Mad World"	2009	19	10	—	—	—	—	Season 8 Favorite Performances
"A Change Is Gonna Come"	2009	56	59	—	—	—	—	Season 8 Favorite Performances
"One"	2009	82	84	—	—	—	—	Season 8 Favorite Performances
"Cryin'"	2009	— (Note: "Cryin'" did not enter the Billboard Hot 100, but peaked at number two on the Bubbling Under Hot 100 chart.)	75	—	—	—	—	Season 8 Favorite Performances
"The Tracks of My Tears"	2009	— (Note: "The Tracks of My Tears" did not enter the Billboard Hot 100, but peaked at number 17 on the Bubbling Under Hot 100 chart.)	—	—	—	—	—	Season 8 Favorite Performances
"Feeling Good"	2009	— (Note: "Feeling Good" did not enter the Billboard Hot 100, but peaked at number 21 on the Bubbling Under Hot 100 chart.)	—	—	—	—	—	Season 8 Favorite Performances
"Slow Ride"(with Allison Iraheta)	2009	— (Note: "Slow Ride'" did not enter the Billboard Hot 100, but peaked at number five on the Bubbling Under Hot 100 chart.)	—	—	—	—	—	American Idol: Season 8: The 5 Song EP
"Can't Let You Go"	2010	—	—	—	—	—	34	For Your Entertainment
"The Original High"	2016	—	—	—	23	—	—	The Original High
"Please Come Home for Christmas"	2019	—	—	36	—	—	—	Spotify Singles
"Chandelier"	2023	—	—	—	—	90	—	High Drama
"—" denotes a recording that did not chart or was not released in that territory.

== Music videos ==
Title	Year	Director(s)
"Time for Miracles"	2009	Wayne Isham
"For Your Entertainment"	2009	Ray Kay
"Whataya Want from Me"	2010	Diane Martel
"If I Had You"	2010	Bryan Barber
"Better Than I Know Myself"	2012	Ray Kay
"Never Close Our Eyes"	2012	Dori Oskowitz
"Ghost Town"	2015	Hype Williams
"Another Lonely Night"	2015	Luke Gilford
"Welcome to the Show"	2016	Lee Cherry and Adam Lambert
"Can't Go Home"	2016	Romain F. Dubois and Ménad Kesraoui
"New Eyes"	2019	Miles & AJ
"Comin in Hot"	2019	Miles & AJ
"Superpower"	2019	Millicent Hailes
"Velvet"	2020	Charlotte Rutherford

=== Guest appearances ===
Title	Year	Artist(s)	Director
"Imagine" (UNICEF: World version)	2014	Various	Michael Jurkovac
"You Need to Calm Down"	2019	Taylor Swift	Taylor Swift and Drew Kirsch

=== Other appearances ===
Title	Year	Other artist(s)	Album
"Live the Life"	2011	J. Scott G.	Live the Life EP
"Lay Me Down"	2013	Avicii	True
"Marry the Night"	2013	Glee Cast	A Katy or a Gaga
"Roar"	2013	Glee Cast	A Katy or a Gaga
"Rockstar"	2014	Glee Cast	New New York
"Can't Go Home"	2016	Steve Aoki and Felix Jaehn	Non-album single
"Hands"	2016	Various Artists	non-album single
"Broken"	2016	Tritonal and Jenaux	Painting with Dreams
"Think"	2017	—N/a	Captain Underpants Movie Soundtrack
"Mad World"	2020	—N/a	One World: Together at Home
"Super Power"	2020	—N/a	One World: Together at Home
