= List of awards and nominations received by Adam Lambert =

Adam Lambert awards and nominations
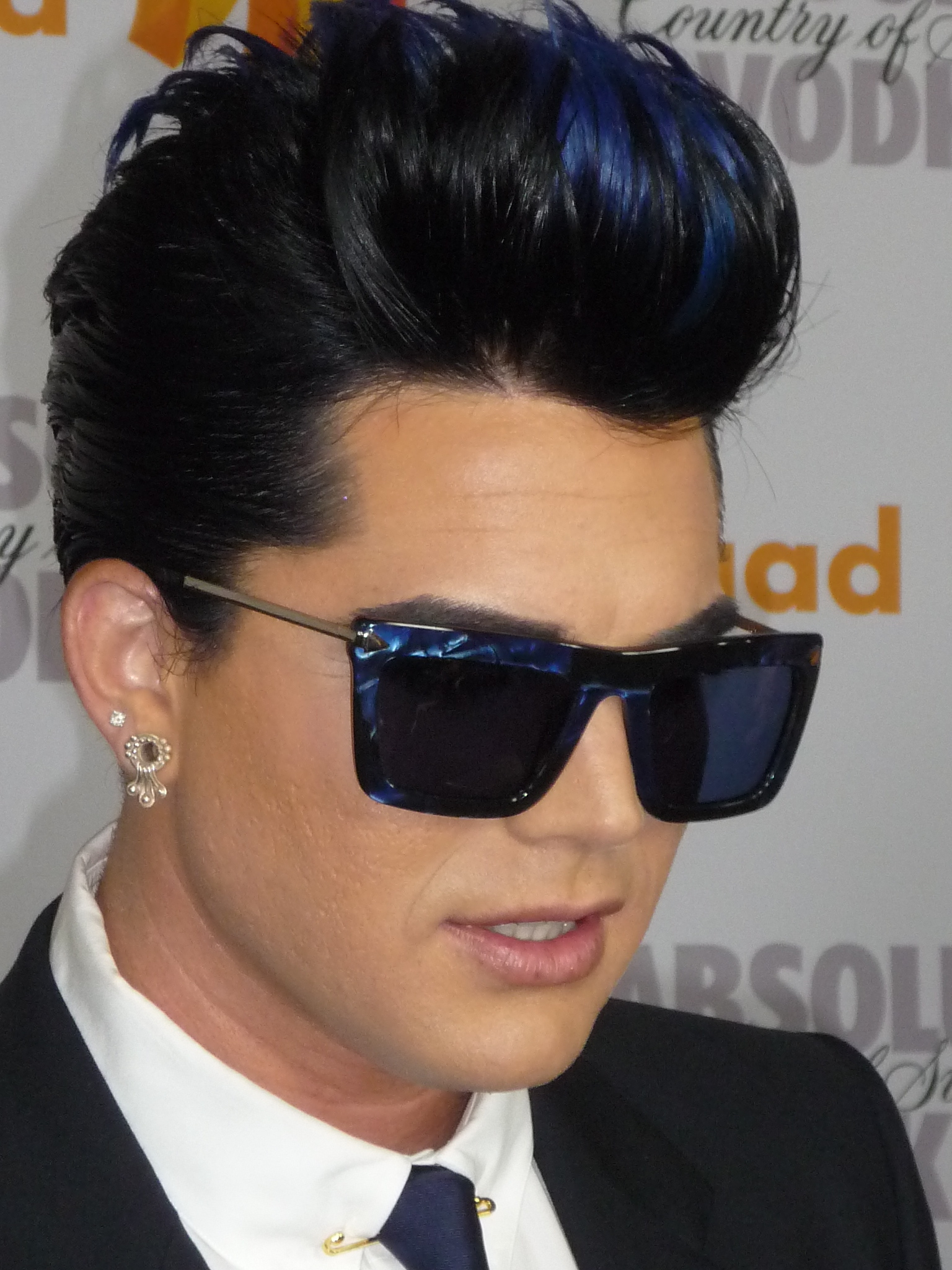
- Lambert at 2010 GLAAD Media Awards
Awards and nominations
Award	Wins	Nominations
Billboard Music Awards	1	3
Billboard Japan Music Awards	0	1
BMI Music Awards	1	1
Bravo Otto Awards	0	2
Chinese Music Awards	1	1
CMA Wild and Young Awards	2	2
Do Something Awards	0	2
Emma Awards	0	1
Fonogram - Hungarian Music Awards	1	3
GLAAD Media Awards	2	5
Grammy Awards	0	1
Mashable Awards	0	1
MuchMusic Video Awards	1	3
O Music Awards	3	6
People's Choice Awards	0	1
Teen Choice Awards	1	4
Young Hollywood Awards	1	1

Totals (Note: Certain award groups do not simply award one winner. They acknowledge several different recipients, have runners-up, and have third place. Since this is a specific recognition and is different from losing an award, runner-up mentions are considered wins in this award tally. For simplification and to avoid errors, each award in this list has been presumed to have had a prior nomination.)
- Wins: 20
- Nominations: 54

Adam Lambert (born January 29, 1982) is an American singer, songwriter and stage actor born in Indianapolis but raised in San Diego. He began performing in amateur theatrical productions in childhood, a path he pursued into adulthood, appearing in professional productions in the U.S. and abroad.

Lambert became prominent after appearing on the eighth season of American Idol. Although he was runner-up, Lambert launched a music career with the release of the studio album For Your Entertainment (November 2009) after signing with 19 in a joint venture with RCA. The album debuted at number three on the Billboard 200, sold 198,000 copies in the U.S. in its first week, and reached the top 10 in several countries worldwide. Its singles "For Your Entertainment", "Whataya Want from Me" and "If I Had You" also became international successes. Soon after the album release, he headlined a worldwide concert tour, Glam Nation, the first American Idol contestant to do so in the year following his Idol season. The tour was followed by two live releases: an extended play entitled Acoustic Live! (2010), and a live CD/DVD Glam Nation Live (2011), which debuted at number one on the SoundScan Music Video chart. Lambert took executive producer credit and was a principal writer on his second studio album, Trespassing, released in May 2012, to critical acclaim. Trespassing made its debut in the number one spot on the Billboard 200 album chart, also topping the Billboard Digital Albums Chart and Canada's Digital Albums Chart. Lambert made music history as the first openly gay artist to achieve this top charting position.

Citing influence from various artists and genres, Lambert has a flamboyant, theatrical and androgynous performance style, and a powerful, technically skilled tenor voice with multi-octave range. He has received numerous awards and nominations, including a Grammy Award nomination for Best Male Pop Vocal Performance in 2011 as well as being named as an Honorary GLAAD Media Award recipient in 2013. By April 2012 his first album had sold nearly two million copies worldwide and 4.2 million singles worldwide as of January 2011. The Times identified Lambert as the first openly gay mainstream pop artist to launch a career on a major label in the U.S.

== Awards and nominations ==
Award	Year	Nominee(s)	Category	Result	Ref.
Attitude Awards	2015	Himself	The Music Award	Won	
BMI Pop Awards	2011	"Whataya Want From Me"	Award-Winning Song	Won	
Billboard Japan Music Awards	2011	Himself	Top Pop Artist	Nominated	
Billboard.com Mid-Year Music Awards	2012	Himself	Best Style	Nominated	
Billboard.com Mid-Year Music Awards	2012	"Never Close Our Eyes"	Best Music Video	Nominated	
Billboard.com Mid-Year Music Awards	2012	Trespassing	Favorite Billboard 200 No.1 Album	Won	
Bravo Otto Awards	2011	Himself	Best International Male Artist	Nominated	
Bravo Otto Awards	2013	Himself	Best International Male Artist	Nominated	
British LGBT Awards	2015	Himself	Music Icon Award	Won	
British LGBT Awards	2015	Himself	Music Artist	Nominated	
British LGBT Awards	2021	Himself	Celebrity	Nominated	
CMA Wild and Young Awards	2010	Himself	Best International Male Singer	Won	
CMA Wild and Young Awards	2010	"Whataya Want from Me"	Best International Single	Won	
Chinese Music Awards	2013	Himself	Favorite International Artist	Won	
Classic Rock Roll of Honour Awards	2014	Queen + Adam Lambert	Band of the Year	Won	
Classic Rock Roll of Honour Awards	2017	Queen + Adam Lambert	Tour of the Year	Won	
CMT Music Awards	2016	"Girl Crush" (w/Leona Lewis)	CMT Performance of the Year	Nominated	
Do Something Awards	2011	Himself	Do Something Music Artist	Nominated	
Do Something Awards	2012	Himself	Do Something Music Artist	Nominated	
Dorian Awards	2010	American Music Awards of 2009	TV Musical or Comedy Performance of the Year	Nominated	
Dorian Awards	2019	"Believe" (Live at The 41st Annual Kennedy Center Honors	TV Musical Performance of the Year	Nominated	
Emma Gaala	2010	Himself	People's Choice	Nominated	
Eska Music Awards	2015	Himself	Best Foreign Artist	Won	
Hungarian Music Awards	2011	For Your Entertainment	International Modern Pop/Rock Album of the Year	Won	
Hungarian Music Awards	2013	Trespassing	International Modern Pop/Rock Album of the Year	Nominated	
Hungarian Music Awards	2016	The Original High	International Modern Pop/Rock Album of the Year	Nominated	
GLAAD Media Awards	2010	For Your Entertainment	Outstanding Music Artist	Nominated	
GLAAD Media Awards	2013	Trespassing	Outstanding Music Artist	Won	
GLAAD Media Awards	2013	Himself	Davidson/Valentini Award	Won	
GLAAD Media Awards	2020	Velvet: Side A	Outstanding Music Artist	Nominated	
GLAAD Media Awards	2021	Velvet	Outstanding Music Artist	Nominated	
GLAAD Media Awards	2025	Afters	Outstanding Music Artist	Nominated	
Grammy Awards	2011	"Whataya Want from Me"	Best Male Pop Vocal Performance	Nominated	
International Dance Music Awards	2010	Himself	Best Breakthrough Artist (Solo)	Nominated	
iHeartRadio Music Awards	2016	Glamberts	Best Fan Army	Nominated	
iHeartRadio Music Awards	2025	Cabaret at the Kit Kat Club	Favorite Broadway Debut	Nominated	
MTV Video Music Awards Japan	2010	"Whataya Want from Me"	Best Male Video	Nominated	
Mashable Awards	2011	Himself	Must-Follow Musician on Social Media	Nominated	
Much Music Video Awards	2010	"Whataya Want from Me"	International Video of the Year - Artist	Nominated	
Much Music Video Awards	2010	"Whataya Want from Me"	UR Fave International Video	Won	
Much Music Video Awards	2011	"If I Had You"	MuchMUSIC.COM Most Watched Video	Nominated	
O Music Awards	2011	Himself	Favorite F**k Yeah Tumblr	Won	
O Music Awards	2011	Himself	Must Follow Artist on Twitter	Won	
O Music Awards	2011	Himself	Fan Army FTW	Nominated	
O Music Awards	2012	Himself	Fan Army FTW	Nominated	
O Music Awards	2012	Himself	Must Follow Artist on Twitter	Won	
O Music Awards	2013	Himself	Fan Army FTW	Nominated	
People's Choice Awards	2010	Himself	Favorite Breakout Artist	Nominated	
Silver Clef Awards	2023	Himself	International Award	Won	
Teen Choice Awards	2009	American Idols Live! Tour 2009	Choice Summer Tour	Nominated	
Teen Choice Awards	2009	Himself	Choice Male Reality/Variety Star	Won	
Teen Choice Awards	2009	Himself	Choice Red Carpet Icon – Male	Nominated	
Teen Choice Awards	2010	Himself	Choice Music: Male Artist	Nominated	
Young Hollywood Awards	2009	Himself	Artist of the Year	Won	
