= Glam Nation Live =

Live album by Adam Lambert
- Released: March 22, 2011
- Recorded: August 31, 2010
- Venues: Clowes Memorial Hall, Butler University, Indianapolis, Indiana, United States
- Genres: Pop; dance-pop; pop rock
- Length: 65:47
- Labels: RCA; 19
- Director: Doug Spangenberg

Adam Lambert chronology
Acoustic Live! (2010)	Glam Nation Live (2011)	Beg For Mercy (2011)

Professional ratings
Review scores
Source	Rating
AllMusic	3/5 stars

Glam Nation Live is the first live album by American singer Adam Lambert which was released on March 22, 2011, on DVD and CD formats. The concert was filmed at Clowes Hall in Indianapolis, Indiana during the North American leg of his Glam Nation Tour.

== Track listing ==
DVD and CD track listing
No.	Title	Writer(s)	Length
1.	"Voodoo"	Adam Lambert; Sam Sparro; Jesse Rogg	4:38
2.	"Down the Rabbit Hole"	Greg Wells; Lambert; Evan Bogart	2:41
3.	"Ring of Fire"	June Carter; Merle Kilgore	2:05
4.	"Fever"	Lady Gaga; Jeff Bhasker	3:32
5.	"Tribal Segment"		1:24
6.	"Sleepwalker"	Ryan Tedder; Aimee Mayo; Chris Lindsey	4:59
7.	"Whataya Want from Me"	Pink; Max Martin; Shellback	4:25
8.	"Soaked"	Matt Bellamy	4:36
9.	"Aftermath"	Lambert; Alisan Porter; Ferras; Ely Rise	5:01
10.	"Jamming With Lazers"		4:59
11.	"Sure Fire Winners"	David Gamson; Alex James; Oliver Leiber	3:49
12.	"Strut"	Kara DioGuardi; Wells; Lambert	4:05
13.	"Music Again"	Justin Hawkins	3:54
14.	"Meet My Band"		2:47
15.	"If I Had You"	Martin; Shellback; Savan Kotecha	7:33
16.	"20th Century Boy"	Marc Bolan	5:19

17. Behind the Scenes

== Chart performance ==
The album has sold a total of 24,000 copies in the United States as of April 13, 2011.

Chart (2011)	Peak position
Finnish charts	32
German Media Control Charts	94
Hungarian Albums Chart	16
Japanese DVD Chart (Oricon)	64
Netherlands MegaCharts	99
Recording Industry Association of New Zealand	14
U.S. Billboard Video	1
