= On the Waterfront (disambiguation) =

On the Waterfront is a 1954 film about union violence and corruption among longshoremen. It may also refer to:

- On the Waterfront (festival), an annual Illinois music festival
- On the Waterfront (TV series)
