= Pick U Up =

Pick U Up may refer to:

- "Pick U Up", a 2009 song by Adam Lambert from For Your Entertainment
- "Pick U Up", a 2019 song by Foster the People
