= Wet dream (disambiguation) =

Wet dream is a colloquial expression for nocturnal emission.

Wet Dream may also refer to:

== Music ==
- Wet Dream (album), by Richard Wright, 1978
- "Wet Dream" (Max Romeo song), 1968
- "Wet Dream" (Wet Leg song), 2021
- "Wet Dream", a song by Adam Lambert from Afters, 2024
- "Wet Dream", a novelty song by Kip Addotta, 1984
- "Wet Dreams" (Odetari and Nimstarr song), 2023
- "Wet Dreams", a song by Ocean Alley from Lonely Diamond, 2020
- "Wet Dreams", a song by Pepper from Pink Crustaceans and Good Vibrations, 2008
- "Wet Dreamz", a song by J. Cole, 2014

== Film ==
- Wet Dreams (film), a 2002 South Korean film
- The Wet Dream, a 2005 Iranian film directed by Pouran Derakhshandeh
