= Acoustic Live! (Adam Lambert EP) =

Live extended play by Adam Lambert released in 2010

EP / Live album by Adam Lambert
- Released: December 6, 2010
- Recorded: 2010
- Genres: Pop rock; acoustic rock
- Length: 18:34
- Label: RCA
- Producer: Adam Lambert

Adam Lambert chronology
Remixes (2010)	Acoustic Live! (2010)	Glam Nation Live (2011)

Acoustic Live! is a live extended play by American singer Adam Lambert, released on December 6, 2010. The EP features acoustic versions of four songs from Lambert's debut album, For Your Entertainment, as well as his show-stopping "Mad World" rendition.

== Critical reception ==
The album has since received mostly positive reviews. Jim Farber of NY Daily News remarks that Lambert is "downright operatic in 'Soaked' and as wild as Freddie Mercury on 'Music Again.' All the stripped background does is give Lambert more room to trill and soar." Dan Savoie of Rockstar Weekly gave the album 5 out 5 stars, saying that this acoustic EP better displays "the voice that most fell in love with each week during AI" and that it "is the best representation of Lambert’s voice to date and the CD cover resembles some of the greatest punk rock albums of all time." Lyndsey Parker of Reality Rocks also praises Lambert, saying that the entire EP "thrillingly places Adam's remarkable vocals front-and-center." Lambert's acoustic version of "Mad World" also garnered USA Today's "Pick of the Week" on December 6, 2010, with Jerry Shriver proclaiming that "there's no shortage of electricity or passion. The tale of wanting to escape from a meaningless existence sounds even more urgent as Lambert attacks his acoustic guitar and gives full-throat to that dramatic tenor voice."

== Track listing ==
No.	Title	Writer(s)	Length
1.	"Whataya Want from Me" (Live at ENERGY Berlin 103.4)	Pink; Max Martin; Shellback	3:56
2.	"Music Again" (Live at Hit Radio FFH)	Justin Hawkins	3:15
3.	"Aftermath" (Live at Glam Nation)	Adam Lambert; Alisan Porter; Ferras; Ely Rise	4:21
4.	"Soaked" (Live at Glam Nation)	Matt Bellamy	4:10
5.	"Mad World" (Live at Glam Nation)	Roland Orzabal	2:54

== Chart performance ==
The album sold 10,000 copies in its first week, debuting at number 126 on the Billboard 200, and as of December 22, 2010 has sold a total of 17,000 copies in the United States.

=== Charts ===
Chart (2010)	Peak position
U.S. Billboard 200	126
