= GLAAD Davidson/Valentini Award =

The GLAAD Davidson/Valenti Award is a special GLAAD Media Award presented annually by the Gay & Lesbian Alliance Against Defamation at the GLAAD Media Awards ceremony held in San Francisco. It is named in memory of Craig Davidson, GLAAD's first executive director, and his partner Michael Valentini, a GLAAD supporter. It is presented to an openly LGBT individual who has made a significant difference in promoting equal rights for the LGBT community.

== List of recipients ==
- 2000 – Kathy Levinson
- 2001 – Rob Epstein & Jeffrey Friedman
- 2002 – Sandra Bernhard
- 2003 – BD Wong
- 2004 – Clive Barker
- 2005 – Alec Mapa
- 2006 – Ron Cowen and Daniel Lipman
- 2007 – Robert Gant
- 2008 – Ilene Chaiken
- 2009 – Chad Allen
- 2010 – Lee Daniels
- 2013 – Adam Lambert
- 2015 – Tyler Oakley
- 2016 – Hannah Hart
- 2017 – Don Lemon
- 2018 – Ross Mathews
- 2019 – Dan Levy
