= Sleepwalker (Adam Lambert song) =

Single by Adam Lambert

from the album For Your Entertainment
- Released: March 25, 2011
- Recorded: 2009
- Length: 4:23
- Label: RCA; Jive
- Songwriters: Ryan Tedder; Aimee Mayo; Chris Lindsey
- Producer: Ryan Tedder

Adam Lambert singles chronology
"Aftermath" (2011)	"Sleepwalker" (2011)	"Better Than I Know Myself" (2011)

Audio video
- "Sleepwalker" on YouTube

"Sleepwalker" is a song by American recording artist and American Idol season eight runner-up Adam Lambert. The song was written by Ryan Tedder, Aimee Mayo and Chris Lindsey for Lambert's debut album, For Your Entertainment. The song was written and recorded in 2009. It was released as the seventh and final single from the album on March 25, 2011. Germany was the only selected country where the single was released along with a music video; namely the live performance on the Glam Nation Live live album.

== Critical reception ==
The song received positive reviews. AllMusic called the song "terrific pop" and added that it's "Tedder’s typically icy alienation." Entertainment Weekly was very positive, saying: "Lambert [gets] the chance to earn his power- ballad bona fides on the tense, atmospheric 'Sleepwalker'." However LA Times called the song "a real throwaway."

== Live performances ==
The song was included on the set list of Lambert's 2010 Glam Nation Tour. Lambert also performed the song on The Tonight Show with Jay Leno in late 2010.

== Track listing ==
CD single

1. "Sleepwalker" – 4:25
2. "Aftermath" (Live at Glam Nation) – 4:23

== Personnel ==
- Adam Lambert - vocals
- Ryan Tedder - songwriter and producer
- Aimee Mayo - songwriter
- Chris Lindsey - songwriter
- Orianthi - guitar solo

== Charts ==
Chart (2011)	Peak position
Canada Hot 100 (Billboard)	90
Canada Hot AC (Billboard)	29
Germany (German Singles Chart)	63

== Release history ==
Country	Date	Version
Austria	March 25, 2011	Digital download
Germany	March 25, 2011	Digital download
Switzerland	March 25, 2011	Digital download
Germany	March 25, 2011	CD single
