= Glam Nation Tour =

2010 concert tour by Adam Lambert

- Tour by Adam Lambert
- Promotional poster for Lambert's 2010 tour
- Associated album: For Your Entertainment
- Start date: June 4, 2010
- End date: December 16, 2010
- Legs: 4
- No. of shows: 81 in North America; 10 in Asia; 4 in Oceania; 18 in Europe; 113 total

Adam Lambert concert chronology
- American Idols LIVE! Tour 2009 (2009); Glam Nation Tour (2010); Queen + Adam Lambert Tour 2012 (2012)

The Glam Nation Tour (also known as GlamNation International) was the first headlining concert tour by American singer/songwriter Adam Lambert in support of his debut album, For Your Entertainment. The tour included over 100 shows in North America, Asia, Australia, and Europe.

== Background ==
The tour was officially announced on April 28, 2010 via Lambert's website. To describe the tour, Lambert stated:

"I hope the audience will be able to escape for a few hours and fall into a world full of glam, drama and excitement. I’m confident we’ve put together a show far beyond the price of the ticket. I’m looking forward to connecting with fans all across the world with this show"

Fellow American Idol alum Allison Iraheta, and Orianthi served as opening acts on select dates. In July, Orianthi cancelled several appearances before announcing she was leaving the second half of the tour.

On February 9, 2011, it was confirmed on Lambert's official website that a CD/DVD combo of the tour would be released on March 22, 2011.

== Opening acts ==
- Orianthi (North America) (select dates)
- Allison Iraheta (North America) (select dates)
- Seth Haapu (New Zealand)
- The Monday Box (Finland)
- Viktorious (Sweden)
- Random Hero (Germany)
- Mytoybox (England)
- Carrie Mac (Scotland)
- The Canyons (Los Angeles)

== Set list ==
1. "For Your Entertainment" (Video Introduction)
2. "Voodoo"
3. "Down the Rabbit Hole"
4. "Ring of Fire"
5. "Fever"
6. "Sleepwalker"
7. "Soaked"
8. "Whataya Want from Me"
9. "Aftermath"
10. "Sure Fire Winners"
11. "Strut"
12. "Music Again"
13. "Broken Open"^{1}
14. "If I Had You"

Encore

15. "Mad World"^{1}
16. "Whole Lotta Love"^{1}
17. "20th Century Boy"^{1}
18. "Enter Sandman"^{1}
19. "Purple Haze"^{1}
20. "A Change Is Gonna Come"^{1}

^{1}Performed at select dates

== Tour dates ==
| Date | City | Country | Venue |
|---|---|---|---|
North America
| June 4, 2010 | Wilkes-Barre | United States | Kirby Center for the Performing Arts |
| June 5, 2010 | Sayreville | United States | Starland Ballroom |
| June 6, 2010^{[A]} | Fishkill | United States | Dutchess Stadium |
| June 8, 2010 | Toledo | United States | Omni Midwest |
| June 10, 2010 | Council Bluffs | United States | Stir Concert Cove |
| June 11, 2010 | Mahnomen | United States | Shooting Star Event Center |
| June 12, 2010 | Prior Lake | United States | Mystic Showroom |
| June 14, 2010 | Columbus | United States | Lifestyle Communities Pavilion |
| June 15, 2010 | Milwaukee | United States | Riverside Theater |
| June 17, 2010 | Hammond | United States | The Venue at Horseshoe Casino |
| June 18, 2010 | Royal Oak | United States | Royal Oak Music Theatre |
| June 19, 2010 | Toronto | Canada | Molson Amphitheatre |
| June 22, 2010 | New York City | United States | Nokia Theatre Times Square |
| June 23, 2010 | New York City | United States | Nokia Theatre Times Square |
| June 24, 2010 | Ledyard | United States | MGM Grand Theater |
| June 26, 2010 | Atlantic City | United States | Borgata Event Center |
| June 27, 2010 | Baltimore | United States | Rams Head Live! |
| June 28, 2010 | Washington, D.C. | United States | 9:30 Club |
| June 30, 2010 | Norfolk | United States | The NorVa |
| July 2, 2010 | Charlotte | United States | The Fillmore Charlotte |
| July 3, 2010 | Myrtle Beach | United States | House of Blues |
| July 6, 2010 | Knoxville | United States | Tennessee Theatre |
| July 7, 2010 | Nashville | United States | Ryman Auditorium |
| July 9, 2010 | Cleveland | United States | Allen Theatre |
| July 10, 2010 | Louisville | United States | Brown Theatre |
| July 12, 2010^{[B]} | Chesaning | United States | Chesaning Showboat Amphitheatre |
| July 13, 2010^{[C]} | Lansing | United States | Adado Riverfront Park |
| July 15, 2010 | Kansas City | United States | Midland Theatre |
| July 16, 2010 | Wichita | United States | Cotillion Ballroom |
| July 17, 2010 | Denver | United States | Paramount Theatre |
| July 19, 2010 | Boise | United States | Morrison Center for the Performing Arts |
| July 20, 2010 | Seattle | United States | Showbox SoDo |
| July 21, 2010 | Portland | United States | Crystal Ballroom |
| July 23, 2010 | San Francisco | United States | Warfield Theatre |
| July 24, 2010 | Lincoln | United States | Thunder Valley Casino Outdoor Amphitheater |
| July 25, 2010 | San Francisco | United States | Warfield Theatre |
| July 27, 2010^{[D]} | Costa Mesa | United States | Pacific Amphitheatre |
| July 28, 2010 | Costa Mesa | United States | Pacific Amphitheatre |
| July 30, 2010 | San Diego | United States | Copley Symphony Hall |
| July 31, 2010 | Las Vegas | United States | The Beach at Mandalay Bay |
| August 1, 2010 | Tempe | United States | Marquee Theatre |
| August 3, 2010 | Albuquerque | United States | Sunshine Theater |
| August 4, 2010 | Lubbock | United States | The Pavilion at the Lone Star Event Center |
| August 6, 2010 | Oklahoma City | United States | Coca-Cola Bricktown Events Center |
| August 7, 2010 | Springfield | United States | Juanita K. Hammons Hall |
| August 8, 2010 | St. Louis | United States | The Pageant |
| August 10, 2010 | Erie | United States | Warner Theatre |
| August 12, 2010 | Upper Darby Township | United States | Tower Theater |
| August 13, 2010^{[E]} | Bethelem | United States | Musikfest |
| August 14, 2010^{[F]} | Saint-Jean-sur-Richelieu | Canada | Parc Pierre-Trahan |
| August 16, 2010 | Concord | United States | Capitol Center for the Arts |
| August 17, 2010 | Providence | United States | Lupo's Heartbreak Hotel |
| August 19, 2010 | Hyannis | United States | Cape Cod Melody Tent |
| August 20, 2010 | Cohasset | United States | South Shore Music Circus |
| August 21, 2010 | Hampton Beach | United States | Hampton Beach Casino Ballroom |
| August 23, 2010 | Albany | United States | Palace Theatre |
| August 24, 2010 | Staten Island | United States | St. George Theatre |
| August 26, 2010 | Roanoke | United States | Roanoke Performing Arts Theatre |
| August 27, 2010 | Richmond | United States | The National |
| August 28, 2010 | Raleigh | United States | Raleigh Memorial Auditorium |
| August 30, 2010 | Covington | United States | Madison Theater |
| August 31, 2010 | Indianapolis | United States | Clowes Memorial Hall |
| September 1, 2010 | Evansville | United States | Victory Theatre |
| September 3, 2010 | Des Moines | United States | Simon Estes Riverfront Amphitheater |
| September 4, 2010^{[G]} | Rockford | United States | Davis Park at Founders' Landing |
| September 5, 2010 | Peoria | United States | Peoria Civic Center Theater |
| September 7, 2010 | Dallas | United States | Palladium Ballroom |
| September 8, 2010 | Houston | United States | Sarofim Hall |
| September 10, 2010 | Thackerville | United States | WinStar Global Event Center |
| September 11, 2010 | Tunica | United States | Grand Casino Event Center |
| September 12, 2010 | New Orleans | United States | Jackson Theater of the Performing Arts |
| September 14, 2010 | Atlanta | United States | Atlanta Symphony Hall |
| September 15, 2010 | Atlanta | United States | The Tabernacle |
| September 17, 2010 | Melbourne | United States | King Center for the Performing Arts |
| September 18, 2010^{[H]} | St. Petersburg | United States | Tropicana Field |
| September 19, 2010 | Hollywood | United States | Hard Rock Live |
| September 21, 2010^{[I]} | Puyallup | United States | Columbia Bank Concert Center |
Asia
| September 25, 2010^{[J]} | Marina Bay | Singapore | Marina Bay Street Circuit |
| September 26, 2010^{[J]} | Marina Bay | Singapore | Marina Bay Street Circuit |
| October 3, 2010 | Nagoya | Japan | The Bottom Line |
| October 4, 2010 | Osaka | Japan | Namba Hatch |
| October 6, 2010 | Tokyo | Japan | JCB Hall |
| October 7, 2010 | Tokyo | Japan | JCB Hall |
| October 8, 2010 | Tokyo | Japan | JCB Hall |
| October 10, 2010 | Manila | Philippines | SM Mall of Asia Concert Grounds |
| October 12, 2010 | Kowloon Bay | Hong Kong | Star Hall |
| October 14, 2010 | Kuala Lumpur | Malaysia | Putra Indoor Stadium |
Oceania
| October 17, 2010 | Auckland | New Zealand | Trusts Stadium |
| October 19, 2010 | Melbourne | Australia | Palais Theatre |
| October 20, 2010 | Sydney | Australia | Enmore Theatre |
| October 22, 2010 | Brisbane | Australia | The Tivoli |
North America
| October 25, 2010 | Honolulu | United States | Blaisdell Concert Hall |
| October 26, 2010 | Honolulu | United States | Blaisdell Concert Hall |
Europe
| November 6, 2010 | Helsinki | Finland | Kaapelitehdas |
| November 8, 2010 | Oslo | Norway | Sentrum Scene |
| November 9, 2010 | Stockholm | Sweden | Debaser Medis |
| November 10, 2010 | Copenhagen | Denmark | Vega |
| November 12, 2010 | Munich | Germany | Theaterfabrik München |
| November 14, 2010 | Hamburg | Germany | Gruenspan |
| November 15, 2010 | Berlin | Germany | Fritzclub im Postbahnhof |
| November 16, 2010 | Stuttgart | Germany | Theaterhaus |
| November 18, 2010 | Paris | France | Le Trabendo |
| November 19, 2010 | Cologne | Germany | Gloria-Theater |
| November 20, 2010 | Amsterdam | Netherlands | Paradiso |
| November 22, 2010 | Vienna | Austria | WUK Saal |
| November 23, 2010 | Zürich | Switzerland | X-Tra Limmathaus |
| November 24, 2010 | Milan | Italy | Magazzini Generali |
| November 26, 2010 | Birmingham | England | O_{2} Academy Birmingham |
| November 27, 2010 | Manchester | England | Manchester Academy |
| November 28, 2010 | Glasgow | Scotland | O_{2} ABC |
| November 29, 2010 | London | England | O_{2} Shepherd's Bush Empire |
North America
| December 15, 2010 | Los Angeles | United States | The Music Box |
| December 16, 2010 | Los Angeles | United States | Club Nokia |

Music festivals and other miscellaneous performances

^{A} This concert is a part of the 2010 WSPK K*Fest
^{B} This concert is a part of the 2010 Chesaning Showboat Music Festival
^{C} This concert is a part of the 11th Annual Common Ground Music Festival
^{D} This concert is a part of The 2010 Orange County Fair
^{E} This concert is a part of The 2010 Musikfest
^{F} This concert is a part of the 2010 International de Montgolfières de Saint-Jean-sur-Richelieu
^{G} This concert is a part of The 2010 On the Waterfront Festival
^{H} This concert is a part of The 2010 Rays Summer Concert Series
^{I} This concert is a part of The 2010 Puyallup Fair
^{J} These concerts are a part of the 2010 Formula 1 Singtel Singapore Grand Prix

Rescheduled shows

| October 4, 2010 | Osaka, Japan | Big Cat | This performance was moved to Namba Hatch |
| October 5, 2010 | Nagoya | Club Diamond Hall | This performance was moved rescheduled for October 3, 2010 to The Bottom Line |
| October 19, 2010 | Melbourne | Palace Theatre | This performance was moved to the Palais Theatre |
| October 20, 2010 | Sydney | Virgin Mobile Metro Theatre | This performance was moved to the Enmore Theatre |

=== Box office score data ===
| Venue | City | Tickets sold / available | Gross revenue |
|---|---|---|---|
| Starland Ballroom | Sayereville | 2,005 / 2,005 (100%) | $71,178 |
| Stir Concert Cove | Council Bluffs | 3,741 / 3,741 (100%) | $138,417 |
| Lifestyle Communities Pavilion | Columbus | 2,183 / 2,200 (99%) | $76,405 |
| Riverside Theater | Milwaukee | 2,354 / 2,354 (100%) | $91,218 |
| The Venue at Horseshoe Casino | Hammond | 2,819 / 3,027 (93%) | $126,855 |
| Royal Oak Music Theatre | Royal Oak | 1,700/ 1,700 (100%) | $59,500 |
| Nokia Theatre Time Square | New York City | 4,300 / 4,300 (100%) | $147,210 |
| 9:30 Club | Washington, D.C. | 1,200 / 1,200 (100%) | $48,000 |
| Brown Theatre | Louisville | 1,383 / 1,383 (100%) | $50,101 |
| Midland Theatre | Kansas City | 2,538 / 2,538 (100%) | $88,830 |
| Coalition Ballroom | Wichita | 1,840 / 1,840 (100%) | $67,871 |
| Paramount Theatre | Denver | 1,602 / 1,602 (100%) | $63,279 |
| Morrison Center for the Performing Arts | Boise | 1,871 / 1,994 (94%) | $72,218 |
| Crystal Ballroom | Portland | 1,479 / 1,479 (100%) | $51,830 |
| Warfield Theatre | San Francisco | 4,550 / 4,550 (100%) | $161,832 |
| Pacific Amphitheatre | Costa Mesa | 16,084 / 16,084 (100%) | $426,733 |
| Marquee Theatre | Tempe | 1,550 / 1,550 (100%) | $57,764 |
| Sands Riverplace | Bethlehem | 6,500 / 6,500 (100%) | $204,695 |
| Roanoke Performing Arts Theatre | Roanoke | 1,896 / 1,896 (100%) | $75,366 |
| Raleigh Memorial Auditorium | Raleigh | 2,328 / 2,328 (100%) | $92,538 |
| Madison Theater | Covington | 1,578 / 1,660 (100%) | $55,230 |
| Clowes Memorial Hall | Indianapolis | 2,082 / 2,086 (99%) | $69,747 |
| Victory Theater | Evansville | 1,768 / 1,768 (100%) | $60,112 |
| Peoria Civic Center Theater | Peoria | 2,079 / 2,079 (100%) | $76,923 |
| Grand Casino Event Center | Tunica | 2,350 / 2,400 (98%) | $95,399 |
| King Center for the Performing Arts | Melbourne | 1,964 / 1,964 (100%) | $72,688 |
| Blaisdell Concert Hall | Honolulu | 3,988 / 4,286 (93%) | $255,134 |
| TOTAL | | 79,732 / 80,514 (99%) | $2,857,055 |

== Broadcast and recordings ==
It was announced on February 9, 2011 that a CD/DVD compilation entitled Glam Nation Live will be released. The show was recorded on the August 31st date in Indianapolis at Clowes Memorial Hall. The concert was directed by Doug Spangenberg and will "feature 12 tracks plus a bonus cut."

== Personnel ==
- Choreographer: Brooke Wendle
- Musical Director: Monte Pittman
- Make-up Artist: Sutan Amrull

Band

- Dancers: Taylor Green, Sasha Mallory, Terrance Spencer and Brooke Wendle
- Drums: Longineu W. Parsons III (June 4 – September 15), Isaac Carpenter (September 17 – December 16)
- Guitar: Monte Pittman
- Bass guitar: Tommy Joe Ratliff
- Keyboards: Camila Grey
- Supporting Vocals: Camila Grey and Monte Pittman
