= Time for Miracles =

2009 song by Adam Lambert

Single by Adam Lambert

from the album For Your Entertainment and 2012: Original Motion Picture Soundtrack
- Released: October 18, 2009
- Recorded: July 2009–September 2009 in Los Angeles, California
- Genre: Pop rock
- Length: 4:43
- Label: RCA
- Songwriters: Alain Johannes; Natasha Shneider
- Producer: Rob Cavallo

Adam Lambert singles chronology
"No Boundaries" (2009)	"Time for Miracles" (2009)	"For Your Entertainment" (2009)

Audio video
- "Time for Miracles" on YouTube

"Time for Miracles" is a song recorded by American singer Adam Lambert, released on October 16, 2009. Although it was Lambert's first release since finishing as runner-up in the eighth season of American Idol, it was not his official debut single. Written by Alain Johannes and Natasha Shneider, the song is featured in the end credits of the 2009 disaster film 2012 and is included on the film's soundtrack. A full version of the song was released on October 17, 2009, via YouTube and on October 20, 2009, via digital download.

== Reception ==
Before "Time for Miracles" was released to the public, it had already garnered positive reviews.

Brian May of Queen was able to listen to the full track and praised the song as "truly sensational" and complimented Lambert's vocals, stating, "Adam's voice reaches out with sensitivity, depth, maturity, and awesome range and power that will make jaws drop all around the world."

Having heard only the preview of the track, Entertainment Weekly's Michael Slezak stated that the song "sounds like it has the potential to be a power-ballad smash".

== Music video ==
The official music video was released on October 21, 2009, through Myspace. The video portrays Lambert walking placidly through a disaster scene, like those portrayed in 2012. Footage from the film and the clips of Adam singing are edited together.

Another music video, popularized on YouTube does not show Lambert at all, but rather a disaster sequence showing the lead characters of the film attempting to escape the destruction of Los Angeles, California.

In the movie, a slightly different version of the song is played during the closing credits.

== Chart performance ==
On the chart week ending November 7, 2009, "Time for Miracles" debuted at number 50 on the Billboard Hot 100. In the United States, the song has sold 124,000 legal digital downloads.

Chart (2009)	Peak position
Canada Hot 100 (Billboard)	26
Japan (Japan Hot 100)	82
US Billboard Hot 100	50
