= Velvet: Side A =

2019 Adam Lambert extended play

EP by Adam Lambert
- Released: September 27, 2019
- Genre: Funk; rock; dance; soul; pop; R&B
- Length: 20:22
- Label: More Is More; Empire
- Producer: Tommy English; Steve Booker; Noise Club; Butch Walker; Fred Ball

Adam Lambert chronology
Spotify Sessions (2016)	Velvet: Side A (2019)	Velvet: Side A (The Live Sessions) (2020)

Singles from Velvet: Side A
- 1. "Superpower" Released: September 4, 2019

Velvet: Side A is the fourth extended play by American singer Adam Lambert, released through More Is More and Empire Distribution on September 27, 2019. It features six songs from his fourth studio album Velvet. The lead single, "Superpower", was released on September 4, 2019.

== Background ==
With the record featuring a "'70s funk vibe", Lambert stated that he wanted to make an album that was "a slight homage to that period and all the different types of music that I heard growing up" as well as to "hear instruments in my music again, to feel a little more analog. When I get on stage to perform it, I wanted it to be able to be recreated with live players."

== Critical reception ==
Professional ratings
Review scores
Source	Rating
AllMusic	4/5 stars
The Irish News	8/10

Reviewing the EP for the Associated Press, Wayne Parry wrote that it "toggl[es] effortlessly among dance club thump, guitar-driven rock, '70s funk and power-ballad drama", commenting that the EP displays one of the reasons why Lambert was successful on American Idol—his "deep knowledge of and appreciation for vastly different genres of music — and the ability to kill at all of them". Lucy Mapstone of The Irish News rated the EP 8 out of 10 and called it "dripping with glitter and soul and pop and funk and R&B and dance and everything else this former American Idol star could possibly throw at it, but without the tracks becoming too over-worked and clunky".

== Track listing ==
No.	Title	Writer(s)	Producer	Length
1.	"Superpower"	Adam Lambert; Ilsey Juber; Thomas Schlieter	Tommy English	3:10
2.	"Stranger You Are"	Lambert; Kes; Steve Booker	Steve Booker	2:52
3.	"Closer to You"	Lambert; Asia Whiteacre; Robert McCurdy; Christopher Petrosino	Noise Club	4:19
4.	"Overglow"	Lambert; Amy Kuney; Butch Walker; Uzoechi Emenike	Butch Walker	3:32
5.	"Loverboy"	Lambert; Gabe Simon; Schlieter; Angelo Petraglia	English	3:20
6.	"Ready to Run"	Lambert; Kes; Fredrik Ball	Fred Ball	3:09
Total length:				20:22

== Charts ==
Chart (2019)	Peak position
Australian Albums (ARIA)	72
Scottish Albums (OCC)	42
US Billboard 200	148
US Digital Albums (Billboard)	7
US Independent Albums (Billboard)	5

== Velvet: Side A (The Live Sessions) ==
Velvet: Side A (The Live Sessions)

EP / Live album by Adam Lambert
- Released: January 10, 2020
- Length: 20:39
- Label: More Is More; Empire
- Producer: Tommy English; Steve Booker; Noise Club; Butch Walker; Fred Ball

Adam Lambert chronology
Velvet: Side A (2019)	Velvet: Side A (The Live Sessions) (2020)	Velvet (2020)

Velvet: Side A (The Live Sessions) is the sixth extended play (and second Live EP after 2010's Acoustic Live!) by American recording artist Adam Lambert. It serves as a companion to his 2019 extended play Velvet: Side A, the first part of his forthcoming fourth studio album Velvet. It was released on January 12, 2020 through More Is More and Empire Distribution.

=== Track listing ===
No.	Title	Writer(s)	Producer	Length
1.	"Superpower"	Lambert; Juber; Schlieter	English	3:09
2.	"Stranger You Are"	Lambert; Kes; Booker	Booker	3:10
3.	"Closer to You"	Lambert; Whiteacre; McCurdy; Petrosino	Noise Club	4:30
4.	"Overglow"	Lambert; Kuney; Walker; Emenike	Walker	3:32
5.	"Loverboy"	Lambert; Simon; Schlieter; Petraglia	English	3:19
6.	"Ready to Run"	Lambert; Kes; Ball	Ball	3:09
Total length:				20:39
