= Fever (Adam Lambert song) =

2009 song by Adam Lambert

Single by Adam Lambert

from the album For Your Entertainment
- Released: September 2010
- Recorded: October 18, 2009
- Studio: Record Plant (Hollywood)
- Genre: Disco; electropop; dance-pop
- Length: 3:24
- Label: RCA; 19
- Songwriters: Stefani Germanotta; Rob Fusari; Jeff Bhasker
- Producer: Jeff Bhasker

Adam Lambert singles chronology
"If I Had You" (2010)	"Fever" (2010)	"Aftermath" (2011)

Audio video
- "Fever" on YouTube

"Fever" is a song by American singer Adam Lambert, written by Lady Gaga, Rob Fusari and Jeff Bhasker, with the latter also producing it. It was recorded for Lambert's debut studio album, For Your Entertainment (2009). The song originated as a demo recorded by Gaga a few years earlier, which she offered to Lambert after being approached to contribute material to his album. "Fever" has been described as a disco, electropop, and dance-pop song. It is characterized by prominent synthesizers and a falsetto chorus, with lyrics addressing a male love interest.

Music critics praised "Fever" for Lambert's vocal performance, its songwriting, and its overt sexuality, although some considered it derivative of Gaga's work or criticized its lyrics. The song was released to radio in New Zealand in September 2010, and peaked at number 19 on the New Zealand Singles Chart. Lambert included the track on several of his concert tours. Gaga had also performed "Fever" live in 2006, a few years before he recorded it.

== Background and recording ==
Lady Gaga (left) originally co-wrote "Fever" for herself, later offering it to Adam Lambert (right), believing that the song suited him better.

"Fever" was written by Lady Gaga, Rob Fusari and Jeff Bhasker, with the latter also producing the song. It appears on Adam Lambert's debut studio album, For Your Entertainment, released in 2009 after he finished as the runner-up on the eighth season of American Idol. According to Lambert, the song originated as a demo Gaga had recorded three or four years before their collaboration. Gaga had been unable to record a version she was satisfied with. Although Gaga had previously seen Lambert backstage when she performed on American Idol, she said that she did not know him personally. Lambert's team later contacted her because he wanted her to write a song for his debut album; Gaga already had "Fever" and believed that it would suit him and had the potential to become a hit, prompting the pair to work on the song together in the studio. According to Gaga, Lambert responded enthusiastically when she played it for him. Gaga explained that she approached the collaboration as a songwriter rather than a fellow recording artist. She emphasized that she wanted the focus to remain on Lambert as he launched his recording career: "It's Adam's time and it's his song and I want him to enjoy this moment in his life. You never debut again. You only get one time."

Recording for the song took place on October 18, 2009. Lambert confirmed his collaboration with Gaga on Twitter the following day. In a later interview, he recalled that the session occurred the day after Gaga finished filming the music video for "Bad Romance" and that she arrived wearing a newspaper-print coat from the video over lingerie. Lambert said that the song was a last-minute addition to the album and that Gaga's original demo sounded substantially different from the finished recording. He later shared that Gaga had told him the demo dated back to her first record deal and had never been fully produced. Although she did not perform on the recording, Gaga encouraged him from the other side of the studio glass. Lambert credited Gaga with pushing him to his vocal limits, recalling her encouragement: "Go crazier! Go higher! Go louder!" The pair continued recording after drinking whiskey, and he remarked that the song "captures us partying".

== Composition ==
"Fever"
A 20-second sample of the song's chorus, featuring Lambert's falsetto vocals over prominent synthesizers.

"Fever" has been described as a disco, electropop, and dance-pop song. Lambert said that he and Gaga deliberately sought to update the sound of her original demo, with Gaga suggesting that they "dance it up" and make it "a little more disco-y". Lambert later described "Fever" as being about "getting groovy" and having a disco feel, while also capturing "the spirit of rock and roll". In an interview with The Wall Street Journal, he called the track's melody "really catchy" and its lyrics "really fun and silly".

The recording includes drums by Abe Laboriel Jr., guitar by Brian Ray, and programming by Henry Strange. The chorus features falsetto vocals. Sarah Rodman of The Boston Globe noted the song's prominent synthesizers and compared its sound to the Scissor Sisters, a comparison also made by Leah Greenblatt of Entertainment Weekly, who described the track as "future-disco". Jonathan Keefe of Slant Magazine interpreted the lyrics as being about an erection, while Steven Hyden of The A.V. Club described the song as "Lady Gaga's ode to wanton debauchery". Stephen Thomas Erlewine of AllMusic also noted that the lyrics retain a male object of affection.

== Critical reception ==
Ben Rayner of the Toronto Star described "Fever" as an "out-and-proud club stomper" on which Lambert's "larger-than-life pipes do shine". Joe Vogel of The Huffington Post identified it as one of the songs that fulfilled Lambert's aim of creating music for dancing and having fun. Despite reservations about its originality, Slant Magazine's Keefe praised the songwriting and felt that it gave Lambert an "opportunity to shine". Adam Graham of The Detroit News commended the song's bold sexuality and suggested that its opening lines could provoke a reaction from the more conservative members of Lambert's American Idol fan base.

AllMusic's Erlewine considered the song an album highlight, calling it "terrific", while The Boston Globe's Maura Johnston characterized it as a "sleaze-glitter anthem". Ann Powers of the Los Angeles Times found it stronger than some of the album's other tracks, describing it as a "straight-ahead, guilt-free cry of love". Jon Caramanica of The New York Times singled out "Fever" as a notable exception in his assessment of the album, arguing that Gaga's success demonstrated an openness to experimentation with pop identity that Lambert rarely exploited. Chris Azzopardi of Between the Lines praised Lambert's delivery and the song's unabashed sexuality.

Michael Cragg of musicOMH found the song "disappointing", arguing that Lambert imitated his collaborators rather than establishing his own musical identity. Allison Stewart of The Washington Post compared "Fever" to an "unexceptional Gaga track" and criticized its lyrics as "awful".

== Live performances ==
Lady Gaga performed "Fever" at The Cutting Room in New York City in 2006, two years before releasing her debut album. Lambert performed the song at the Gridlock New Year's Eve party in Los Angeles on December 31, 2009, where he remarked to the audience that it had been recorded "under the influence", joking that Gaga was to blame.

Lambert included "Fever" in the setlist for his Glam Nation Tour (2010). Reviewing the tour's show at Shepherd's Bush Empire in London, Caroline Sullivan of The Guardian wrote that the song did not need the dancers' "bumping and grinding" to convey Lambert's desire for an uninterested partner. A performance of the song recorded at Clowes Hall in Indianapolis on August 31, 2010, was included on Lambert's live album and concert video Glam Nation Live, released on March 22, 2011.

Lambert continued to perform "Fever" on later tours, including the We Are Glamily Tour (2013) and The Original High Tour (2016). Reviewing the latter's show at the Orpheum Theatre in Los Angeles, Mikael Wood of the Los Angeles Times called the song a "disco throwaway" and said that Lambert sounded like "the world's most overqualified wedding singer" during the song.

== Single release ==
"Fever" was released to radio in New Zealand in September 2010. This coincided with promotion for Lambert's Glam Nation Tour, which was extended to Oceania during the final quarter of 2010. The song peaked at number 19 on the New Zealand Singles Chart and remained on the chart for 11 weeks.

== Credits and personnel ==
Credits are adapted from the liner notes of For Your Entertainment.

=== Management ===
- Recorded at Record Plant Studios, Hollywood, California
- Mixed at Chalice Recording Studios, Los Angeles, California
- House of Gaga Publishing, Inc./Sony/ATV Songs LLC (BMI)
- Way Above Music/Sony/ATV Songs LLC (BMI)

=== Personnel ===
- Adam Lambert – vocals
- Lady Gaga – songwriting
- Rob Fusari – songwriting
- Jeff Bhasker – composition, production
- Abe Laboriel Jr. – drums
- Brian Ray – guitar
- Henry Strange – programming
- Anthony Kilhoffer – assistant recording
- Ghazi Hourani – assistant engineer, phase operator
- Mark "Spike" Stent – mixing engineer
- Matty Green – assistant engineer

== Charts ==
Chart performance for "Fever"
Chart (2010)	Peak position
New Zealand (Recorded Music NZ)	19

== Release history ==
"Fever" release history
Region	Date	Format	Ref.
New Zealand	September 2010	Airplay	
