= Take One (Adam Lambert album) =

Demo album by Adam Lambert
- Released: November 17, 2009
- Recorded: 2005
- Genre: Pop rock
- Length: 56:04
- Label: Rufftown

Adam Lambert chronology
Season 8 Favorite Performances (2009)	Take One (2009)	For Your Entertainment (2009)

Singles from Take One

Take One is the non-official debut studio album by American singer and American Idol season eight runner-up Adam Lambert, consisting of pre-Idol recordings Lambert made while working as a session musician, but released post-Idol. It was released on November 17, 2009. The album had sold 48,000 copies in the United States.

== Album information ==
This album is a collection of recordings Lambert made in 2005 while working as a session musician. Take One was released in the same month as his post-Idol debut, For Your Entertainment.

Lambert issued a statement through 19 Entertainment stating, "Back in 2005 when I was a struggling artist, I was hired as a studio singer to lend my vocals to tracks written by someone else. I was broke at the time and this was my chance to make a few bucks, so I jumped at the opportunity to record for my first time in a professional studio. The work I did back then in no way reflects the music I am currently in the studio working on."

== Critical reception ==
Professional ratings
Review scores
Source	Rating
AllMusic	2/5 stars
eMusic	3.5/5 stars

Critical response to Take One has been mixed. AllMusic said that "The songs aren’t horrible but they’re not memorable and neither are Lambert’s performances, but that’s unfair to him: these recordings were designed to sell middle-of-the-road pop with commercial aspirations and have absolutely no room for flair, since the whole point is to showcase the lyric and melody. Lambert acquits himself in that regard, sounding like nothing more than a demo singer because that was, after all, what he was".

== Track listing ==
All tracks are written by Michael Burtscher.

No.	Title	Length
1.	"Climb"	4:39
2.	"December"	3:29
3.	"Fields"	3:42
4.	"Did You Need It"	5:09
5.	"More Than"	3:16
6.	"Wonderful"	4:19
7.	"Castle Man"	5:04
8.	"Hourglass"	4:49
9.	"Light Falls Away"	7:12
10.	"First Light"	2:39
11.	"Want" (December Remix)	3:27
12.	"Spotlight" (Did You Need It Remix)	4:22
13.	"On with the Show" (Fields Remix)	4:06

== Personnel ==
- Malcolm Welsford – producer, engineer, mixing
- John Armstrong – assistant engineer
- Mark Endert – additional production
- Bernie Grundman – mastering
- Adam Lambert – vocals
- Marcus Brown – bass, keyboards
- Stuart Pearce – arranger
- Monte Pittman – guitar
- Steve Sidelnyk – drums
- Emma Bogren – images, graphics

== Chart performance ==
Chart (2009)	Peak position
U.S. Billboard 200	72
U.S. Billboard Top Independent Albums	6

== Release history ==
Year	Release date	Type	Label	Catalogue
2009	November 17, 2009	CD	Rufftown	20097
