= Season 8 Favorite Performances =

Compilation album by Adam Lambert
- Released: May 20, 2009
- Genres: Rock; pop
- Length: 39:01
- Label: 19

Adam Lambert chronology
Season 8 Favorite Performances (2009)	Take One (2009)

Professional ratings
Review scores
Source	Rating
AllMusic	4/5 stars

Season 8 Favorite Performances is a compilation album by American singer Adam Lambert based on his American Idol performances. The album was released digitally through iTunes and consists of studio recordings made by Lambert during season 8 of American Idol. It does not include live performances at the Nokia Theater in Los Angeles. A similar album was also released through iTunes by season 8 winner Kris Allen. It sold 16,000 on its first week, and has sold 35,000 by July 23, 2009.

== Background ==
This digital-only album is a collection of studio recordings of songs performed on American Idol by Adam Lambert. Starting from Top 13 of the final rounds of the competition, each contestant recorded a studio version of the song that they had performed live on stage. These recordings were released immediately after the result show each week and made available for download exclusively via iTunes. No sales information however were released for the recordings so as not to prejudice the competition. At the end of the season, a collection of these recordings were made available as separate albums for both the winner and the runner-up, namely Kris Allen and Adam Lambert. These albums were made available immediately after the season finale on May 20, 2009.

This album contains studio versions of some live performances by Adam Lambert such as "Mad World", "Tracks of My Tears", and "Ring of Fire". Adam's version of "Mad World" is based on Gary Jules' interpretation of the Tears for Fears' song from the film Donnie Darko. Gary Jules himself praised Adam's performance of "Mad World", that he had delivered the song "in a unique and beautiful way". His "Ring of Fire" is a further elaboration of Dilana's version of the Johnny Cash song, while his "Feeling Good" was inspired by Muse's version of the song.

== Track listing ==
No.	Title	Original artist(s)	Length
1.	"Black or White"	Michael Jackson	2:59
2.	"Born to Be Wild"	Steppenwolf	2:53
3.	"Cryin'"	Aerosmith	4:27
4.	"Feeling Good"	Cy Grant	3:21
5.	"If I Can't Have You"	Yvonne Elliman	3:54
6.	"Mad World"	Tears for Fears	3:04
7.	"One"	U2	4:08
8.	"Play That Funky Music"	Wild Cherry	3:27
9.	"Ring of Fire"	Anita Carter	3:02
10.	"The Tracks of My Tears"	The Miracles	3:02
11.	"Whole Lotta Love"	Led Zeppelin	3:24
12.	"A Change Is Gonna Come"	Sam Cooke	3:50

== Charts ==
Chart (2009)	Peak position
U.S. Billboard 200	33
U.S. Billboard Top Independent Albums	4

== Chart performance and sales of individual album tracks ==
No chart position and sales information were released during the competition, therefore these figures are only for sales and chart positions attained after the finale.

Single	Hot 100 Peak	Hot 100 Bubbling Under	Hot digital songs	Sales
"Mad World"	19	—	7	256,000
"A Change Is Gonna Come"	56	—	32	63,000
"One"	82	—	57	46,000
"Cryin'"	—	2	75	35,000
"The Tracks of My Tears"	—	17	102	26,000
"Feeling Good"	—	21	107	25,000
"Ring of Fire"	—	—	112	23,000
"Whole Lotta Love"	—	—	113	14,000
"Black or White"	—	—	141	11,000
"If I Can’t Have You"	—	—	145	11,000
"Born to Be Wild"	—	—	155	11,000
"Play That Funky Music"	—	—	186	9,000
