= For Your Entertainment (Adam Lambert song) =

2009 single by Adam Lambert

Single by Adam Lambert

from the album For Your Entertainment
- Released: October 30, 2009
- Recorded: September–October 2009
- Studio: Los Angeles, California
- Genre: Dance-pop; synth-pop
- Length: 3:35
- Label: RCA
- Songwriters: Claude Kelly; Lukasz Gottwald
- Producer: Dr. Luke

Adam Lambert singles chronology
"Time for Miracles" (2009)	"For Your Entertainment" (2009)	"Whataya Want from Me" (2009)

Music video
- "For Your Entertainment" on YouTube

"For Your Entertainment" is the debut mainstream single by the American recording artist and American Idol season eight runner-up Adam Lambert. Written by Claude Kelly and Dr. Luke, it serves as the title track to his debut album, For Your Entertainment (2009). The song was released commercially on November 3, 2009, and became a top 10 hit in Finland, Japan, New Zealand and the US Dance Club chart.

Lambert's performance of the song at the 2009 American Music Awards prompted complaints from the Parents Television Council and ABC canceled Lambert's scheduled performance on Good Morning America. A remixed version of the song was added to the set list of Lambert's first concert tour, the 2010 Glam Nation Tour as the show's opening.

== Background ==
In 2009, Lambert auditioned for the eighth season of American Idol. Praised for his theatricality and vocal range, he quickly became a fan favorite, and despite some controversy and conservative backlash, Lambert remained popular, receiving positive media coverage and support from LGBTQ+ outlets, while being widely seen as a frontrunner to win the season. He advanced to the top three and ultimately finished as the runner-up. His runner-up single, "No Boundaries," was released alongside winner Kris Allen's version. On June 9, 2009, 19 Entertainment announced that Lambert had signed with a record deal with 19 Recordings and RCA Records and was prepping his debut album for a fall release.

A&R executive Ashley Newton and Iain Pirie at 19 Entertainment helped Lambert selecting collaborators for his album, including Dr. Luke, who would co-pen and produce on "For Your Entertainment." Lambert commented on the song: "It's real sexy, very contemporary dance-pop. It has a dark, mysterious electro sound to it and lyrically there's definitely a double meaning. It's me saying, "Here I am, I'm going to put on a show". He also noted that the song reflects his musical theatre influences, drawing comparisons to pieces like "Wilkommen" from Cabaret, and felt it captured his artistic style; calling it "dance music with a glam-rock shuffle beat, in the style of T. Rex and 'Rock & Roll, Part 2.'"

== Critical reception ==
Critics gave mixed reviews to "For Your Entertainment," with some praising its disco/glam energy, danceable vibe, and Lambert's vocals, while others found it derivative. Joe Vogel from The Huffington Post noted that "For Your Entertainment" was a "full-display" of album that "operates from a disco/glam aesthetic of escapism and liberation via dance, dress-up, and desire" and added that it "fully accomplish what the singer had in mind for the album: songs that make you want to let loose, dance, work out, have fun." AllMusic editor Stephen Thomas Erlewine called the song "cool" and "strutting" and marked it as one of his highlights on the album. Eric Ditzian from MTV News wrote: "There are echoes of Lady Gaga, countless '80s tunes and, during the chorus, "Fame." He doesn't show off his vocal range until the end, when he unleashes some of his signature yells."

Leah Greenblatt from Entertainment Weekly opined that "the peacocking title track [that] follows duly fulfills its pledge", while The Detroit News called it "pulsating" and praised the vocals. Chicago Tribune critic Greg Kot wrote that "For Your Entertainment" promises to "get rough with you". Boston Globe editor Sarah Rodman noted that this "less-than-compelling wink-wink, Britney-evoking throb-pop" track doesn't have "enough time to adjust itself from opening track." Jonathan Keefe from Slant Magazine called the song "less successful" and felt that it was so "similar to Sam Sparro's "Black and Gold" that 19 Entertainment should probably keep a strong legal team on retainer." Some critics noted that the song was about S&M.

== Performances ==
"For Your Entertainment" made its live debut at the American Music Awards on November 22, 2009, at the Nokia Theatre in Los Angeles, California, which aired on ABC. The performance caused controversy due to Lambert acting too provocative on stage by aggressively grinding on his male dancers and making out with his keyboardist. The Parents Television Council (PTC) slammed the performance as being sexualized, and urged viewers to complain to the Federal Communications Commission (FCC) if living in an area where the performance was shown before 10 p.m. local time. However, Lambert's performance reportedly was broadcast around 11 p.m. Eastern and Pacific time, "outside the FCC's usual 6am-10pm time frame". The performance drew 1,500 complaints to ABC, many of which probably came from the PTC.

As a result, ABC announced that Lambert would not be performing on Good Morning America on November 25 as planned. CBS subsequently invited Lambert to perform instead on The Early Show on the same date in New York City. In an interview with Rolling Stone, Lambert reflected on the performance and the public reactions to it: "Female performers have been doing this for years — pushing the envelope about sexuality — and the minute a man does it, everybody freaks out. We're in 2009 — it's time to take risks, be a little more brave, time to open people's eyes and if it offends them, then maybe I'm not for them. My goal was not to piss people off, it was to promote freedom of expression and artistic freedom." Lambert then went on a series of promotional interviews and performances to address the controversy, clear up rumors, discuss his rapid rise to fame, and promote the album. He was interviewed on The Ellen DeGeneres Show, The View, and The Oprah Winfrey Show.

== Chart performance ==
On October 28, 2009, Lambert announced via Twitter that the song would serve as the lead single from his debut album. He later also disclosed that it would make its debut on the radio program On Air with Ryan Seacrest on October 30, 2009. "For Your Entertainment" debuted at number 84 on the US Billboard Hot 100 chart in the week of November 28, 2009. It eventually peaked at number 61 in the week ending December 12, 2009. The song fared better on Billboard's Dance Club Songs, reaching number five in March 2010. By August 2010, it had sold approximately 333,000 digital downloads, according to Nielsen Soundscan.

"For Your Entertainment" charted highest in Finland and Japan, reaching number five and number two on their respective charts. The song also enjoyed commercial success in Canada and New Zealand, where it achieved platinum and gold status respectively. It debuted at number 33 on the Canadian Hot 100, before peaking at number 23. In New Zealand, the song reached number ten on the New Zealand Singles Chart. In Australia, it reached 32 on the ARIA charts and was also certified gold by the Australian Recording Industry Association (ARIA). In the United Kingdom, "For Your Entertainment" entered the UK Singles Chart on May 2, 2010, at number 39. It peaked at number 37 in its third week on the chart.

== Music video ==
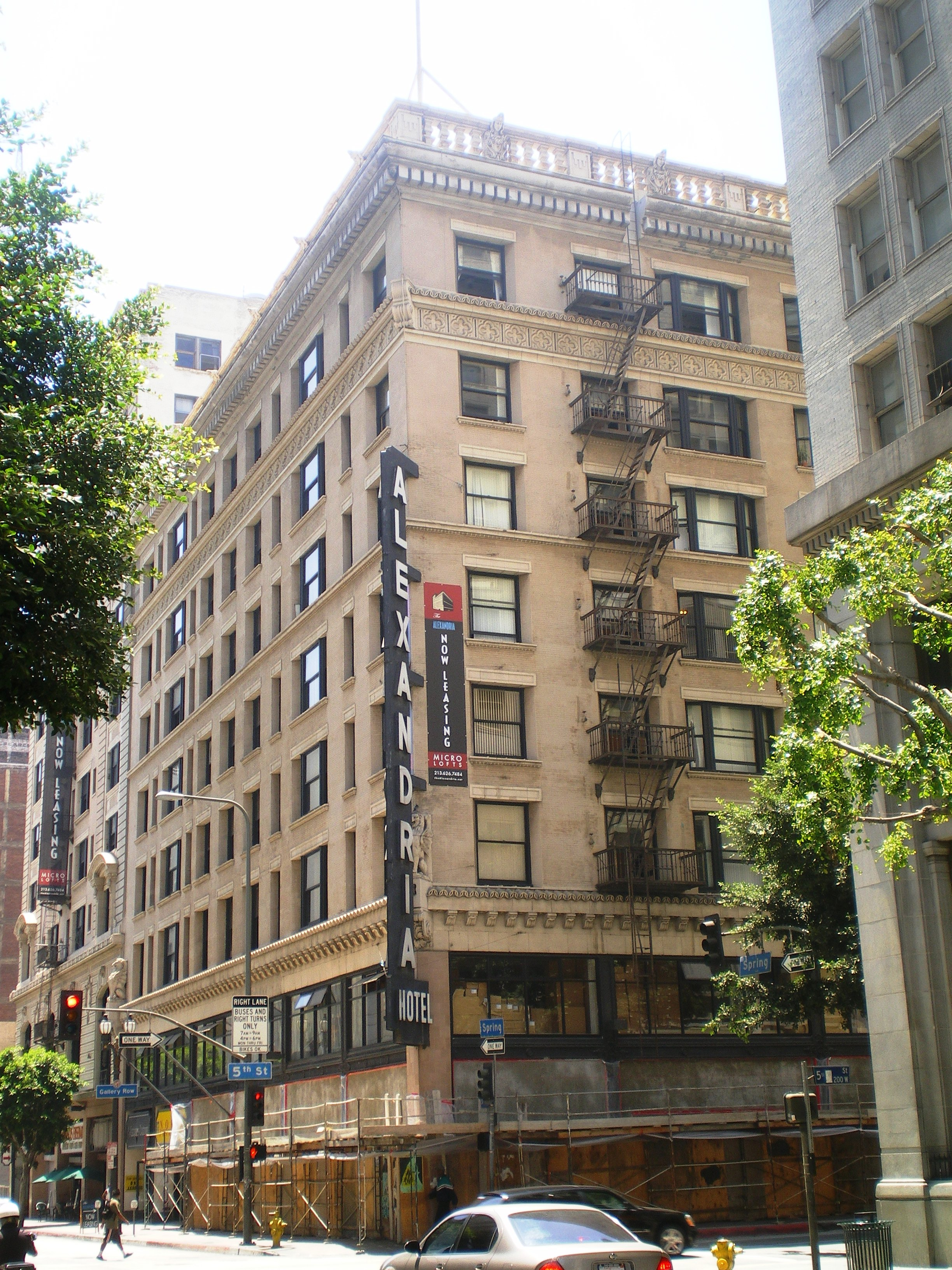
"For Your Entertainment" was filmed at Hotel Alexandria in Downtown Los Angeles.

Directed by Norwegian filmmaker Ray Kay, the music video for "For Your Entertainment" was filmed on November 15, 2009, at The Alexandria, a historic Downtown Los Angeles hotel now converted into apartments. It features Lambert hitting an underground club. The singer noted that the video shares a similar energy, styling, and choreography to his controversial performance at the 2009 American Music Awards, though he found that it was less graphic and largely created in an impromptu manner. In an interview with MTV News, Lambert also acknowledged that certain elements were edited out during post-production following his performance at the awards ceremony. The visuals premiered on Lambert’s official website on November 24, 2009. Shortly after, the website crashed due to overloaded entries.

The video opens with a nighttime street level shot in a city. As the camera pans down below the ground, Lambert is shown walking into an underground club, filled with scantily clad men and women. As he begins singing, he walks through the crowd and interacts and dances with others. Mixed with dancing are close up shots of Lambert and various dancers. Towards the end of the song, Lambert begins to play with his band and the video shows everyone in the club dancing. As the song ends, the camera pans back up to the street level where life is continuing on, completely oblivious of what is going on below the streets.

== Use in popular culture ==
Starting December 22, 2009, Fox began using "For Your Entertainment" as the official song highlighting their January television show line-up. E! Network in February 2010 aired a commercial promoting their television line-up with a remix of "For Your Entertainment". It was also featured in an advertisement for 4music in the United Kingdom in 2010. In addition, the BBC used it in a montage of the 'best and worst of the crucible 2010'. It also was featured as a VIP Track on the UK's 4Music, prior to the album's release.

== Track listing ==
Digital download

1. "For Your Entertainment" – 3:35

Remixes (Part of Remixes album)

- "For Your Entertainment" (Bimbo Jones Vocal Mix) - 6:29
- "For Your Entertainment" (Brad Walsh Remix) - 4:56

== Charts ==
=== Weekly charts ===
Contemporaneous weekly chart performance
Chart (2009–2010)	Peak position
Australia (ARIA)	32
Canada Hot 100 (Billboard)	23
Finland (Suomen virallinen lista)	5
Japan (Japan Hot 100)	2
New Zealand (Recorded Music NZ)	10
Scottish Singles Sales (Official Charts)	24
UK Singles (Official Charts)	37
US Billboard Hot 100	61
US Dance Club Songs (Billboard)	5

Weekly chart performance five years later
Chart (2014)	Peak position
Finland Airplay (Radiosoittolista)	85

=== Year-end charts ===
Year-end chart performance
Chart (2010)	Position
Canada (Canadian Hot 100)	98
Japan (Japan Hot 100)	34
Japan Adult Contemporary (Billboard Japan)	78

== Certifications ==
Certifications and sales
Region	Certification	Certified units/sales
Australia (ARIA)	Gold	35,000^{^}
Canada (Music Canada)	Platinum	10,000^{^}
New Zealand (RMNZ)	Gold	7,500^{*}
^{*} Sales figures based on certification alone.^{^} Shipments figures based on certification alone.

== Release history ==
Release history
Region	Date	Format	Ref.
United States	October 27, 2009	Digital download	
Belgium	October 31, 2009	Digital download	
France	October 31, 2009	Digital download	
Luxembourg	October 31, 2009	Digital download	
Canada	October 31, 2009	Digital download	
Netherlands	October 31, 2009	Digital download	
Sweden	November 2, 2009	Digital download	
United States	November 3, 2009	Contemporary hit radio	
Spain	November 3, 2009	Digital download	
Italy	November 6, 2009	Digital download	
Finland	November 9, 2009	Digital download	
Norway	November 9, 2009	Digital download	
Portugal	November 9, 2009	Digital download	
Australia	December 4, 2009	Digital download	
Austria	November 13, 2009	Digital download	
United Kingdom	April 23, 2010	Digital download	
Ireland	April 23, 2010	Digital download	
