= On the Waterfront (festival) =

Music festival in Rockford, Illinois, United States

Coordinates: 42°15′34″N 89°03′52″W

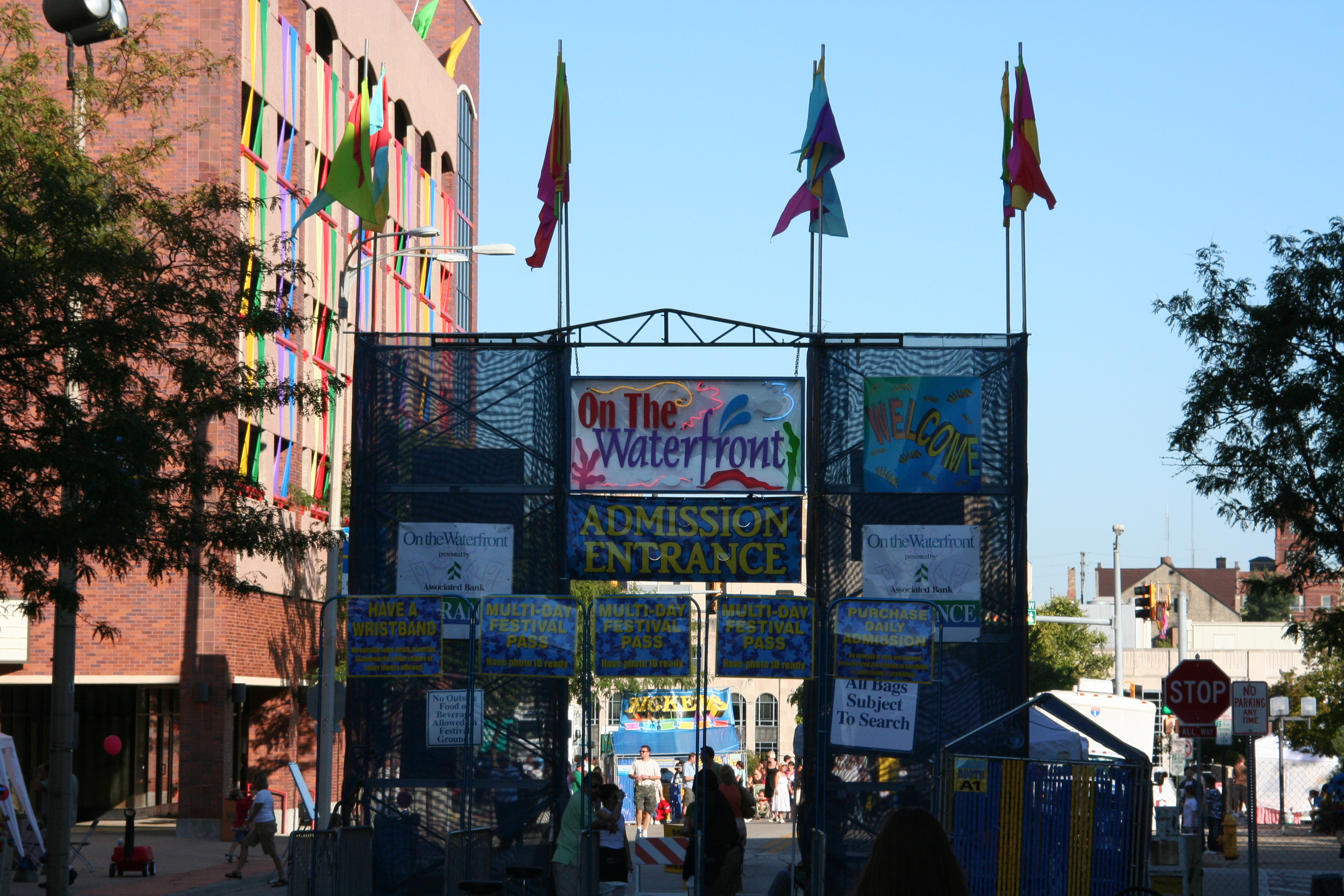
- An entrance into the festival.
- Genre: Rock, Alternative rock, Rap, Punk rock, Country music
- Dates: Labor Day weekend
- Locations: Rockford, Illinois, United States
- Years active: 1984–2012
- Founders: City of Rockford

On the Waterfront was an annual outdoor music festival held in downtown Rockford, Illinois on Labor Day weekend. The festival featured local and national performers in various genres including rock, country, alternative rock, hip hop, and punk rock, as well as food vendors and craft booths.

== History ==
On the Waterfront originated in 1983, during an economic downturn in Rockford, when city officials approved $15,000 for a celebration of the city's 150th anniversary. The annual festival began in 1984.

By its 25th edition in 2008, On the Waterfront was described as Illinois's largest music festival. The previous year's event had attracted more than 70,000 people, and the 2008 edition included about 130 performers on seven stages and more than 50 food booths. Nonprofit organizations operated many of the festival's food, drink, and ticket booths. A 2017 profile published by the International Festivals & Events Association reported that more than 200 nonprofits earned $10.1 million over the festival's run.

The 29th and final festival took place over Labor Day weekend in 2012. The final edition sold 51,000 three-day passes, an 11 percent decline from the previous year and down from nearly 80,000 at the festival's peak. In December, the board of On the Waterfront Inc. ended the event. The organization had accumulated $344,000 in debt after several years of deficits, and organizers cited rising security and talent costs.
