= For Your Entertainment (album) =

Studio album by Adam Lambert
- Released: November 23, 2009
- Recorded: May–October 2009
- Genres: Pop; pop rock; dance-pop
- Length: 57:24
- Labels: RCA; 19
- Producers: Howard Benson; Jeff Bhasker; Rob Cavallo; Dr. Luke; Kristian Lundin; Max Martin; Linda Perry; Jesse Rogg; Shellback; Ryan Tedder; Greg Wells

Adam Lambert chronology
Take One (2009)	For Your Entertainment (2009)	Remixes (2010)

Adam Lambert studio album chronology
For Your Entertainment (2009)	Trespassing (2012)

Singles from For Your Entertainment
- 1. "For Your Entertainment" Released: October 27, 2009; 2. "Whataya Want from Me" Released: November 20, 2009; 3. "If I Had You" Released: May 11, 2010; 4. "Fever" Released: September 17, 2010; 5. "Aftermath" Released: March 8, 2011; 6. "Sleepwalker" Released: March 25, 2011

For Your Entertainment is the debut studio album by American singer Adam Lambert, released on November 23, 2009, by RCA Records. He started recording the album in May 2009, shortly after the end of the eighth season of American Idol, where he finished in second place. During the recording sessions, Lambert enlisted various pop and rock producers, such as Rob Cavallo, Dr. Luke, Max Martin, Kristian Lundin, Shellback, Greg Wells, Linda Perry, Jeff Bhasker, Ryan Tedder and Howard Benson.

A pop record, For Your Entertainment consists of six songs co-written by Lambert, while also having contributions from fellow artists Pink, Lady Gaga, Orianthi and Justin Hawkins. Following its release, album received primary positive reviews from music critics, with The Washington Post calling it "an instant classic". Commercially, For Your Entertainment peaked inside the top ten in seven countries, including Australia, Canada and the United States, where it reached third spot on the Billboard 200 chart and eventually was certified Gold by Recording Industry Association of America.

Three singles have been released from the album worldwide: "For Your Entertainment", "Whataya Want from Me" and "If I Had You", with the second reaching the top ten positions in sixteen countries. Three more singles were released from the record in selected countries, with each having a moderate success. The album was supported by Lambert's first concert tour, the 2010 Glam Nation Tour.

== Background ==
Lambert began his professional career at age 19, performing on a cruise ship for ten months with Anita Mann Productions. He later appeared in light opera productions in Orange County, California, and by age 21 had signed with a manager and joined a European tour of Hair. Lambert subsequently joined the first national touring production of Wicked in 2005 as an understudy for Fiyero and ensemble member, and later appeared in the Los Angeles production in 2007, finishing his run in 2008. During this period, he also fronted the underground rock band The Citizen Vein and worked as a demo singer and session musician, with some of his recordings later being released without authorization.

In 2009, Lambert auditioned for the eighth season of American Idol. Praised for his theatricality and vocal range, he quickly became a fan favorite, and despite some controversy and conservative backlash, Lambert remained popular, receiving positive media coverage and support from LGBTQ+ outlets, while being widely seen as a frontrunner to win the season. He advanced to the top three and ultimately finished as the runner-up. His runner-up single, "No Boundaries," was released alongside winner Kris Allen's version. After the finale, Season 8 Favorite Performances, his 12-song set, reached number 33 on the US Billboard 200 chart and sold a total of 35,000 copies.

== Development ==
On June 9, 2009, 19 Entertainment announced that Lambert had signed with a record deal with 19 Recordings and RCA Records and was prepping his debut album for a fall release. A&R executive Ashley Newton and Iain Pirie at 19 Entertainment helped Lambert select collaborators for the album, including Max Martin, Dr. Luke, Justin Hawkins, Matt Bellamy of Muse, Rivers Cuomo, and Linda Perry. Lambert also contributed a significant portion of his own writing to the album, though much of the material was sourced from established songwriters and producers to accommodate the fast-paced production schedule. Despite the tight timeline, six of the songs he co-wrote were ultimately included on the album, including "Strut," "Pick U Up," "Voodoo," "Down the Rabbit Hole," "Aftermath," and "Broken Open."

Among the numerous songs prepared for the album were also leftover tracks from Lady Gaga and Pink. Although Gaga had written "Fever" some time earlier and had not completed a version to her satisfaction, she felt it matched Lambert's style and offered it for his recording. Pink co-wrote and recorded "Whataya Want from Me" but chose not to include it on her fifth studio album Funhouse (2008) for personal reasons, feeling that she did not want to explore the song’s sentiment herself. Another song from Justin Hawkins titled "Suburban Decay" was also considered for the album, but Lambert decided not to record it, saying it was too different than the rest of the album. Lambert also collaborated with producer RedOne, who initially hoped to place at least six songs on For Your Entertainment though none of their tracks ultimately appeared on the final album. Stylistically, Lambert cited glam rock as a key influence, along with contemporary bands such as The Killers and Muse, describing the album as "as if a '70s time capsule blasted off into space and you're watching it through a holographic filter."

== Promotion ==
To promote the album's release, several songs from the album were performed live on AOL Sessions. Following his controversial performance at the American Music Awards of 2009 (AMAs), Lambert was dropped from a few scheduled performances on the American Broadcasting Company (ABC) network, though CBS subsequently invited Lambert for an interview and performance on The Early Show in New York City instead. On November 25, 2009, Lambert performed his single "Whataya Want from Me" on the Late Show with David Letterman. He later appeared on The Tonight Show with Conan O'Brien on December 14, 2009, and performed his single. He provided another live performance two days later on the season finale of So You Think You Can Dance. Earlier that day, he appeared on Chelsea Lately, with host Chelsea Handler.

Lambert appeared for the first time on The Jay Leno Show on December 21, 2009, giving a lengthy interview and performing "Whataya Want from Me". He was invited back in March 2010 to close the second episode of The Tonight Show featuring Jay Leno, with a performance of the song "Sleepwalker" from his debut album. Lambert performed his newly released single "If I Had You" on Leno's May 21, 2010, show. Lambert then went on a series of promotional interviews and performances to address the controversy, clear up rumours, discuss his rise to fame, and promote the album. Interviews included The Ellen DeGeneres Show, The View, and The Oprah Winfrey Show.

During the spring of 2010, Lambert undertook a series of promotional interviews in Europe and Asia to promote the international release ofFor Your Entertainment . A few days prior, he was interviewed for the Fuse TV On the Record segment. In March, as part of his swing through Australia to promote his album, he performed on So You Think You Can Dance, as well as the popular morning show Sunrise. Lambert also did a series of television appearances in Japan, as part of his Asian and European promotional tour.

In the same month, Lambert was selected to inaugurate the newly resurrected award-winning VH1 Unplugged concert series, for which he interviewed as well as performed stripped-down versions of five songs from the album. March 2010 also saw him as a featured artist on ABC News Nightline's Playlist segment, in which he discussed his musical influences and favorite tracks. In May 2010, he returned to Ellen to perform "If I Had You". Lambert performed an acoustic version of "Whataya Want from Me" on Ellen's February 10, 2011 show. Lambert returned to the American Idol stage for the March 10, 2011 results show, singing an acoustic version of his song "Aftermath." After the performance, a dance remix version was made available for purchase, with proceeds benefitting The Trevor Project.

=== Tour ===
In support of the album, Lambert embarked on his first headlining world solo tour entitled The Glam Nation Tour. The tour travelled across North America, New Zealand, Australia, Asia and Europe, before finishing with two final shows in Los Angeles, California. The tour began with a sold-out show at the Kirby Sports Center in Wilkes-Barre, Pennsylvania. Opening acts were Allison Iraheta and Orianthi for the North American leg of the tour.

== Critical reception ==
Professional ratings
Aggregate scores
Source	Rating
Metacritic	71/100
Review scores
Source	Rating
AllMusic	4/5 stars
The A.V. Club	B
Chicago Tribune	2.5/4 stars
Entertainment Weekly	B+
Los Angeles Times	3/4 stars
Now	3/5 Ns
Rolling Stone	3/5 stars
Slant Magazine	3.5/5 stars
Spin	3.5/5 stars
Toronto Star	2/4 stars

Critical response to For Your Entertainment was generally positive. At Metacritic, which assigns a normalized rating out of 100 to reviews from mainstream critics, the album has received an average score of 71, based on 10 reviews. In 2010, Lambert received a nomination for a GLAAD Media Award for Outstanding Music Artist at the 21st GLAAD Media Awards.

Joe Vogel from The Huffington Post called the album "an instant classic." He stated that "as a whole, For Your Entertainment marks one of the most impressive mainstream pop album debuts in recent memory [...] From its kitschy cover to its memorable hooks, Lambert's appropriately labeled album contains all the elements of a successful—and influential—pop-rock classic." AllMusic editor Stephen Thomas Erlewine found that "Lambert sounds larger than life on these [song], just like he wants to be, and if there's no sense of danger here, at least there's a lot of pure pop pleasure here, more than any immediate post-Idol album has ever delivered." Spin said the album is "perhaps the strongest, most flavorful batch of tunes to reach an AI vet, and Lambert's polymorphous vocal skills unite dancefloor strut and hard-rock pomp in a convincing glam package." Los Angeles Times critic Ann Powers called For Your Entertainment a "polished affair, but stylistically, it shows Lambert running loose like a kid in a Comme des Garçons store." Leah Greenblatt, writing for Entertainment Weekly, wrote that "if For Your Entertainment's material sometimes wears him rather than vice versa, he's still the belle of what turns out to be one heck of a glitter-pop ball," while Steven Hyden from The A.V. Club concluded that "Lambert's ambition and undeniable vocal chops make it easy to forgive an occasionally over-reaching record that ultimately feels like a rough draft for an interesting career."

Slant Magazine's Jonathan Keefe criticized the album for derivative and awkward songs but praised "Fever" and "Whataya Want from Me" as standout, well-crafted pop tracks, concluding that "Lambert's music sounds current in a way that Idol albums rarely do." Less impressed, Jody Rosen from The Rolling Stone wrote that "the songs sound great but feel strangely stuffy — Entertainment seems like a disc that was overthought. Next time, the hugely talented Lambert should make sure he's going straight for the gut." Now's Benjamin Boles felt that Lambert was "at his best when he's at his gayest. Yeah, the straight-up rock songs are fine, but when he indulges his appetite for over-the-top theatrics, you really see what he’s capable of." Boston Globe critic Sarah Rodman remarked that "Lambert's got the goods to sell a lot of styles, but the songs don't always showcase those goods in the best light." Chicago Tribune critic Greg Kot found that For Your Entertainment felt "anticlimactic after Lambert's Idol run and described it as a "series of hedged bets. It stuffs Lambert into a box of formulas that keep his musical flamboyance in check" and "firmly in the middle of the road." Jon Caramanica from The New York Times called the album an "overwrought, clunky, only sparingly entertaining record, constantly in argument with itself. Worse, For Your Entertainment isn't an ambitious flop, it's a conservative one. Mr. Lambert doesn't reach for unconventional song structures or lyrical conceits or even, apart from a few places, for the astral high notes he made his trademark."

== Commercial performance ==
In the United States, For Your Entertainment debuted and peaked at number three on the Billboard 200, selling 198,000 copies in its first week. A steady seller, it remained on the chart for 50 weeks. On June 22, 2010, the album was certified gold by the Recording Industry Association of America (RIAA) for domestic shipments figures of over 500,000 copies. The same year, Billboard ranked it 29th on its Billboard 200 year-end listing. In April 2015, the magazine reported that For Your Entertainment had sold 863,000 in the United States, according to Nielsen Soundscan. In Canada, the album peaked at number seven on the Canadian Albums Chart. It was certified gold by Music Canada on January 26, 2010 and reached platinum status on March 24, 2010 with recording shipments of upwards of 80,000 copies.

For Your Entertainment was released across Europe between April and June 2010, being successful mostly in Finland, Germany, Greece, and Sweden peaking at number 4, number 16, number 5 and number 8 respectively. It later earned a gold certification in Finland from Musiikkituottajat, with sales surpassing 12,000 copies. The album first appeared in the United Kingdom on November 20, 2009, as an import-only release, reaching number 80 on the UK Albums Chart. After its official release on May 3, 2010, it re-entered and peaked at number 36 the following week. Nearly 14 years after its release, on August 18, 2023, the album was awarded a Silver certification by the British Phonographic Industry (BPI).

For Your Entertainment was released in Australia on March 5, 2010, and debuted inside the top 20 in its first week on the Australian Albums Chart. After the success of singles "Whataya Want from Me" and "If I Had You," it went on to be certified gold by the Australian Recording Industry Association (ARIA), later being accredited platinum status for selling over 70,000 copies in Australia. In New Zealand, the album also reached gold status. For Your Entertainment also enjoyed success across Asia, with success in Japan also. As of January 2011, the album has sold over 1.2 million units worldwide, while all singles tracks from the albums have a sales total of 4.2 million units worldwide.

== Track listing ==
Standard edition
No.	Title	Writer(s)	Producer(s)	Length
1.	"Music Again"	Justin Hawkins	Rob Cavallo	3:16
2.	"For Your Entertainment"	Lukasz Gottwald; Claude Kelly	Dr. Luke	3:35
3.	"Whataya Want from Me"	Pink; Max Martin; Shellback	Martin; Shellback	3:47
4.	"Strut"	Kara DioGuardi; Greg Wells; Adam Lambert	Wells	3:29
5.	"Soaked"	Matt Bellamy	Cavallo	4:33
6.	"Sure Fire Winners"	David Gamson; Alex James; Oliver Leiber	Cavallo	3:33
7.	"A Loaded Smile"	Linda Perry	Perry	4:04
8.	"If I Had You"	Martin; Shellback; Savan Kotecha	Martin; Shellback; Kristian Lundin	3:48
9.	"Pick U Up"	Rivers Cuomo; Wells; Lambert	Wells	4:00
10.	"Fever"	Stefani Germanotta; Rob Fusari; Jeff Bhasker	Bhasker	3:26
11.	"Sleepwalker"	Ryan Tedder; Aimee Mayo; Chris Lindsey	Tedder	4:26
12.	"Aftermath"	Lambert; Alisan Porter; Ferras; Ely Rise	Howard Benson	4:26
13.	"Broken Open"	Wells; Lambert; Evan "Kidd" Bogart	Wells	5:03
14.	"Time for Miracles" (bonus track)	Alain Johannes; Natasha Shneider	Cavallo	4:42

Australian edition bonus track
No.	Title	Writer(s)	Producer(s)	Length
15.	"Voodoo"	Adam Lambert; Sam Sparro; Jesse Rogg	Rogg	3:13

iTunes Store deluxe edition bonus tracks
No.	Title	Writer(s)	Producer(s)	Length
15.	"Master Plan"	Ryan Tedder; Dave Roth; Pat Benzner; David Jost	Tedder	3:21
16.	"Down the Rabbit Hole"	Greg Wells; Lambert; Evan Bogart	Wells	4:04
17.	"Behind the Scenes at the Photo Shoot" (Video)			2:13
18.	"Behind the Scenes at the Studio" (Video)			3:07

Asian edition bonus tracks
No.	Title	Writer(s)	Producer(s)	Length
17.	"No Boundaries"	DioGuardi; Cathy Dennis; Mitch Allan	Emanuel Kiriakou	3:48
18.	"Voodoo"	Adam Lambert; Sam Sparro; Jesse Rogg	Rogg	3:13

Tour edition, European edition and Asian Glam Box edition bonus tracks
No.	Title	Writer(s)	Producer(s)	Length
17.	"Voodoo"	Adam Lambert; Sam Sparro; Jesse Rogg	Rogg	3:13
18.	"Can't Let You Go"	Greg Wells; Claude Kelly	Rogg	4:14

European digital deluxe edition bonus track
No.	Title	Writer(s)	Length
19.	"For Your Entertainment" (Brad Walsh Remix)	Kelly; Dr. Luke	4:56

European iTunes Store deluxe edition bonus track
No.	Title	Writer(s)	Length
19.	"For Your Entertainment" (Bimbo Jones Vocal Mix)	Kelly; Dr. Luke	6:29

Asian edition and European iTunes Store deluxe edition (bonus DVD)
No.	Title	Length
1.	"Behind the Scenes at the Photo Shoot"
2.	"Behind the Scenes in the Studio"
3.	"The Making of "For Your Entertainment" music video"
4.	"The Making of "Whataya Want From Me" music video"
5.	"For Your Entertainment" (music video)
6.	"Whataya Want from Me" (music video)

Tour edition and Asian Glam Box edition (bonus DVD)
No.	Title	Length
1.	"Music Again" (Stripped)
2.	"Sleepwalker" (Stripped)
3.	"For Your Entertainment" (Stripped)
4.	"Soaked" (Sessions@AOL)
5.	"If I Had You" (Sessions@AOL)
6.	"Whataya Want from Me" (Sessions@AOL)
7.	"Strut" (Sessions@AOL)
8.	"Fever" (Sessions@AOL)
9.	"If I Had You" (Music video)
10.	"For Your Entertainment" (Music video)
11.	"Whataya Want from Me" (Music video)
12.	"Making of 'If I Had You'" (music video)

Asian Glam Box edition bonus CD (If I Had You remixed EP)
No.	Title	Length
1.	"If I Had You" (radio mix)	3:47
2.	"If I Had You" (Jason Nevins extended mix)	6:44
3.	"If I Had You" (Jason Nevins Robotronic extended mix)	6:17
4.	"If I Had You" (Dangerous Muse remix)	5:51
5.	"If I Had You" (Morgan Page extended remix)	7:53

Remixes
No.	Title	Writer(s)	Length
1.	"Whataya Want from Me" (Fonzerelli Electro House Club Mix)	Pink; Martin; Shellback	5:51
2.	"Whataya Want from Me" (Brad Walsh a Vivir Mix)	Pink; Martin; Shellback	4:31
3.	"Whataya Want from Me" (Jason Nevins Electrotek Extended Mix)	Pink; Martin; Shellback	6:22
4.	"For Your Entertainment" (Bimbo Jones Vocal Mix)	Kelly; Dr. Luke	6:29
5.	"For Your Entertainment" (Brad Walsh Remix)	Kelly; Dr. Luke	4:56
6.	"If I Had You" (Jason Nevins Radio Edit)	Martin; Kotecha; Shellback	3:44

== Charts ==
=== Weekly charts ===
Chart (2009–2010)	Peak position
Australian Albums (ARIA)	5
Austrian Albums (Ö3 Austria)	22
Belgian Albums (Ultratop Flanders)	56
Canadian Albums (Billboard)	7
Danish Albums (Hitlisten)	30
Dutch Albums (Album Top 100)	25
Finnish Albums (Suomen virallinen lista)	4
French Albums (SNEP)	106
German Albums (Offizielle Top 100)	16
Greek International Albums (IFPI)	5
Hungarian Albums (MAHASZ)	21
Irish Albums (IRMA)	60
Italian Albums (FIMI)	65
Japanese Albums (Oricon)	29
New Zealand Albums (RMNZ)	5
Portuguese Albums (AFP)	26
Scottish Albums (Official Charts)	36
Swedish Albums (Sverigetopplistan)	8
Swiss Albums (Schweizer Hitparade)	34
UK Albums (Official Charts)	36
US Billboard 200	3

=== Year-end charts ===
Chart (2010)	Position
Australian Albums (ARIA)	40
Canadian Albums (Billboard)	25
New Zealand Albums (RMNZ)	14
US Billboard 200	29

== Certifications ==
Region	Certification	Certified units/sales
Australia (ARIA)	Platinum	70,000^{‡}
Canada (Music Canada)	Platinum	80,000^{^}
Finland (Musiikkituottajat)	Gold	12,353
New Zealand (RMNZ)	Platinum	15,000^{^}
United Kingdom (BPI)	Silver	60,000^{‡}
United States (RIAA)	Gold	500,000^{^}
^{^} Shipments figures based on certification alone.^{‡} Sales+streaming figures based on certification alone.

== Release date ==
For Your Entertainment release history
Region	Date	Format	Label	Ref(s)
United Kingdom	November 20, 2009	RCA Records	Digital download	
United States	November 23, 2009	RCA Records	CD; digital download	
Canada	November 23, 2009	Sony Music	CD; digital download	
Philippines	November 23, 2009	Sony Music	CD	
Brazil	January 28, 2010	Sony Music	CD	
Australia	March 5, 2010	Sony Music	CD; digital download	
Japan	March 10, 2010	Sony Music	CD; digital download	
Argentina	April 13, 2010	Sony Music	CD	
Netherlands	April 30, 2010	Sony Music	CD	
Finland	May 1, 2010	Sony Music	CD	
United Kingdom	May 3, 2010	RCA Records	CD	
Italy	June 1, 2010	RCA Records	CD; digital download	
Japan	September 22, 2010	Sony Music	CD+DVD	
Australia	October 1, 2010	Sony Music	CD+DVD	
United Kingdom	October 25, 2010	Sony Music	CD+DVD	
