= Aftermath (Adam Lambert song) =

Single by Adam Lambert

from the album For Your Entertainment
- Released: March 8, 2011
- Recorded: 2010
- Genre: Pop rock
- Length: 4:23
- Label: RCA; Jive
- Songwriters: Adam Lambert; Alisan Porter; Ferras Alqaisi; Ely Rise
- Producers: Howard Benson; Billboard (remix)

Adam Lambert singles chronology
"Fever" (2010)	"Aftermath" (2011)	"Sleepwalker" (2011)

Audio video
- "Aftermath" on YouTube

Audio video
- "Adam Lambert - Aftermath (Billboard Remix - Pseudo Video)" on YouTube

"Aftermath" is a song by American pop vocalist and American Idol season eight runner-up Adam Lambert. The song was written by Lambert, Alisan Porter, Ferras, Ely Rise and produced by Howard Benson for Lambert's debut album, For Your Entertainment. It was released as a charity single on March 10, 2011.

== Background ==
'Aftermath' is a rock-anthem that shows Lambert's range - with his lower register very prominent and his now-familiar riffing on the high notes.

The message in the lyrics to 'Aftermath' is touching without being maudlin. It is, as Lambert has said, a self-empowerment anthem. "And what better song to bring attention to the Trevor Project while also providing encouragement and support to LGBTQ youth and anyone with self-esteem issues[?]"

== Critical reception ==
The album version received mixed reviews. Slant Magazine praised the vocals: "he favorably recalls some of the strongest '80s hair-metal vocalists like Axl Rose and David Coverdale. It's a style that suits Lambert well since it capitalizes on his vocal power and his flair for the dramatic." AllMusic called this song "anonymous" and "anthemic AAA pop." Detroit News disliked this song:"less effective than others (...) kind of "keep pushing on" claptrap every "Idol" album seems to be saddled with." Huffington Post wasn't positive and compared: "perhaps the lone glaringly weak track, hearkening regrettable Idol anthems like "No Boundaries."

However, the remix version was met with positive reviews. Robbie Daw from Idolator said, "We're digging the dreamy feel of the Billboard remix of "Aftermath," particularly the parts where Adam's upper range is more prevalent. That said, we love the album version, too, and we really can't place one above the other." Pat Ryder said, "Maybe it's not perfect, but overall 'Aftermath: Remix' is a good effort by Billboard. Clearly Lambert is happy with the mix and eager to promote it to bring attention to the universal message and to the Trevor Project".

== Live performances ==
The song was performed on Lambert's 2010 Glam Nation Tour during the "ballad" section of the show. Lambert also performed an acoustic rendition of the song on American Idol in 2011.

== Track listing ==
Digital download

1. "Aftermath (Billboard Remix)" – 5:24

== Personnel ==
- Adam Lambert - songwriter and vocals
- Alisan Porter - songwriter
- Ferras - songwriter
- Ely Rise - songwriter
- Howard Benson - producer

== Release history ==
Country	Date	Version
Worldwide	March 8, 2011	Digital download
