= Whataya Want from Me =

2009 single by Adam Lambert

Single by Adam Lambert

from the album For Your Entertainment
- Released: November 2009
- Recorded: 2009
- Studio: Maratone (Stockholm); House of Blues (Los Angeles); Germano (New York City)
- Genre: Pop rock
- Length: 3:47
- Label: 19; RCA
- Songwriters: Max Martin; Pink; Karl Schuster
- Producers: Max Martin; Shellback

Adam Lambert singles chronology
"For Your Entertainment" (2009)	"Whataya Want from Me" (2009)	"If I Had You" (2010)

Audio sample
- "Whataya Want from Me": file; help

Music video
- "Whataya Want from Me" on YouTube

"Whataya Want from Me" is a song by American recording artist Adam Lambert from his debut studio album, For Your Entertainment (2009). The pop rock track was written by Pink, along with its producers Max Martin, and Shellback. Pink originally recorded the song for her fifth studio album, Funhouse (2008), but it was left off because she felt it did not fit the album's thematic focus. Her version later appeared on certain editions of her greatest hits compilation, Greatest Hits... So Far!!! (2010).

After being excluded from Funhouse, the song was offered to Lambert. His version was released as the second single from his album. "Whataya Want from Me" charted within the top 10 of the charts in thirteen countries and also peaked at number ten on the US Billboard Hot 100, becoming his highest charting and only top 10 single yet. Well-received by music critics, it earned Lambert a Grammy nomination for Best Male Pop Vocal Performance at the 53rd awards ceremony.

A music video for "Whataya Want from Me," directed by Diane Martel and filmed in Los Angeles, depicts Lambert in a tense, unseen relationship. The song was later included on the set list of Lambert's first concert tour, the 2010 Glam Nation Tour where he performed an acoustic rendition of it during the "ballad" section of the show. "Whataya Want from Me" is also featured as one of the numbers in & Juliet, a 2019 jukebox musical.

== Background ==
"Whataya Want from Me" was written by singer Pink along with its producers, Swedish musicians Max Martin and Shellback. Recorded for her fifth studio album Funhouse (2008), it was left off because the album centered on her relationship with her husband Carey Hart, and she felt it would not align with that focus. After it was left off that album it was passed on to Lambert for inclusion on his debut album For Your Entertainment after he had signed a record deal with 19 Recordings and RCA Records. In 2010, her version, featuring slightly altered lyrics, appeared exclusively on the German and Australian releases of her first greatest hits compilation album, Greatest Hits... So Far!!! though.

Lambert recorded "Whataya Want From Me" with Martin and Shellback on a day off from the American Idols Live! arena tour. In an interview with The Hollywood Reporter, he commented on the session: "I was pretty wiped out due to the show schedule. I knew the song would be a key track on my album and it was my first time working with the incredible Max Martin and Shellback, so I was a bit apprehensive." Lambert further elaborated that the "vocal ad libs at the end were the most challenging as they are quite high and it had been a long day. When I heard the first mix, I felt really confident the song would have success thanks to the flawless production."

== Critical reception ==
"Whataya Want from Me" has received generally favorable reviews. Jonathan Keefe from Slant Magazine praised the song and called it "phenomenally well-crafted pop single(s) that give Lambert the opportunity to shine". AllMusic editor Stephen Thomas Erlewine called "Whataya Want from Me" a "terrific pop tune" and "P!nk's pained [song]". Digital Spy's Ryan Love called "Whataya Want from Me" one of "the standout tracks from his debut album and added: "There's no denying that Lambo puts his own glittery stamp on the track with a mighty, falsetto-laced vocal performance." Brendon Veevers from Renowned for Sound concluded that: "Lambert has an incredible and extremely versatile voice as well as a real musical flare and "Whataya Want from Me" portrays just that [...] It's quality and quantity fantastically combined."

Leah Greenblatt from Entertainment Weekly was also positive by calling it "hooky, heartfelt lament", while Ann Powers from The Los Angeles Times praised the singing as "pleading and soulful." Joe Vogel from The Huffington Post felt that the song was deploying "some tired pop cliches" in the chorus but continued praising "one of the album's more poignant emotional statements, anticipating the heavy burden of expectations the singer is likely to carry while expressing vulnerable appreciation for the acceptance he has received." Houston Chronicle critic Joey Guerra noted that the song was "probably the disc's most straightforward cut, with a bit of a Backstreet Boys vibe. Not bad." On the other hand, Greg Kot of the Chicago Tribune disliked the song and wrote "Lambert throws his hands up in the whiny "Whataya Want from Me," a trifle from the team of Pink and Britney Spears svengali Martin."

== Promotion ==
"Whataya Want from Me" made its live debut on CBS's The Early Show on November 25, 2009. The same day, Lambert also performed the song on Late Show with David Letterman. On December 1, 2009, Lambert appeared on The Ellen DeGeneres Show, also performing "Whataya Want from Me". After much controversy with ABC canceling several of Lambert's performances (and due to accusations of homophobia on the behalf of the network), the network finally decided to let Lambert interview and perform on The View. As a precaution, they pre-taped the interview and performance, to prevent any mishaps or improvisation with Lambert's performance, and to avoid a repeat of his AMA performance. He performed on December 10, 2009. The night before he was on Barbara Walters 10 Most Fascinating People of 2009, also on ABC.

Lambert performed on The Tonight Show with Conan O'Brien on December 14, 2009. On December 16, 2009, he returned to his Fox roots with a live performance of "Whataya Want from Me" on the season finale of So You Think You Can Dance. Lambert performed on The Jay Leno Show on December 21, 2009, followed by another performance on The Oprah Winfrey Show on January 20, 2010. In March 2010, Lambert performed on VH1 Unplugged, where he sang a stripped-down performance of this and other songs off his album. In April 2010, Lambert performed the song on American Idol, having acted as mentor to the contestants of the ninth season during the "Elvis Theme Week". Also during April and May 2010, Lambert promoted the single internationally, performing on Finland's X Factor, in Sweden, in the Netherlands, in Germany, in Switzerland. and on the UK morning show GMTV. and in Switzerland. In further promotion of the song, several songs from For Your Entertainment were performed live on AOL Sessions, including "Whataya Want from Me".

== Commercial performance ==
On November 18, 2009, Lambert announced via his official website that his second single from his debut album For Your Entertainment would be "Whataya Want from Me". On November 20, 2009, the song became available as a legal download in the United States, aligning with the release of the album. "Whataya Want from Me" highlighted a softer, more pop-oriented side of For Your Entertainment, in contrast to the glam rock direction Lambert had originally emphasized. After his performance of the lead single "For Your Entertainment" at the 2009 American Music Awards generated controversy, RCA Records reportedly shifted the promotional focus to "Whataya Want from Me."

"Whataya Want from Me" debuted at number 72 on the US Billboard Hot 100 on the week of January 2, 2010. Following his appearance as a mentor on the ninth season of American Idol, the song reached number ten, becoming Lambert's second top 20 entry after his cover of "Mad World" and first and only top ten single on the Billboard Hot 100. By January 2014, "Whataya Want from Me" had sold approximately 2,006,000 copies within the US.

== Music video ==
The music video for "Whataya Want from Me" was directed by Diane Martel and was shot on December 20, 2009, in Los Angeles. It premiered on January 15, 2010, on VH1. The video depicts Lambert in a tense, unseen relationship, with the camera at times adopting the perspective of his partner. Interspersed throughout are performance scenes of Lambert singing with his band. One sequence shows him navigating through a crowd of paparazzi and fans before entering a car. The visuals open with Lambert turning off a television before beginning the song, a moment that has been interpreted as a nod to the controversy that surrounded his performance at the 2009 American Music Awards.

Critics also noted that the video reflects both Lambert's personal life as a rock star and his relationship with his audience and fans. Throughout the video, he appears to argue with the camera, which is interpreted as representing his unseen partner. In one scene, Lambert walks away in frustration, after which his partner packs their bags and leaves, leaving him alone and distressed. By the end of the video, however, Lambert is shown waking up and warmly greeting the camera, suggesting a reconciliation. In an interview with Pop Couture, Lambert explained that the video was intended to feel more accessible than "For Your Entertainment," resulting in softer textures and less architectural styling, including the use of casual clothing such as cotton fabrics and sweaters.

== Track listings ==
- CD single No. 1
1. "Whataya Want from Me" (Album Version) – 3:47
2. "Whataya Want from Me" (Jason Nevins Electrotek Extended Mix) – 6:22
- CD single No. 2
1. "Whataya Want from Me" (Album Version) – 3:47
2. "Whataya Want from Me" (Fonzerelli's New Romantic Club Mix) – 5:52
- Australian digital download
1. "Whataya Want from Me" – 3:47
2. "Whataya Want from Me" (Fonzerelli's Electro House Club Remix) – 5:52
- Remixes (Part of Remixes album)
1. "Whataya Want from Me" (Brad Walsh's A-Vivir Mix) – 4:31
2. "Whataya Want from Me" (Fonzerelli's Electro House Club Remix) – 5:52
3. "Whataya Want from Me" (Jason Nevins Electrotek Extended Mix) – 6:22

== Credits and personnel ==
Recording

- Recorded at Maratone Studios, Stockholm, Sweden, House of Blues Studios, Los Angeles, California, and Germano Studios, New York City.
- Mixed at MixStar Studios, Virginia Beach, Virginia

Personnel

- Songwriting – Pink, Max Martin, Shellback
- Production – Max Martin, Shellback
- Keyboards – Max Martin
- Drums, guitar and bass – Shellback
- Recording – Max Martin, Shellback, Al Clay, Ann Mincieli
- Recording assistant – Chris Galland, Doug Tyo, Christian Baker
- Mixing – Serban Ghenea
- Mix engineer – John Hanes
- Mixing assistant – Tim Roberts

== Charts ==
=== Weekly charts ===
2010 weekly chart performance for "Whataya Want from Me"
Chart (2010)	Peak position
Australia (ARIA)	4
Austria (Ö3 Austria Top 40)	4
Belgium (Ultratip Bubbling Under Flanders)	2
Belgium (Ultratip Bubbling Under Wallonia)	19
Canada Hot 100 (Billboard)	3
Czech Republic Airplay (ČNS IFPI)	3
Denmark (Tracklisten)	12
European Hot 100 Singles (Billboard)	21
Finland (Suomen virallinen lista)	2
France (SNEP)	7
Germany (GfK)	5
Germany (Airplay Chart)	1
Hungary (Rádiós Top 40)	3
Netherlands (Dutch Top 40)	7
Netherlands (Single Top 100)	23
New Zealand (Recorded Music NZ)	4
Norway (VG-lista)	18
Poland Airplay (ZPAV)	1
Portugal (Billboard)	5
Russia Airplay (TopHit)	12
Scottish Singles Sales (Official Charts)	53
Slovakia Airplay (ČNS IFPI)	25
Spanish Airplay Chart	20
Sweden (Sverigetopplistan)	8
Switzerland (Schweizer Hitparade)	6
UK Singles (Official Charts)	53
US Billboard Hot 100	10
US Adult Contemporary (Billboard)	8
US Adult Pop Airplay (Billboard)	2
US Pop Airplay (Billboard)	12

2017 weekly chart performance for "Whataya Want from Me"
Chart (2017)	Peak position
Belarus Airplay (Eurofest)	190

2026 weekly chart performance for "Whataya Want from Me"
Chart (2026)	Peak position
Kazakhstan Airplay (TopHit)	58

=== Monthly charts ===
2026 monthly chart performance for "Whataya Want from Me"
Chart (2026)	Peak position
Kazakhstan Airplay (TopHit)	86

=== Year-end charts ===
2010 year-end chart performance for "Whataya Want from Me"
Chart (2010)	Position
Australia (ARIA)	40
Austria (Ö3 Austria Top 40)	54
Canada (Canadian Hot 100)	11
Denmark (Tracklisten)	37
Germany (Gfk)	40
Germany (Airplay Chart)	3
Hungary (Rádiós Top 40)	23
Netherlands (Dutch Top 40)	30
New Zealand (Recorded Music NZ)	28
Russia Airplay (TopHit)	28
Sweden (Sverigetopplistan)	71
Switzerland (Schweizer Hitparade)	46
US Billboard Hot 100	45
US Adult Contemporary (Billboard)	14
US Adult Top 40 (Billboard)	10
US Mainstream Top 40 (Billboard)	48

2011 year-end chart performance for "Whataya Want from Me"
Chart (2011)	Position
Russia Airplay (TopHit)	107

== Certifications ==
Region	Certification	Certified units/sales
Australia (ARIA)	Platinum	70,000^{^}
Canada (Music Canada)	2× Platinum	80,000^{*}
Denmark (IFPI Danmark)	Gold	15,000^{^}
Germany (BVMI)	Gold	150,000^{^}
New Zealand (RMNZ)	Platinum	15,000^{*}
Sweden (GLF)	2× Platinum	40,000^{‡}
Switzerland (IFPI Switzerland)	Gold	15,000^{^}
^{*} Sales figures based on certification alone.^{^} Shipments figures based on certification alone.^{‡} Sales+streaming figures based on certification alone.

== Release history ==
"Whataya Want from Me" release history
Region	Date	Format	Ref.
United States	November 20, 2009	Mainstream radio airplay	
Belgium	March 19, 2010	Digital download	
Ireland	April 9, 2010	Digital download	
Spain	April 12, 2010	Digital download	
Finland	April 12, 2010	Digital download	
France	April 12, 2010	Digital download	
Italy	April 12, 2010	Digital download	
Netherlands	April 12, 2010	Digital download	
Sweden	April 12, 2010	Digital download	
Austria	April 12, 2010	Digital download	
Norway	April 12, 2010	Digital download	
Portugal	April 12, 2010	Digital download	
Germany	April 23, 2010	Digital download	
Switzerland	April 30, 2010	Digital download	
Germany	April 30, 2010	CD single	
Australia	May 3, 2010	CD single	
United Kingdom	July 18, 2010	CD single	
