= If I Had You (Adam Lambert song) =

Single by Adam Lambert

from the album For Your Entertainment
- Released: May 11, 2010
- Recorded: September–October 2009
- Studio: Maratone, Stockholm, Sweden; Westlake, Los Angeles, USA
- Genre: Electronic rock; dance-pop
- Length: 3:47 (radio edit)
- Label: RCA; Jive
- Songwriters: Max Martin; Shellback; Savan Kotecha
- Producers: Max Martin; Shellback; Kristian Lundin

Adam Lambert singles chronology
"Whataya Want From Me" (2009)	"If I Had You" (2010)	"Fever" (2010)

Music video
- "If I Had You" on YouTube

"If I Had You" is a song by American recording artist Adam Lambert. It was written by Max Martin, Shellback, and Savan Kotecha for Lambert's debut album, For Your Entertainment (2009), while production was helmed by Martin, Shellback and Kristian Lundin. The song was released as the third and final international single from the album on May 11, 2010. It reached number 30 in the United States and reached the top ten in Australia, Canada, Finland, Hungary and New Zealand.

Directed by Bryan Barber and filmed in May 2010 at Griffith Park, the music video for "If I Had You" features psychedelic, festival-inspired visuals centered on friendship and creative community, using special effects and appearances. Following the release of the single on May 11, 2010, Lambert performed the song on a series of talk-shows, including The Ellen DeGeneres Show on May 19, and The Tonight Show with Jay Leno on May 21. Lambert also performed "If I Had You" on his first concert tour, the 2010 Glam Nation Tour where it was the show's finale.

== Background ==
"If I Had You" was written by Swedish musicians Max Martin and Shellback and American songwriter Savan Kotecha, with production overseen by Martin and Shellback along with Kristian Lundin. A "high octane Europop track," the song promotes unity and connection across differences, emphasizing that love and shared joy matter more than status, wealth, or appearances. Lambert discussed "If I Had You" with Digital Spy: "I think it's got a great message. It does sound a bit cliché but I love promoting love and acceptance and I think the song definitely gets that across. In the pop market we're so sex-saturated and a lot of the big artists are popular because they're "so fierce!" and badass. I love that and get a kick out of that—people like GaGa and Beyoncé especially—−but that's the ground I was trying to cover with For Your Entertainment. The thing about "If I Had You" is that it reflects what I'm really about, which is joy."

== Critical reception ==
"If I Had You" earned generally positive reviews from music critics. Joe Vogel from The Huffington Post noted the song was a "full-display" of its parent album that "operates from a disco/glam aesthetic of escapism and liberation via dance, dress-up, and desire" and added that it "fully accomplish what the singer had in mind for the album: songs that make you want to let loose, dance, work out, have fun." Digital Spy editor Nick Levine found that the "Pink-meets-Britney thump" on "If I Had You" was resulting in a "fun, flashy pop" tune with a chorus "bigger than Lambert's monthly invoice from Mac Cosmetics." Billboard's Glenn Rowley called the song a "glitzy single [...] which finds the glam rocker pining for a love that's just out of reach, taught fans from New York to L.A. to always find the right amount of leather and black color liner before lacing up their boots and strutting down the street." Adam Graham, writing for The Detroit News, thought that "If I Had You" was a "potential single" when reviewing For Your Entertainment.

== Chart performance ==
In the United States, "If I Had You" peaked at number 30 on the US Billboard Hot 100. By August 2011, the song had sold 835,000 downloads domestically. "If I Had You" enjoyed bigger commercial success internationally, reached number-one on the Hungarian Rádiós Top 40 chart, and the top 10 in Australia, Canada, Finland, and New Zealand. In Australia, it was certified 2× platinum by the Australian Recording Industry Association (ARAIA). The song also received gold certifications in New Zealand and Sweden.

== Music video ==
Lambert, wearing a black coat, black boots and gloves while walking in the forest by daylight in the video for "If I Had You"

Filmmaker Bryan Barber directed the music video for " If I Had You." It was filmed on May 13, 2010 at Griffith Park in Los Angeles, California, with outdoor nighttime party and forest scenes shot at night. The video was inspired by Lambert's self-proclaimed "psychedelic" experiences at festivals he had attended, such as Burning Man and Lightning in a Bottle, as well as a broader subculture in California and across the country made up of designers, performance artists, and free-spirited creatives. The visuals take on a psychedelic tone, enhanced by special effects and a diverse cast drawn from Los Angeles performance shows, parties, clubs, and Lambert’s own theater background, resulting in a vibrant mix of creative personalities. With the video centered on friendship and the love shared within one’s chosen circle, Lambert enlisted his real-life friends to participate, including Allison Iraheta and Kesha, aiming to capture a sense of genuine joy and authenticity.

The video premiered June 14, 2010 on VH1. Monica Herrera, writing for Billboard, noted that it "takes the late-night wilderness party motif of Jennifer Lopez's classic "Waiting for Tonight" clip and adds more lasers, guyliner, thrashy dance moves, silver top hats and outrageously spiky shoulder pads." James Montgomery from MTV describes the video as having a "clearing in the forest, one packed with party people — of all races, colors, creeds and proclivities, naturally — who are all in the midst of a totally excellent celebration." Comparing the cisuals to Men Without Hats' music video for "The Safety Dance" (1982), he also stated that the message of the video is that "humanity can, in fact, put their differences aside and just dance."

== Track listing ==
Australian digital EP

1. "If I Had You" (radio mix) – 3:46
2. "If I Had You" (Jason Nevins radio mix) – 3:45
3. "If I Had You" (instrumental version) – 3:43

Australian CD single

1. "If I Had You" – 3:47
2. "If I Had You" (instrumental version) – 3:46

US/AUS digital EP The Remixes

1. "If I Had You" (radio mix) – 3:47
2. "If I Had You" (Jason Nevins extended mix) – 6:44
3. "If I Had You" (Jason Nevins Robotronic extended mix) – 6:17
4. "If I Had You" (Dangerous Muse remix) – 5:51
5. "If I Had You" (Morgan Page extended remix) – 7:53

== Credits and personnel ==
Credits lifted from the liner notes of For Your Entertainment.

- Songwriting – Max Martin, Shellback, Savan Kotecha
- Production – Max Martin, Shellback, Kristian Lundin
- Keyboards – Max Martin, Shellback
- Guitar and bass – Shellback

- Recording – Max Martin, Shellback, Brian Warwick
- Mixing – Serban Ghenea
- Mix engineer – John Hanes
- Mixing assistant – Tim Roberts

== Charts ==
=== Weekly charts ===
Weekly chart performance for "If I Had You "
Chart (2010)	Peak position
Australia (ARIA)	4
Austria (Ö3 Austria Top 40)	50
Belgium (Ultratop 50 Flanders)	50
Canada Hot 100 (Billboard)	8
Czech Republic Airplay (ČNS IFPI)	48
Finland (Suomen virallinen lista)	9
Germany (GfK)	36
Hungary (Rádiós Top 40)	1
New Zealand (Recorded Music NZ)	7
Russia Airplay (TopHit)	35
US Billboard Hot 100	30
US Adult Pop Airplay (Billboard)	14
US Pop Airplay (Billboard)	16

=== Year-end charts ===
2010 year-end chart performance for "If I Had You"
Chart (2010)	Position
Australia (ARIA)	36
Canada (Canadian Hot 100)	34
Hungary (Rádiós Top 40)	50
Russia Airplay (TopHit)	129

2011 year-end chart performance for "If I Had You"
Chart (2011)	Position
Hungary (Rádiós Top 40)	98

== Certifications ==
Region	Certification	Certified units/sales
Australia (ARIA)	2× Platinum	140,000^{^}
New Zealand (RMNZ)	Gold	7,500^{*}
Sweden (GLF)	Gold	20,000^{‡}
^{*} Sales figures based on certification alone.^{^} Shipments figures based on certification alone.^{‡} Sales+streaming figures based on certification alone.

== Release history ==
"If I Had You" release history
Region	Date	Format	Ref.
United States	May 11, 2010	Contemporary hit radio	
Belgium	June 28, 2010	Digital download	
Spain	June 28, 2010	Digital download	
Finland	June 28, 2010	Digital download	
Switzerland	June 28, 2010	Digital download	
France	June 28, 2010	Digital download	
Ireland	June 28, 2010	Digital download	
Italy	June 28, 2010	Digital download	
Luxembourg	June 28, 2010	Digital download	
Netherlands	June 28, 2010	Digital download	
Norway	June 28, 2010	Digital download	
Sweden	June 28, 2010	Digital download	
Canada	June 28, 2010	Digital download	
Portugal	June 28, 2010	Digital download	
Austria	June 28, 2010	Digital download	
Germany	October 29, 2010	Digital download	
Germany	October 29, 2010	CD single	
