= American Music Awards of 2009 =

US television program

37th Annual American Music Awards
- Date: November 22, 2009
- Location: Nokia Theatre L.A. Live, Los Angeles, California
- Country: United States
- Most wins: Taylor Swift (5)
- Most nominations: Taylor Swift (6)
- Website: American Music Awards

Television/radio coverage
- Network: ABC (November 22, 2009); RCTI (November 23, 2009)
- Produced by: Dick Clark Productions

The 37th Annual American Music Awards took place on November 22, 2009 at the Nokia Theatre L.A. Live in Los Angeles, California. The nominees were announced on October 13, 2009. For the first time in history, there was no host for the year's ceremony. Instead, various celebrities introduced the performers similar to the procedure at the Grammy Awards. Taylor Swift won five of six categories she was nominated for. Jay-Z and The Black Eyed Peas both won two awards. Michael Jackson's brother Jermaine Jackson accepted his awards on his behalf.

== Performers ==
Artist(s)	Song(s)
Janet Jackson	"Control" "What Have You Done for Me Lately" "Miss You Much" "If" "Make Me" "Together Again"
Daughtry	"Life After You"
Shakira	"Give It Up to Me"
Keith Urban	"Kiss a Girl"
Kelly Clarkson	"Already Gone"
Jay-Z; Alicia Keys	"Empire State of Mind"
The Black Eyed Peas	"Meet Me Halfway" "Boom Boom Pow"
Rihanna	"Mad House" "Wait Your Turn" "Hard"
Carrie Underwood	"Cowboy Casanova"
Lady Gaga	"Bad Romance" "Speechless"
Mary J. Blige	"I Am"
Jennifer Lopez	"Louboutins"
Whitney Houston	"I Didn’t Know My Own Strength"
Alicia Keys	"Try Sleeping with a Broken Heart"
Eminem; 50 Cent	"Crack a Bottle" "Forever"
Timbaland; Nelly Furtado; SoShy	"Morning After Dark"
Green Day	"21 Guns"
Adam Lambert	"For Your Entertainment"

== Presenters ==
- Paula Abdul — welcomed the audience and presented Favorite Pop/Rock Band/Duo/Group
- Jason Aldean & Kristen Bell — presented Favorite Country Band/Duo/Group
- Pete Wentz — introduced Daughtry
- Julie Bowen & Sofia Vegara — introduced Keith Urban
- Reba McEntire — introduced Kelly Clarkson
- Snoop Dogg & Joe Perry — presented Favorite Pop/Rock Female Artist
- Alex Rodriguez — introduced Jay-Z & Alicia Keys
- Christian Slater— presented Favorite Alternative Rock Music Artist
- Nicole Kidman & Kate Hudson — introduced Black Eyed Peas
- Selena Gomez & Orianthi — presented Favorite Soul/R&B Male Artist
- Zac Brown Band — presented Favorite Country Male Artist
- Demi Lovato & Kris Allen — presented Favorite Soul/R&B Female Artist
- Ne-Yo — introduced Rihanna
- Rascal Flatts — introduced Carrie Underwood
- Drake, Jeremih, & Kid Cudi — introduced Mary J Blige
- Colbie Caillat — presented T-Mobile New Artist of the Year
- Samuel L. Jackson — introduced & presented the International Artist Award to Whitney Houston
- Carrie Ann Inaba & Leona Lewis — presented Favorite Country Female Artist
- Melissa Etheridge — presented Favorite Pop/Rock Male Artist
- Seth Green — introduced Eminem & 50 Cent
- Dominic Monaghan & Morena Baccarin — introducing Green Day
- Keri Hilson & Toni Braxton — presented Favorite Rap/Hip-Hop Male Artist
- Ryan Seacrest — presented Artist of the Year

== Winners and nominees ==
Artist of the Year	New Artist of the Year
Taylor Swift; Eminem; Michael Jackson; Kings of Leon; Lady Gaga	Gloriana; Keri Hilson; Kid Cudi; Lady Gaga
Favorite Pop/Rock Male Artist	Favorite Pop/Rock Female Artist
Michael Jackson; Eminem; T.I.	Taylor Swift; Beyoncé; Lady Gaga
Favorite Pop/Rock Band/Duo/Group	Favorite Pop/Rock Album
The Black Eyed Peas; Kings of Leon; Nickelback	Number Ones – Michael Jackson; The Fame – Lady Gaga; Fearless – Taylor Swift
Favorite Country Male Artist	Favorite Country Female Artist
Keith Urban; Darius Rucker; Jason Aldean	Taylor Swift; Reba McEntire; Carrie Underwood
Favorite Country Band/Duo/Group	Favorite Country Album
Rascal Flatts; Sugarland; Zac Brown Band	Fearless – Taylor Swift; Unstoppable – Rascal Flatts; The Foundation – Zac Brown Band
Favorite Rap/Hip-Hop Artist	Favorite Rap/Hip-Hop Album
Jay-Z; Eminem; T.I.	The Blueprint 3 – Jay-Z; Relapse – Eminem; Paper Trail – T.I.
Favorite Soul/R&B Male Artist	Favorite Soul/R&B Female Artist
Michael Jackson; Jamie Foxx; Maxwell	Beyoncé; Keyshia Cole; Keri Hilson
Favorite Soul/R&B Band, Duo or Group	Favorite Soul/R&B Album
The Black Eyed Peas; Day26; Mary Mary	Number Ones – Michael Jackson; I Am... Sasha Fierce – Beyoncé; The E.N.D. – The Black Eyed Peas
Favorite Soundtrack	Favorite Alternative Rock Artist
Twilight; Hannah Montana: The Movie; Hannah Montana 3	Green Day; Kings of Leon; Shinedown
Favorite Adult Contemporary Artist	Favorite Latin Artist
Taylor Swift; Daughtry; Jason Mraz	Aventura; Luis Fonsi; Wisin & Yandel
Favorite Contemporary Inspirational Artist	International Artist Award
Mary Mary; Jeremy Camp; Brandon Heath	Whitney Houston

== Controversies ==
=== Adam Lambert's performance ===
In response to Adam Lambert's performance of his song "For Your Entertainment" at the end of the ceremony broadcast, the Parents Television Council, a conservative television watchdog group, urged viewers to complain to the FCC if living in an area where the performance was shown before 10 p.m. local time. The PTC complained that the performance contained a simulation of oral sex. Lambert's performance reportedly was broadcast around 11 p.m. Eastern and Pacific time, "outside the FCC's usual 6am-10pm time frame prohibiting the broadcast of indecent material". ABC also received about 1,500 telephoned complaints.

In a report by Lambert, he had been scheduled to also perform on fellow ABC programs Good Morning America, Jimmy Kimmel Live! and Dick Clark's New Year's Rockin' Eve with Ryan Seacrest 2010 (the latter also being produced by Dick Clark Productions), but found out that these bookings were cancelled, possibly in response to the incident. Neither ABC or Dick Clark Productions confirmed his reports or confirmed if he was ever booked at all.

=== Nominations of Michael Jackson ===
After his death in June 2009, Michael Jackson was nominated for five posthumous awards: Artist of the Year, Favorite Pop/Rock Male Artist, Favorite Pop/Rock Album (for Number Ones), Favorite Soul/R&B Male Artist and Favorite Soul/R&B Album (also for Number Ones). This move was subsequently criticized by those who felt that the awards committee was piggybacking on the hype of Jackson's death for ratings and media coverage purposes, and that his nomination was unfair to artists who had brought out newer material to equal success, such as Lady Gaga and Taylor Swift. Not helping matters was that Number Ones was a greatest-hits compilation released in 2003 (six years before that year's awards show), and not only had Jackson not released any new material since "One More Chance" (the sole new recording on that album), but he had already won several American Music Awards for the songs featured on Number Ones. LA Times insisted that "if fans thought it was an injustice that Kanye West had the audacity to interrupt Swift accepting a 'Moon Man' at the MTV Video Music Awards, then they should be ready to riot if she's now losing awards to artists who haven't had a new song in nearly a decade." Jackson went on to win four of his five nominations, only losing out on Artist of the Year, which was won by Swift.
