= The Original High Tour =

2015–16 concert tour by Adam Lambert

- Tour by Adam Lambert
- Promotional poster for tour
- Associated album: The Original High
- Start date: December 31, 2015
- End date: May 6, 2016
- Legs: 4
- No. of shows: 12 in Asia; 6 in Oceania; 23 in North America; 16 in Europe; 57 total

Adam Lambert concert chronology
- Queen + Adam Lambert Tour 2014–2015 (2014-15); The Original High Tour (2016); Queen + Adam Lambert 2016 Summer Festival Tour (2016)

The Original High Tour was the third solo (sixth overall) concert tour by American singer/songwriter Adam Lambert, launched in support of his third studio album, The Original High. The tour began on December 31, 2015 in Singapore and continued throughout China, Japan, South Korea, New Zealand, Australia, United States and Europe concluding in Munich on May 6, 2016.

== Set list ==
1. "Evil in the Night"
2. "For Your Entertainment"
3. "Ghost Town"
4. "Welcome to the Show" (Europe only and some North America)
5. "Runnin'"
6. "Chokehold"
7. "Sleepwalker"
8. "Underground"
9. "Rumors"
10. "Lucy"
11. "After Hours"
12. "Outlaws of Love"
13. "Whataya Want from Me"
14. "Mad World"
15. "There I Said It"
16. "Another Lonely Night"
17. "The Light"
18. "The Original High"
19. "Let's Dance"
20. "Never Close Our Eyes"
21. "Lay Me Down"
22. "Shady"
23. "Fever"
24. "Trespassing"
25. "Another One Bites the Dust"

Encore

26. "If I Had You"

Notes

- In Boston and the European leg of the tour, "If I Had You" was done as the last song of the main set and then a medley of "Trespassing/Another One Bites the Dust" was the encore.

== Tour dates ==
List of concerts, showing date, city, country, venue, opening act, tickets sold, number of available tickets, and gross revenue
| Date | City | Country | Venue | Opening act | Attendance | Revenue |
Leg 1 — Asia
| December 31, 2015 | Singapore | Singapore | The Float at Marina Bay | — | — | — |
| January 3, 2016 | Beijing | China | Beijing Exhibition Center | — | — | — |
| January 5, 2016 | Shanghai | China | Mercedes-Benz Arena | — | — | — |
| January 7, 2016 | Sendai | Japan | Sendai Sun Plaza | — | — | — |
| January 8, 2016 | Tokyo | Japan | Tokyo Dome City Hall | — | — | — |
| January 10, 2016 | Hiroshima | Japan | Blue Live | — | — | — |
| January 12, 2016 | Osaka | Japan | Namba Hatch | — | — | — |
| January 13, 2016 | Nagoya | Japan | Diamond Hall | — | — | — |
| January 15, 2016 | Tokyo | Japan | Ex Theater | — | — | — |
| January 16, 2016 | Tokyo | Japan | Ex Theater | — | — | — |
| January 19, 2016 | Seoul | South Korea | Ax Hall | — | — | — |
Leg 2 — Oceania
| January 22, 2016 | Auckland | New Zealand | Auckland Town Hall | Melanie Martinez | 2,255 / 2,255 | $128,945 |
| January 25, 2016 | Melbourne | Australia | Palais Theatre | Melanie Martinez | 5,469 / 5,469 | $189,938 |
| January 26, 2016 | Melbourne | Australia | Palais Theatre | Melanie Martinez | 5,469 / 5,469 | $189,938 |
| January 28, 2016 | Adelaide | Australia | AEC Theatre | Melanie Martinez | 1,841 / 1,841 | $93,015 |
| January 30, 2016 | Sydney | Australia | Enmore Theatre | Melanie Martinez | 4,850 / 4,850 | $280,064 |
| January 31, 2016 | Sydney | Australia | Enmore Theatre | Melanie Martinez | 4,850 / 4,850 | $280,064 |
Leg 2 — Asia
| February 12, 2016 | Dubai | United Arab Emirates | RedfestDXB | — | — | — |
Leg 3 — North America
| February 23, 2016 | Huntington | United States | Paramount Theater | Alex Newell | 1,360 / 1,573 | $78,038 |
| February 24, 2016 | Boston | United States | House of Blues | Alex Newell | 2,161 / 2,250 | $85,840 |
| February 26, 2016 | Mashantucket | United States | MGM Grand at Foxwoods | Alex Newell | — | — |
| February 27, 2016 | Atlantic City | United States | Circus Maximus Theater | Alex Newell | 1,514 / 1,606 | $107,291 |
| February 28, 2016 | Bethlehem | United States | Sands Event Center | Alex Newell | 1,837 / 1,924 | $133,100 |
| March 1, 2016 | New Brunswick | United States | State Theatre | Alex Newell | — | — |
| March 3, 2016 | New York City | United States | Terminal 5 | Alex Newell | — | — |
| March 5, 2016 | Washington, D.C. | United States | Lincoln Theatre | Alex Newell | — | — |
| March 6, 2016 | Charlotte | United States | The Fillmore | Alex Newell | — | — |
| March 8, 2016 | Atlanta | United States | The Tabernacle | Alex Newell | — | — |
| March 10, 2016 | Nashville | United States | Ryman Auditorium | Alex Newell | 2,123 / 2,123 | $104,380 |
| March 12, 2016 | Hollywood | United States | Hard Rock Live | Alex Newell | — | — |
| March 13, 2016 | Orlando | United States | Universal Music Plaza Stage | Alex Newell | — | — |
| March 14, 2016 | Clearwater | United States | Ruth Eckerd Hall | Alex Newell | — | — |
| March 22, 2016 | Milwaukee | United States | Riverside Theater | Alex Newell | — | — |
| March 23, 2016 | Chicago | United States | The Vic Theatre | Alex Newell | 1,323 / 1,323 | $71,442 |
| March 25, 2016 | Detroit | United States | The Fillmore Detroit | Alex Newell | — | — |
| March 26, 2016 | Mt. Pleasant | United States | Soaring Eagle Casino & Resort | Alex Newell | — | — |
| March 28, 2016 | Wichita | United States | Cotillion Ballroom | Alex Newell | — | — |
| March 30, 2016 | Denver | United States | Paramount Theatre | Alex Newell | — | — |
| April 1, 2016 | Las Vegas | United States | The Foundry | Alex Newell | — | — |
| April 2, 2016 | Los Angeles | United States | Orpheum Theatre | Alex Newell | — | — |
| April 3, 2016 | Los Angeles | United States | Orpheum Theatre | Alex Newell | — | — |
Leg 4 — Europe
| April 13, 2016 | Amsterdam | Netherlands | Heineken Music Hall | The G-Team | — | — |
| April 14, 2016 | London | England | Hammersmith Apollo | Lawson | 5,047 / 5,087 | $208,646 |
| April 16, 2016 | Manchester | England | Manchester Academy | Lawson | — | — |
| April 18, 2016 | Moscow | Russia | Crocus City Hall | — | — | — |
| April 20, 2016 | Tallinn | Estonia | Rock Café | NOËP | — | — |
| April 21, 2016 | Helsinki | Finland | Hartwall Arena | Alex Mattson | — | — |
| April 23, 2016 | Stockholm | Sweden | Fryshuset | The Lola O | — | — |
| April 24, 2016 | Oslo | Norway | Sentrum Scene | Sandra Lyng | — | — |
| April 25, 2016 | Copenhagen | Denmark | Falconer Salen | JOHS | — | — |
| April 27, 2016 | Hamburg | Germany | Große Freiheit | Eveline | — | — |
| April 29, 2016 | Berlin | Germany | Huxleys | Eveline | — | — |
| April 30, 2016 | Warsaw | Poland | Torwar Hall | DJ Bart B | — | — |
| May 2, 2016 | Vienna | Austria | Gasometer | DJ Manshee | — | — |
| May 4, 2016 | Milan | Italy | Alcatraz | — | — | — |
| May 5, 2016 | Zürich | Switzerland | Volkshaus | Alex Price | — | — |
| May 6, 2016 | Munich | Germany | Kesselhaus | Eveline | — | — |
| Total | | | | | 29,780 / 30,301 (98%) | $1,480,699 |

Rescheduled shows

| April 25, 2016 | Copenhagen, Denmark | Vega | This performance was moved to Falconer Salen |

== Tour band ==
- Adam Lambert – lead vocals
- Peter Dyer – keyboards and musical director
- Adam Ross – electric guitars
- Brook Alexander – drums
- Darwin Johnson – bass
- Holly Hyman – dancer, vocals
- Terrance Spencer – dancer, vocals
