= The Original High =

Studio album by Adam Lambert
- Released: June 12, 2015
- Studio: Stockholm, Sweden
- Genres: EDM; pop-house; synth-pop; electropop
- Length: 40:42
- Label: Warner Bros.
- Producers: Max Martin (also exec.); Shellback (also exec.); Axident; Peter Carlsson; Oscar Holter; Ilya; Jarly; Tobias Karlsson; Lulou; Mattman & Robin; OzGo; Ali Payami; Fredrik Samsson; Style of Eye; Svidden

Adam Lambert chronology
Playlist: The Very Best of Adam Lambert (2015)	The Original High (2015)	Spotify Sessions (2016)

Adam Lambert studio album chronology
Trespassing (2012)	The Original High (2015)	Velvet (2020)

Singles from The Original High
- 1. "Ghost Town" Released: April 21, 2015; 2. "Another Lonely Night" Released: October 9, 2015

The Original High is the third studio album by American singer Adam Lambert, released on June 12, 2015, by Warner Bros. Records. The album marked Lambert's first release since leaving previous record label, RCA Records and was executive produced by Max Martin and Shellback, the Swedish duo responsible for co-writing and producing his early-career hits "Whataya Want from Me" and "If I Had You". The record's style has been described as EDM, pop-house, synth-pop, and electropop.

The album received generally favorable reviews, with most critics praising Adam Lambert's confident style, pop growth, and strong personality despite a few criticisms and mixed opinions from some outlets. It reached the top ten on eleven national album charts, opened at number three on the US Billboard 200 with about 42,000 copies sold in its first week, and became Lambert's first ever UK top-10 album by peaking at number eight. In Poland and Russia, the album reached Platinum status.

The Original High was preceded by the release of its lead single, "Ghost Town", on April 21, 2015. The song achieved notable commercial success, emerging as a sleeper hit in several countries where it became Lambert's biggest hit since "Whataya Want from Me" (2009). A second single, "Another Lonely Night," was released on October 9, 2015. From December 31, 2015 to May 6, 2016, Lambert promoted the album with his The Original High Tour.

== Background ==
In July 2013, it was reported that Lambert had left his record label of five years, RCA Records, due to "creative differences"; the label was allegedly pushing him to record an album composed of cover songs from the 1980s. The day after his announcement, Lambert was contacted by Warner Bros. Records. A deal with the label was confirmed by Billboard in January 2015, along with news that his upcoming album would be executively produced by Max Martin and Shellback and was scheduled for release in the summer of 2015. Songwriting for the album began in early 2014, with recording taking place between 2014 and 2015 in the producers' native Sweden.

Lambert first revealed the album title on social media on January 29, 2015, also his birthday. In March 2015, he unveiled additional details regarding the musical direction of the album in an interview with Hunger TV magazine. Describing the style of the album as less "campy" and theatrical than his previous material, Lambert also identified the album's genre as "definitely pop but not bubblegum."

== Critical reception ==
Professional ratings
Aggregate scores
Source	Rating
Metacritic	70/100
Review scores
Source	Rating
AllMusic	4/5 stars
Digital Spy	3/5 stars
The Guardian	3/5 stars
Houston Chronicle	3.5/5 stars
The Irish Times	2/5 stars
New York Daily News	3/5 stars
Newsday	A−
Rolling Stone	3/5 stars

The Original High received positive reviews from music critics. On Metacritic, which assigns a normalized rating out of 100 to reviews from mainstream critics, the album received an average score of 70 based on six reviews, indicating "generally favorable reviews". Stephen Thomas Erlewine from AllMusic gave the album four out of five stars, commenting that "Adam Lambert demonstrates he's in perfect control of his style and sound and knows how to combine both into a sterling modern pop record." Jon Caramanica, music critic of The New York Times was also positive on the album, found the star focused and committed to his style and in the end noted: "While there are a few missteps--Mr. Lambert doesn’t have the R&B sultriness required for “Underground,” and “Rumors” bizarrely cribs the jaunty synth pattern from Lil Wayne’s “Lollipop”--there are almost no extravagances. After years of spectacle, Mr. Lambert may have been saved by modesty."

Lauren Murphy from The Irish Times gave only two stars out of five, commented "this unfortunately titled record is neither original nor uplifting enough to generate a high of any description." Brittany Spanos from the Rolling Stone magazine gave the album three out of five stars, stating that "even when the lyrics verge on ridiculousness [...], he's one of the biggest personalities in pop." Maura Johnson from The Boston Globe wrote that the album is "an appealing snapshot of how Lambert has grown, and how he’s still willing to surprise his listeners and himself." Joey Guerra of the Houston Chronicle was similarly impressed, writing that the album "builds on the brash appeal that made [Lambert] a star." Pip Ellwood of Entertainment Focus called The Original High "the strongest record that Lambert has released to date."

== Commercial performance ==
In the US market, music industry forecasters predicted that the album could enter the top 10 of the US Billboard 200 chart dated 4 July, with about 35,000 units in its first week. It debuted on the Billboard 200 at number three, selling 42,000 copies in its first week, but totalling 47,000 units including streams and tracks.

On the UK Albums Chart, The Original High debuted at number eight, selling 9,817 copies in its first week, giving Lambert his first-ever UK top ten debut. The album also achieved Lambert's highest-ever album position in the Netherlands, debuting at number ten.

== Track listing ==
The Original High standard edition track listing
No.	Title	Writer(s)	Producer(s)	Length
1.	"Ghost Town"	Adam Lambert; Sterling Fox; Max Martin; Ali Payami; Tobias Karlsson	Martin; Payami; Peter Carlsson^{[a]}	3:28
2.	"The Original High"	Lambert; Andreas Schuller; John West; Shellback; Savan Kotecha; Mattias Larsson; Robin Fredriksson; Joe Janiak	Shellback; Mattman & Robin	3:26
3.	"Another Lonely Night"	Lambert; Martin; Fox; Payami	Martin; Payami	3:45
4.	"Underground"	Payami; Janiak	Payami; Ilya^{[a]}	3:37
5.	"There I Said It"	Lambert; Payami; Janiak	Payami; Carlsson^{[a]}	4:21
6.	"Rumors" (featuring Tove Lo)	Lambert; Oscar Görres; Tove Lo; Shellback	Shellback; OzGo	3:45
7.	"Evil in the Night"	Fox; Shellback; Kotecha; Payami; Oscar Holter	Shellback; Holter; Payami	3:56
8.	"Lucy" (featuring Brian May)	Lambert; Payami; Freja Blomberg; Fredrik Samsson	Martin; Payami; Samsson; Carlsson^{[a]}	3:32
9.	"Things I Didn't Say"	Lambert; Ilya Salmanzadeh; Holter; Kotecha; James Alan	Ilya; Holter	3:58
10.	"The Light"	Linus Eklöw; Tiffany Amber; Svidden; Lukas Loules	Lulou; Carlsson^{[a]}	3:35
11.	"Heavy Fire"	Lambert; Anton Rundberg; Hampus Norlander; Joakim Jarl; Elin Blom; Jimmy "Svidden" Koitzsch; Julia Karlsson; Eklöw	Svidden; Jarly; Style of Eye; Carlsson^{[a]}	3:19
Total length:				40:42

Deluxe edition bonus tracks
No.	Title	Writer(s)	Producer(s)	Length
12.	"After Hours"	Lambert; Schuller; West	Axident	2:44
13.	"Shame"	T. Karlsson; Alan	T. Karlsson; Payami^{[b]}	3:26
14.	"These Boys"	Alan; T. Karlsson	T. Karlsson	3:25
Total length:				50:17

Japanese edition bonus tracks
No.	Title	Writer(s)	Producer(s)	Length
15.	"Ghost Town" (Blood Diamonds Remix)	Lambert; Fox; Martin; T. Karlsson; Payami	Martin; Payami; Carlsson^{[a]}; Blood Diamonds^{[c]}	3:49
16.	"Ghost Town" (SeventyEight Remix)	Lambert; Fox; Martin; T. Karlsson; Payami	Martin; Payami; Carlsson^{[a]}; SeventyEight^{[c]}	3:13
17.	"Ghost Town" (Tritonal Remix)	Lambert; Fox; Martin; T. Karlsson; Payami	Martin; Payami; Carlsson^{[a]}; Tritional^{[c]}	5:10
Total length:				62:29

Notes

- ^{^[a]} signifies a vocal producer
- ^{^[b]} signifies an additional producer
- ^{^[c]} signifies a remixer

== Personnel ==
Credits adapted from the liner notes of the deluxe version.

- Adam Lambert – vocals (all tracks)
- Shellback – keyboards (2, 6, 7), programming (2, 6, 7), guitar (2, 7), bass (7), backing vocals (2, 6, 7), production (2, 6, 7) exec. production (all tracks)
- Mattman & Robin – keyboards (2), programming (2), guitar (2), bass (2), percussion (2), production (2)
- Ali Payami – programming (1, 3, 4, 5, 7, 8, 13), bass (1, 3, 4, 5, 8), keyboards (1, 3, 4, 5, 7, 8), percussion (1, 3, 4, 5, 8, 13), production (1, 3, 4, 5, 7, 8) additional production (13)
- Tobias Karlsson – guitars (1, 13, 14), keyboards (13, 14), bass (13, 14), programming (13, 14), production (13, 14), engineering (13, 14), vocal recording
- Tove Lo – vocals (6)
- Oscar Holter – keyboards (7, 9), bass (9), guitar (9), programming (7, 9), backing vocals (9), production (7, 9), vocal production (9)
- Ilya – programming (9), bass (9), keys (9), guitars (9), backing vocals (9), production (9), vocal production (4, 9)
- Thrice Noble – programming (13), additional keys and guitar (13)
- Savan Kotecha – backing vocals (9)
- Lulou – guitars, keyboards, bass, programming, percussion (10), production (10)
- Svideen – keyboards, bass, programming, percussion (11), production (11)
- Jarly – keyboards, bass, programming, percussion (11), production (11), vocal editing (11)
- Style of Eye – keyboards, bass, programming, percussion (11), production (11)
- Andreas Schuller – percussion, synth (12)
- John West – guitar (12)
- Brian May – guitar (8)
- OzGo – keyboards (6), guitar (6), programming (6), production (6)
- Axident – guitar, percussion (2), production (12), engineering (12)
- Max Martin – backing vocals (4), production (1, 3, 8) exec. production (all tracks)
- Sterling Fox – backing vocals (1, 3)
- Fredrik Samsson – production (8)
- Cory Bice – engineering (1, 9), assistant engineering (3, 5, 8)
- Michael Ilbert – additional engineering (1)
- Peter Carlsson – engineering (9), vocal production (5, 8, 10, 11), vocal recording (2), vocal editing (3, 7)
- Spyke Lee – assistant engineering (2, 6, 7)
- Sam Holland – engineering (3, 5, 8, 10)
- Jeremy Lertola – assistant engineering (3)
- Eric Weaver – engineering (13, 14)
- Serban Ghenea – mixing (1–9)
- John Hanes – assistant mix engineering (1–9)
- Michael Ilbert – mixing (10–14)
- Tim Roberts – assistant mix engineering (2, 6, 7)
- Nanni Johansson – assistant mix engineering (10–14)
- Tom Coyne – mastering (all tracks)
- Randy Merrill – assistant mastering engineering (all tracks)

== Charts ==
=== Weekly charts ===
Chart (2015)	Peak position
Australian Albums (ARIA)	4
Austrian Albums (Ö3 Austria)	43
Czech Albums (ČNS IFPI)	8
Belgian Albums (Ultratop Flanders)	61
Belgian Albums (Ultratop Wallonia)	110
Canadian Albums (Billboard)	3
Dutch Albums (Album Top 100)	10
Finnish Albums (Suomen virallinen lista)	4
German Albums (Offizielle Top 100)	20
Hungarian Albums (MAHASZ)	4
Irish Albums (IRMA)	41
Italian Albums (FIMI)	51
Japanese Albums (Oricon)	47
South Korean Albums (Circle)	39
South Korean International Albums (Circle)	10
New Zealand Albums (RMNZ)	6
Polish Albums (ZPAV)	3
Scottish Albums (Official Charts)	10
South African Albums (RISA)	13
Swedish Albums (Sverigetopplistan)	51
Swiss Albums (Schweizer Hitparade)	23
UK Albums (Official Charts)	8
US Billboard 200	3
US Digital Albums (Billboard)	2
US Indie Store Album Sales (Billboard)	23

=== Year-end charts ===
Chart (2015)	Position
Australian Albums (ARIA)	87
Hungarian Albums (MAHASZ)	85

== Certifications ==
Region	Certification	Certified units/sales
Canada	—	4,800
United Kingdom	—	9,817
United States	—	42,000
Poland (ZPAV)	Platinum	20,000^{‡}
Russia (NFPF)	Platinum	10,000^{*}
^{*} Sales figures based on certification alone.^{‡} Sales+streaming figures based on certification alone.

== Release history ==
The Original High release history
Region	Date	Format	Label	Edition(s)	Ref(s)
Australia	June 12, 2015	CD; digital download; LP	Warner Bros.	Standard; deluxe	
United States	June 16, 2015	CD; digital download; LP	Warner Bros.	Standard; deluxe	
