= Ghost Town (Adam Lambert song) =

2015 single by Adam Lambert

Single by Adam Lambert

from the album The Original High
- Released: April 21, 2015
- Recorded: 2014–15
- Studio: Stockholm, Sweden
- Genre: Eurodance; house
- Length: 3:28
- Label: Warner Bros.
- Songwriters: Sterling Fox; Max Martin; Ali Payami; Tobias Erik Karlsson; Adam Lambert
- Producers: Max Martin; Peter Carlsson; Ali Payami

Adam Lambert singles chronology
"Trespassing" (2012)	"Ghost Town" (2015)	"Another Lonely Night" (2015)

Music video
- "Ghost Town" on YouTube

"Ghost Town" is a song recorded by American singer Adam Lambert for his third studio album, The Original High (2015). It was released as the album's lead single on April 21, 2015. The single garnered considerable commercial and critical success, becoming somewhat of a sleeper hit in select countries and receiving a substantial amount of radio play in the US.

== Background ==
In July 2013, it was reported that Lambert had left his record label of four years, RCA Records, due to "creative differences" and the label allegedly pushing him to record an album composed of cover songs from the 1980s. The day after his announcement, Lambert was contacted by Warner Bros. Records. A deal with the label was confirmed by Billboard in January 2015, along with news that his upcoming album would be executive produced by Max Martin and Shellback and was scheduled for release in the summer of 2015. Songwriting for the album began in early 2014, with recording taking place between 2014 and 2015 in the producers' native Sweden.

Lambert first revealed the album title on social media on January 29, 2015, also his birthday. In March 2015, he unveiled additional details regarding the musical direction of the album in an interview with Hunger TV magazine. Describing the style of the album as less "campy" and theatrical than his previous material, Lambert also identified the album's genre as "definitely pop but not bubblegum." Lambert revealed the single cover art for "Ghost Town" on April 16, 2015.

== Composition ==
Jason Lipshutz, a writer from Billboard, noted that "Ghost Town" starts with "a Wild West whistle, which laces together guitar balladry and EDM drops". Lewis Corner of Digital Spy described as the song has "a massive earworm hook – which is in the form of an addictive whistle line here – but its overall tone is marginally darker than their previous shiny anthems." He also noted that the song's verses are "dusty and spacious" with "an acoustic guitar line" and the chorus drops into "a deep house bassline and stomping club beats." Music critics noted the similarity between "Ghost Town" and Madonna's similarly titled song, "Ghosttown," because of the similarity between the titles and proximity of the songs' releases. Lambert was surprised Madonna also had a song with the same title, but he thought "Hers is like a post-apocalyptic love song, mid-tempo, and mine's like an existential dance goth rave thing. So they're two different songs – they just share a title."

== Critical reception ==
Rob Copsey from Official Charts Company called "Ghost Town" "a triumphant return...the kind of song that forces you to sit up and take notice." Lipshutz from Billboard commented that "the track could use a bigger energy boost, although the dark house beats suit Lambert well". Jon Caramanica of The New York Times called it "perhaps his best single to date... [Lambert] becomes a house diva, singing with precision and ambition but in service of the song." Lewis Corner of Digital Spy commented "it's a mood perfect for Adam's balance of glam rock image, soulful vocal and today's house music-dominated landscape."

== Commercial performance ==
"Ghost Town" entered the UK Singles Chart at number 82. The following week, the song climbed to number 71 with 5,637 on sales.

"Ghost Town" jumped from number 16 to number 2 on the Australian ARIA Singles Chart for the week August 10, 2015 following his performance on The Voice Australia.

''Ghost Town'' topped the chart in Poland and was certified triple platinum. It was also certified triple platinum in the Netherlands, double platinum in Sweden and Australia and platinum in Denmark. ''Ghost Town'' was certified Gold in US and Germany.

Since then, the single has sold more than 1.2 million copies worldwide.

== Music video ==
The accompanying music video for "Ghost Town" was directed by Hype Williams and premiered on April 29, 2015. The video features Lambert dancing on a white background with flashes of all types of dancers dancing to the rhythm. Scenes also include old photos of a ghost town.

== Live performances ==
On May 1, 2015, Lambert performed "Ghost Town" live for the first time, donning an all-white ensemble, on Ellen. According to Billboard magazine, the performance was "haunting" and a "perfect complement to the official video" for the song.

On June 5, 2015, Lambert performed "Ghost Town" on the Dutch television show RTL Late Night, and on June 6, 2015, in Finland at the "Live Aid Uusi Lastensairaala" concert.

Additional live performances include a performance of June 15, 2015 on The Tonight Show Starring Jimmy Fallon and a performance on Live with Kelly and Michael, which was taped on June 16, 2015 and aired on the morning of June 19, 2015.

He also performed the song on June 19, 2015 as part of Good Morning America's Summer Concert Series in Central Park, and on August 2, 2015 on the Australian version of The Voice.

The song was performed during Lambert's tour of South America with Queen in 2015 and was included in the setlist of The Original High Tour in 2016.

== Track listing ==
All tracks are written by Adam Lambert, Sterling Fox, Max Martin, Tobias Erik Karlsson, Ali Payami.

CD single
No.	Title	Length
1.	"Ghost Town"	3:39
2.	"Ghost Town" (Dave Winnel Remix)	4:43

Remixes EP
No.	Title	Length
1.	"Ghost Town" (Tritonal Remix)	5:10
2.	"Ghost Town" (Dave Winnel Remix)	4:42
3.	"Ghost Town" (Blood Diamonds Remix)	3:48
4.	"Ghost Town" (Steven Redant Remix)	7:02
5.	"Ghost Town" (Kream Remix)	4:05

== Charts ==
=== Weekly charts ===
Chart (2015–2016)	Peak position
Australia (ARIA)	2
Austria (Ö3 Austria Top 40)	10
Belgium (Ultratip Bubbling Under Flanders)	30
Belgium (Ultratip Bubbling Under Wallonia)	17
Canada Hot 100 (Billboard)	57
CIS Airplay (TopHit)	2
Czech Republic Airplay (ČNS IFPI)	8
Czech Republic Singles Digital (ČNS IFPI)	19
Denmark (Tracklisten)	30
Finland (Suomen virallinen lista)	13
Germany (GfK)	11
Hungary (Rádiós Top 40)	10
Hungary (Single Top 40)	22
Hungary (Stream Top 40)	29
Ireland (IRMA)	68
Mexico Anglo (Monitor Latino)	7
Netherlands (Dutch Top 40)	6
Netherlands (Single Top 100)	8
New Zealand (Recorded Music NZ)	27
Poland Airplay (ZPAV)	1
Poland Dance (ZPAV)	1
Russia (Tophit)	3
Scottish Singles Sales (Official Charts)	38
Slovakia Airplay (ČNS IFPI)	5
Slovakia Singles Digital (ČNS IFPI)	25
Slovenia (SloTop50)	19
South Africa Airplay (EMA)	2
Sweden (Sverigetopplistan)	25
Switzerland (Schweizer Hitparade)	50
Ukraine (Tophit)	16
UK Singles (Official Charts)	71
US Billboard Hot 100	64
US Adult Pop Airplay (Billboard)	17
US Pop Airplay (Billboard)	20

2025 Weekly chart performance for "Ghost Town"
Chart (2025)	Peak position
Moldova Airplay (TopHit)	38

=== Monthly charts ===
2025 monthly chart performance for "Ghost Town"
Chart (2025)	Peak position
Moldova Airplay (TopHit)	78

=== Year-end charts ===
Chart (2015)	Position
Australia (ARIA)	32
Austria (Ö3 Austria Top 40)	56
CIS Airplay (Tophit)	21
Germany (Official German Charts)	44
Hungary (Rádiós Top 40)	54
Netherlands (Dutch Top 40)	15
Netherlands (Single Top 100)	28
Poland (ZPAV)	13
Russia Airplay (Tophit)	21
Sweden (Sverigetopplistan)	97
Ukraine Airplay (Tophit)	69
US Adult Top 40 (Billboard)	50
Chart (2016)	Position
Argentina Airplay (Monitor Latino)	88
Slovenia Airplay (SloTop50)	36

== Certifications ==
Region	Certification	Certified units/sales
Australia (ARIA)	2× Platinum	140,000^{^}
Austria (IFPI Austria)	Gold	15,000^{‡}
Denmark (IFPI Danmark)	Platinum	90,000^{‡}
Germany (BVMI)	Platinum	400,000^{‡}
Netherlands (NVPI)	3× Platinum	90,000^{‡}
New Zealand (RMNZ)	Gold	7,500^{*}
Poland (ZPAV)	3× Platinum	60,000^{‡}
Sweden (GLF)	2× Platinum	80,000^{‡}
United States (RIAA)	Gold	500,000^{‡}
^{*} Sales figures based on certification alone.^{^} Shipments figures based on certification alone.^{‡} Sales+streaming figures based on certification alone.
