= Better Than I Know Myself =

Single by Adam Lambert

from the album Trespassing
- Released: December 20, 2011
- Genre: Synthpop
- Length: 3:36
- Label: RCA
- Songwriters: Lukasz Gottwald; Joshua Coleman; Claude Kelly; Henry Walter
- Producers: Dr. Luke; Cirkut; Ammo

Adam Lambert singles chronology
"Sleepwalker" (2011)	"Better Than I Know Myself" (2011)	"Never Close Our Eyes" (2012)

Music video
- "Better Than I Know Myself" on YouTube

"Better Than I Know Myself" is a song by American recording artist Adam Lambert from his second studio album, Trespassing. The song was released as the album's lead single on December 20, 2011. It was released to US mainstream radio on January 24, 2012. The song was written and produced by Dr. Luke, Cirkut, and Ammo, and co-written by Claude Kelly.

== Background and composition ==
On December 15, 2011 RCA Records announced that "Better Than I Know Myself" would serve as the lead single from Adam Lambert's upcoming second studio album, Trespassing due for March 2012. The following day the song premiered in full online. The song was released via iTunes on December 20, 2011, in the United States. On January 23, 2012, the song was released to adult contemporary radio, and to Top 40/Mainstream radio the following day.

"Better Than I Know Myself" is a synthpop ballad. The instrumentation consists of a thumping bass beat, a keyboard, and "retro synth washes" as described by Bill Lamb of About.com. Lyrically, the song revolves around romantic regret. Adam Lambert sings about "a lover who knows you inside and out".

== Critical reception ==
"Better Than I Know Myself" received mostly positive reviews from music critics. Contessa Gayles of AOL Music Blog wrote, "The 'American Idol' star's new mid-tempo track is a Dr. Luke and Claude Kelly production about a lover who knows you inside and out" and called the song an "epic piano ballad". She also complimented Adam Lambert's "gifted vocals". Bill Lamb of About.com said, "Adam Lambert's voice is a unique and powerful instrument, but when the song and production are dull, even the best voice can't completely turn things around."

Liz Barker of MTV called the song "one of Adam's biggest, boldest and most beautiful tracks to date". Billboard's Jason Lipshutz compared the song's "winning pop-rock formula" to Lambert's 2009 breakthrough single "Whataya Want from Me" and wrote: "While "Better Than I Know Myself" is not as immediately overpowering, repeated listenings amplify the untamed vulnerability that has become Lambert's defining asset. [...] Like any talented pop artist, Lambert understands subtle reflection as well as epic bombast." According to Rolling Stone reviewer Jody Rosen, the song showcases "Lambert's superhuman vocal range", while referring to the song as "formulaic pop".

== Chart performance ==
In the United States, the song debuted at number 76 on the Billboard Hot 100 on the chart dated January 7, 2012, before its official radio issue date. It was only successful in select countries such as Finland and Japan, in both of which they charted in the top ten. It failed to reach the Top 40 in the United States and is Lambert's lowest charting single to date.

== Music video ==
The music video was directed by Ray Kay and premiered on February 3, 2012, on Lambert's official Vevo page. The video's concept deals with duality and the conflict between the darker and lighter sides of Lambert which is also explored on the album. The video begins with the two characters in a room separated by a glass window. In the course of the video the two get into an argument resulting in the dark side polluting the light side's oxygen supply. It ends with the dark side rescuing his better half by breaking through the glass and connecting with him, making the both of them form into one person.

== Live performances ==
Adam Lambert performed "Better Than I Know Myself" for the first time on January 17, 2012, on The Tonight Show with Jay Leno. He appeared with minimal make-up while wearing a black suit and white shirt with no tie. He then performed the song on January 19, 2012, on The Ellen DeGeneres Show.

== Track listing ==
- Digital download
1. "Better Than I Know Myself" – 3:36
- CD single
1. "Better Than I Know Myself" – 3:35
2. "Better Than I Know Myself" (Alex Ghenea Remix) – 3:23
- "Better Than I Know Myself" - The Remixes EP
1. "Better Than I Know Myself" (Alex Ghenea Remix) – 3:23
2. "Better Than I Know Myself" (Dave Audé Dubstep Remix) - 4:00
3. "Better Than I Know Myself" (Robert Marvin & Shearer Remix) - 3:35

== Charts ==
Chart (2011–12)	Peak position
Australia (ARIA)	83
Belgium (Ultratip Bubbling Under Flanders)	15
Canada (Canadian Hot 100)	56
Finland (Suomen virallinen lista)	6
Germany (GfK)	88
New Zealand (Recorded Music NZ)	40
Japan (Japan Hot 100)	9
Japan Hot Overseas (Billboard)	1
South Korea International Singles (Gaon)	27
US Billboard Hot 100	76
US Adult Pop Songs (Billboard)	18

== Radio and release history ==
Country	Date	Format	Label
Worldwide	December 20, 2011	Digital download	19 Recordings; RCA Records
United States	January 23, 2012	Adult contemporary radio airplay	19 Recordings; RCA Records
United States	January 24, 2012	Mainstream radio airplay	19 Recordings; RCA Records
Germany	March 9, 2012	Digital download	19 Recordings; RCA Records
Germany	March 16, 2012	CD single	19 Recordings; RCA Records
