= Trespassing (album) =

- Standard version artwork

Studio album by Adam Lambert
- Released: May 15, 2012
- Recorded: December 2010 – March 2012
- Genres: Pop; electropop; dance-pop
- Length: 42:34
- Labels: RCA; 19
- Producers: Josh Abraham; Ammo; Jason Bonilla; busbee; Cirkut; Josh Crosby; Adam Lambert (exec.); Robert Marvin; Lester Mendez; Dr. Luke; Oligee; The Smeezingtons; U-Tern; Rune Westberg; Fred Williams; Pharrell Williams

Adam Lambert chronology
Glam Nation Live (2011)	Trespassing (2012)	Trespassing EP (2012)

Adam Lambert studio album chronology
For Your Entertainment (2009)	Trespassing (2012)	The Original High (2015)

Singles from Trespassing
- 1. "Better Than I Know Myself" Released: December 20, 2011; 2. "Never Close Our Eyes" Released: April 17, 2012; 3. "Trespassing" Released: October 8, 2012

Trespassing is the second studio album by American singer Adam Lambert, released on May 15, 2012, by RCA Records Originally scheduled for March 20, 2012, the album was pushed back for two months in order to add more songs and collaborations. In late March, alongside the reveal of snippets of four album tracks, Lambert announced on Twitter that the album would be released on May 15, 2012. Lambert is the executive producer on Trespassing, as well as a principal writer.

Trespassing debuted at number one on the Billboard 200, selling 77,000 copies in its first week, making Lambert the first openly gay artist to do so in history. The album also topped the Canadian and Hungarian charts. It performed very well internationally, charting in all major territories and was met with positive reception from most music critics, praising Lambert's musicianship and the "catchiness" of the record. The album was also voted the best album of 2012 in the Rolling Stone Reader's Poll.

The album spawned three singles: "Better Than I Know Myself", "Never Close Our Eyes", and "Trespassing", which achieved limited success on the charts in the United States but were moderately successful in Europe and New Zealand. Trespassing was promoted in 2012 through a string of concerts and television appearances in North America, Europe, Asia and Australia. In 2013, Lambert embarked on a mini concert tour dubbed "We Are Glamily", which visited parts of Asia and Europe which was successful.

== Background ==
After completing his Glam Nation Tour in late 2010, Lambert took his time working on his second album, and changed direction in both sound and creative process. Whereas his first album For Your Entertainment featured a glam rock sound, Lambert turned to funk and pop music to create a more dance-oriented record and began collaborating with a new team of producers, including Dr. Luke, Pharrell Williams and Bruno Mars. He also assumed creative control as executive producer of Trespassing and co-wrote most of the songs. Conceptually, the album represents the lighter and darker sides of Lambert and reveals more of his personal side. The album is split between two sections: the first "lighter side" features more uptempo, party-themed tracks, while the second "darker side" includes ballads and other songs that explore more somber themes of anxiety, love and heartache. Several songs were inspired by Lambert's relationship with Sauli Koskinen. These include "Broken English" which "reflects the challenges and rewards of this relationship", "Naked Love", and "Shady" which is about the night they first met. The song "Outlaws of Love" which he co-wrote with BC Jean is considered to be the most important and political song of the album as it is about legalizing gay marriage. Lambert first introduced the song back in July 2011 at the Sainte Agathe en Feux Festival in Quebec, Canada. Originally slated for a March 2012 release, the official release date was pushed back due to "linguistics, more songs" and such. Around fifty tracks were recorded for Trespassing, but seventeen total tracks were officially released. At one point, Underneath was considered for the title. Lambert describes Trespassing as a very "funky" sounding record, and says that he feels much more grounded with this album.

In October 2012, "Hold On", a song originally recorded for Trespassing, was leaked online. Lambert recorded the track with Printz Board and Nikka Costa, later tweeting that it was indeed a leaked outtake.

== Promotion ==
The album and its singles were promoted through a string of concerts and television appearances throughout 2012. On January 17, Lambert performed the album's lead single "Better Than I Know Myself" for the first time on The Tonight Show with Jay Leno. To tie into the new era of his career, he sported a simple black suit with no tie and wore minimal to no make-up and eye liner. However, he still had his signature black painted finger nails. Two days later, he performed the song again on The Ellen DeGeneres Show.

On January 29, for his 30th birthday, Lambert performed at Q-Snowcase in Zell Am See, Austria. In a five-song acoustic set, Lambert and his band performed three songs from the new album—including a debut unplugged version of the title track "Trespassing", described as "fierce and funky" in this rendition. They also played some acoustic sets in Germany and Stockholm to promote the album.

Lambert and his partner Sauli Koskinen appeared at the 2012 NewNowNext Awards where he performed the album's title track. The performance had Lambert with his new band lineup backing him, which included his lead guitarist, drummer, bass player, keyboard player and two female backup singers who were dressed in choir robes. He also appeared on Jimmy Kimmel Live! where he performed the second single "Never Close Our Eyes" along with other songs from the album such as "Naked Love", "Cuckoo" and "Broken English". Lambert performed a series of promo concerts in various night clubs and festivals throughout North America, Europe and Japan during the summer of 2012. He visited Nashville in March and performed at Six Flags San Antonio as well. In mid-August he appeared on a Japanese talk show and performed the album's title track again. The performance was simple but had Lambert sporting his new dyed blonde hair and arm tattoo for the first time. After leaving Japan, he went to Australia for a week, performing several concerts as well as giving TV and radio interviews. On September 1, he performed at the Matinee Labor Day celebration held at Circus Disco in West Hollywood, California. Lambert performed in Washington, D.C.'s 9:30 club's fundraising benefit concert on behalf of marriage equality on September 25. He also performed in China. Lambert was later included in the lineup at the Texas Tango concert and Live in the Vineyard in October. Lambert finally treated South African fans with two tour dates in November. This was his first time performing in South Africa. Lambert performed his first concert in Vietnam on January 4, 2013. He also made a performance on New Year's Eve while on vacation in Bali. Lambert further promoted Trespassing by embarking on a mini concert tour dubbed "We Are Glamily", which included several concerts in Asian countries during February and March 2013. Lambert traveled to perform at the Miami Pride festival on April 14, and was interviewed by Kyle Collins before performing. He later performed at Pittsburg Pride in the Street festival on June 15, and the San Diego County Fair on July 2, 2013. On June 29, Lambert performed at Universal Orlando as part of their summer concert series. On July 19, 2013, Lambert performed at the California Mid-State Fair at Paso Robles with special guest Allison Iraheta and her band Halo Circus. Adam returned to Miami again on November 30, 2013, this time at the Fontainbleau. On December 29, Adam perform at Hard Rock Biloxi and at Winstar World Casino in Thackerville, Oklahoma on December 31, 2013.

=== We Are Glamily Tour ===
The We Are Glamily Tour began in February 2013 in Seoul, South Korea, before visiting Japan including three nights at the Shibuya Public Hall in Tokyo, then to China, Singapore, Indonesia, and to Belarus, Ukraine, Russia and Finland across the following month.

== Singles ==
The lead single from Trespassing is "Better Than I Know Myself", which was released digitally on December 20, 2011. The song was written by Lukasz Gottwald, Joshua Coleman, Claude Kelly, and Henry Walter. It received mostly positive reviews from music critics. The song charted at number 76 on the Billboard Hot 100, the lowest chart position of Lambert's career to date.

The second single, "Never Close Our Eyes" was announced via Lambert's Twitter account on April 11, 2012, and included a photo of the artwork. It was co-written by American singer-songwriter Bruno Mars, and was met with positive reviews. The song premiered the following day through his SoundCloud profile. The song was released on April 17, 2012. It was sent to mainstream radio in the United States on May 29, 2012. Like previous single, "Never Close Our Eyes" made little to no significant impact on the Billboard Hot 100, however it became a top 10 dance club hit, his second single to do so. The single also became Lambert's first top 20 hit in the United Kingdom, debuting and peaking at position number 17 on the UK Singles Chart.

On September 5, 2012, after much speculation and a leak of the news by a Dallas radio station, Lambert confirmed on Twitter that "Trespassing", written by himself and Pharrell Williams, would be the next single. The announcement was accompanied by a contest in which Lambert asked fans to create and submit videos of themselves performing the song. A lyric video for "Trespassing", featuring the album's signature black and yellow colors, was uploaded on the singer's Vevo account on October 4, 2012. The song was officially released to radio on October 8. An eight-track Trespassing EP was released digitally on October 16, with a hard copy/digital download combination available from Lambert's official site. The EP included remixes of "Trespassing" by Pharrell Williams, Benny Benassi, Zak Waters, and vAnity mAchine; "Never Close Our Eyes" by R3hab, Mig & Mike Rizzo; "Better Than I Know Myself" by Robert Marvin and Shearer; and "Pop That Lock" by Johnny Labs. "Trespassing" peaked at number 38 on the Hungarian Airplay Chart. As of mid-2014, no official music video of the single has surfaced yet.

== Critical reception ==
Professional ratings
Aggregate scores
Source	Rating
Metacritic	66/100
Review scores
Source	Rating
AllMusic	4/5 stars
Billboard	4.5/5 stars
Daily News	4/5 stars
Entertainment Weekly	B−
The Guardian	3/5 stars
Newsday	B+
The Observer	3/5 stars
PopMatters	5/10
Rolling Stone	4/5 stars
Slant Magazine	3.5/5 stars

Trespassing received generally favorable reviews from music critics upon its release. At Metacritic, which assigns a normalized rating out of 100 to reviews from mainstream critics, the album received an average score of 66 based on 10 reviews, which indicates "generally favorable reviews". Rolling Stone gave Trespassing a positive review, stating that it was "the great pop album everybody was hoping Adam Lambert would make." AllMusic cited Lambert's confidence and catchy hooks in songs like "Kickin' In", "Shady" and "Cuckoo" and stated that "even if these songs never grace the charts, they sound like inevitable hits and prove that Lambert is a genuine pop star who has now left American Idol far behind." Writing for USA Today, Brian Mansfield wrote: "More cohesive, more personal than 2010's For Your Entertainment, Trespassing find Adam drawn to the beats and sounds of electronic dance music. As he heads there, he takes his fans with them, introducing them to new scenes, expanding their musical palettes." Shirley Halperlin from The Hollywood Reporter found that the album, "in one start-to-finish sitting, takes the listener full circle much like a relationship would or a night out or a block of time known as life."

Entertainment Weekly was slightly more critical and gave the album a B−, finding its second half to be "so laughably over the top" and going on to say that "by the end, our hero is wailing about fallen Towers of Babel and ripping away his flesh and bone to a red river of screams." Slant Magazine appreciated the record sounding "current" and Lambert's "newfound control and knowing when it's actually in service to a song to unleash the full power of his voice", yet criticized the tracks "Better Than I Know Myself" and "Never Close Our Eyes" as "the same kinds of soulless, studio-slick flourishes that have characterized [producer Dr. Luke's] work with Katy Perry and Ke$ha". Billboard noted the album's change of sound and was positive of Lambert's "vocal charisma and ridiculous power" and went on to say that "the lesson with Adam Lambert is the same now as it was when he was burning up "Idol" three years ago—underestimate him at your own risk". PopMatters editor Josh Langhoff wrote: "Like his first album For Your Entertainment, Trespassing disappoints because it's Lambert playing on pop's terms and sometimes narrowing the terms unnecessarily." Associated Press editor Wayne Parry noted that "Lambert narrows" his focus on Trespassing "to dance, pop tracks." The album was voted the best album of 2012 in the Rolling Stone Reader's Poll.

== Commercial performance ==
The album debuted at number one on the Billboard 200 chart, with 77,000 copies sold for its opening week. This is said to be the first number one album by an openly gay male artist on the chart. The album has sold 197,000 copies in the US as of May 2015.

== Track listing ==
No.	Title	Writer(s)	Producer(s)	Length
1.	"Trespassing"	Adam Lambert; Pharrell Williams	P. Williams	3:29
2.	"Cuckoo"	Lambert; Oliver Goldstein; Bonnie McKee; Josh Abraham; Anne Preven	Abraham; Oligee; U-Tern (add.)	3:02
3.	"Shady" (featuring Nile Rodgers and Sam Sparro)	Lambert; Lester Mendez; Sparro	Mendez	3:00
4.	"Never Close Our Eyes"	Bruno Mars; Phillip Lawrence; Ari Levine; Luke Gottwald; Henry Walter	Dr. Luke; Cirkut; The Smeezingtons	4:08
5.	"Kickin' In"	Lambert; P. Williams	P. Williams	3:16
6.	"Naked Love"	Benjamin Levin; Ammar Malik; Dan Omelio; Goldstein; Abraham	Abraham; Oligee	3:22
7.	"Pop That Lock"	Lambert; Josh Crosby; Lesley Roy; Robert Marvin; Nate Campany	Marvin; Crosby	3:14
8.	"Better Than I Know Myself"	Gottwald; Joshua Coleman; Claude Kelly; Walter	Dr. Luke; Cirkut; Ammo	3:36
9.	"Broken English"	Lambert; Mendez; Sparro	Mendez	3:37
10.	"Underneath"	Lambert; Crosby; Catt Gravitt; Tom Shapiro	Crosby; Marvin	4:08
11.	"Chokehold"	Lambert; Goldstein; McKee; Abraham	Abraham; Oligee	3:51
12.	"Outlaws of Love"	Lambert; Rune Westberg; BC Jean	Westberg	3:51
Total length:				42:34

Deluxe edition bonus tracks
No.	Title	Writer(s)	Producer(s)	Length
13.	"Runnin'"	Lambert; David Marshall; Fred Williams; Gravitt; Marvin	Marvin; F. Williams (add.)	3:48
14.	"Take Back"	Lambert; busbee	busbee; J Bonilla	3:12
15.	"Nirvana"	Lambert; Abraham; Goldstein; Stephen Wrabel	Abraham; Oligee	4:22
Total length:				53:56

Japanese and Asian tour edition bonus track
No.	Title	Writer(s)	Producer(s)	Length
16.	"By the Rules"	Lambert; Blackmore; Manahan; Marston	Manahan	3:49
Total length:				57:45

UK and Asian digital edition bonus track
No.	Title	Writer(s)	Length
17.	"Map"	Lambert; McKee; Goldstein; Anne Preven	3:46
Total length:			1:01:31

Box set edition The box set edition of Trespassing includes:

- Six lithographs of Adam Lambert
- Trespassing vinyl LP in gatefold packaging
- Trespassing fan edition CD album and DVD with making-of and music videos, and track-by-track highlights

== Personnel ==
Adapted from AllMusic

Performers

- All vocals - Adam Lambert
  - Featured artist - Nile Rodgers, Sam Sparro

Musicians

- Keyboard - Lester Mendez
- Guitar - Dan Brigham, Tommy Joe Ratliff, Nile Rodger, Paul Shearer, Rune Westberg
  - Guitar engineer - Richard Hilton
- Cirkut
- Dr. Luke

Production

- A&R - Rani Hancock
- Arrangement - Andrew Coleman, Clint Gibbs, Skylar Mones
- Assistants - Eric Eylands, Fernando Lodeiro, Andrew Lufton, Rene Toledo Jr., Scott "Yarmov" Yarmovsky
- Digital editing - Andrew Coleman
- Editing - Skylar Mones, Joel Numa, Andy Selby
  - Vocal editing - Jenna Davis, Chris "Tek" O'Ryan, Andy Selby
- Engineers - Cary Clark, Andrew Coleman, Josh Crosby, Robert Marvin, Lester Mendez, Skylar Mones, Chris Sclafani, Ryan Williams, Emily Wright
  - Assistant engineers - Tim Roberts, Phil Seaford
- Mastering - Chris Gehringer
- Management - Dana Collins, Steve Jensen, Martin Kirkup
- Mixer – Serban Ghenea
  - Mixing engineer - John Hanes
- Producers - Josh Abraham, Cirkut, Josh Crosby, Dr. Luke, Lester Mendez, Oligee, The Smeezingtons, Rune Westberg, Pharrell Williams
  - Additional production - U-Tern
  - Executive producer - Adam Lambert
  - Vocal producer - Bonnie McKee, Emily Wright
- Production coordinators - Jeremy "J Boogs" Levin, Katie Mitzell, Irene Richter, David Silberstein
  - Coordination - Leah Reid

Imagery

- Creative director - Adam Lambert
- Design - Nike Chapman, Jeróme Curchod
- Makeup - Donald Simrock
- Photography - Lee Cherry, Florian Schneider
- Hair - Clyde Haygood, Abreea Loren Saunders
- Stylist - Douglas Van Lanningham

== Charts ==
=== Weekly charts ===
Weekly chart performance for Trespassing
Chart (2012)	Peak position
Austrian Albums (Ö3 Austria)	10
Australian Albums (ARIA)	28
Belgian Albums (Ultratop Flanders)	64
Belgian Albums (Ultratop Wallonia)	132
Brazilian Albums (ABPD)	8
Canadian Albums (Billboard)	1
Czech Albums (ČNS IFPI)	29
Danish Albums (Hitlisten)	10
Dutch Albums (Album Top 100)	30
Finnish Albums (Suomen virallinen lista)	2
German Albums (Offizielle Top 100)	28
Hungarian Albums (MAHASZ)	1
Japanese Albums (Oricon)	15
New Zealand Albums (RMNZ)	4
Norwegian Albums (VG-lista)	32
Portuguese Albums (AFP)	19
Scottish Albums (Official Charts)	18
South Korean Albums (Circle)	16
South Korean International Albums (Circle)	2
Swedish Albums (Sverigetopplistan)	20
Swiss Albums (Schweizer Hitparade)	35
UK Albums (Official Charts)	16
US Billboard 200	1

=== Year-end charts ===
Weekly chart performance for Trespassing
Chart (2012)	Position
Hungarian Albums (MAHASZ)	73
US Billboard 200	188

== Certifications ==
Certifications for "Trespassing"
Region	Certification	Certified units/sales
New Zealand (RMNZ)	Gold	7,500^{‡}
^{‡} Sales+streaming figures based on certification alone.

== Release history ==
Region	Date	Format(s)	Label
Finland	May 14, 2012	Digital download	Sony Music
United States	May 15, 2012	CD; digital download	RCA; 19
Australia	May 18, 2012	CD; digital download	Sony Music
Austria	May 18, 2012	CD; digital download	Sony Music
Germany	May 18, 2012	CD; digital download	Sony Music
Switzerland	May 18, 2012	CD; digital download	Sony Music
Japan	June 6, 2012	CD; CD+DVD; digital download	Sony Music Japan
United Kingdom	July 9, 2012	CD; digital download	RCA
