= Another Lonely Night (Adam Lambert song) =

Single by Adam Lambert

from the album The Original High
- Released: October 16, 2015
- Recorded: Stockholm, Sweden
- Genre: Dance
- Length: 3:45
- Label: Warner Bros.
- Songwriters: Adam Lambert; Sterling Fox; Max Martin; Ali Payami
- Producers: Martin; Payami

Adam Lambert singles chronology
| "Ghost Town" (2015) | "Another Lonely Night" (2015) | "Welcome to the Show" (2016) |

Music video
- "Another Lonely Night" on YouTube

"Another Lonely Night" is a song recorded by American singer Adam Lambert for his third studio album, The Original High (2015). It was released in October 2015 as the album's second single, and has charted at number 5 in the Polish Airplay Top 100 and 35 on the Dutch Top 40. It was serviced to US radio in November 2015 and an official remix package was released to digital retailers on December 4, 2015.

== Background ==
Another Lonely Night is the second single from his album The Original High. It was written by Lambert, Sterling Fox, Max Martin and Ali Payami, and produced by Martin and Payami. Payami performs bass, keyboards and percussion and programming on the record, while Sterling Fox provides background vocals; both his and Lambert's vocals were edited by Peter Carlsson, with engineering came from Sam Holland with assistance from Cory Bice and assistant mastering engineering from Randy Merrill.

== Critical reception ==
Entertainment Focus noted that the song "gives more than a passing nod to the 80s." The New York Times commended its "strategic restraint" and said that it "could have come from the Top Gun soundtrack."

== Music video ==
The music video premiered on October 9, 2015, and is directed by Luke Gilford. It depicts everyday events in the lives of four individuals in Las Vegas, Nevada: one employed as a singer in a nightclub, one as a chorus girl, one as a wedding officiant, and one as a male stripper. Each character performs for tourists but is depicted as lonely in their personal lives (though some have pets). One of the four individuals who star in the video is Gigi Gorgeous, a transgender actress.

== Live performances ==
The first live performance after the release as the second single was at 538Live XXL in the Ziggo Dome in Amsterdam on October 10, 2015. A few days later Lambert performed the song on the seven season of The X Factor Australia on October 20, 2015. Donning an animal-print jacket and a pompadour hairstyle, Lambert evoked the Elvis-impersonator character he had played in the "Another Lonely Night" video. Lambert performed the song during The Original High Tour.

== Track listing ==
All tracks are written by Adam Lambert, Sterling Fox, Max Martin, Ali Payami.

Remixes EP
| No. | Title | Length |
|---|---|---|
| 1. | "Another Lonely Night" (Pop Mix) | 3:30 |
| 2. | "Another Lonely Night" (Oliver Moldan Remix) | 5:36 |
| 3. | "Another Lonely Night" (Gorex Remix) | 3:28 |
| 4. | "Another Lonely Night" (M-22 Remix) | 4:51 |

== Charts ==
| Chart (2015–16) | Peak position |
|---|---|
| Australia (ARIA) | 107 |
| Czech Republic Airplay (ČNS IFPI) | 39 |
| Finland (Suomen virallinen lista) | 29 |
| Netherlands (Dutch Top 40) | 35 |
| Poland (Polish Airplay Top 100) | 5 |
| US Adult Pop Airplay (Billboard) | 25 |
| US Dance Club Songs (Billboard) | 3 |

== Certifications ==
| Region | Certification | Certified units/sales |
|---|---|---|
| Poland (ZPAV) | Gold | 25,000^{‡} |
^{‡} Sales+streaming figures based on certification alone.

== Release history ==
List of releases, showing the format and date of release.
| Country | Date | Format | Ref. |
|---|---|---|---|
| South Africa | October 2015 | Unknown | |
| United States | November 17, 2015 | Contemporary hit radio | |
| United States | November 17, 2015 | Hot adult contemporary | |
| Worldwide | December 4, 2015 | Digital download — Remixes EP | |
