= Sterling Fox =

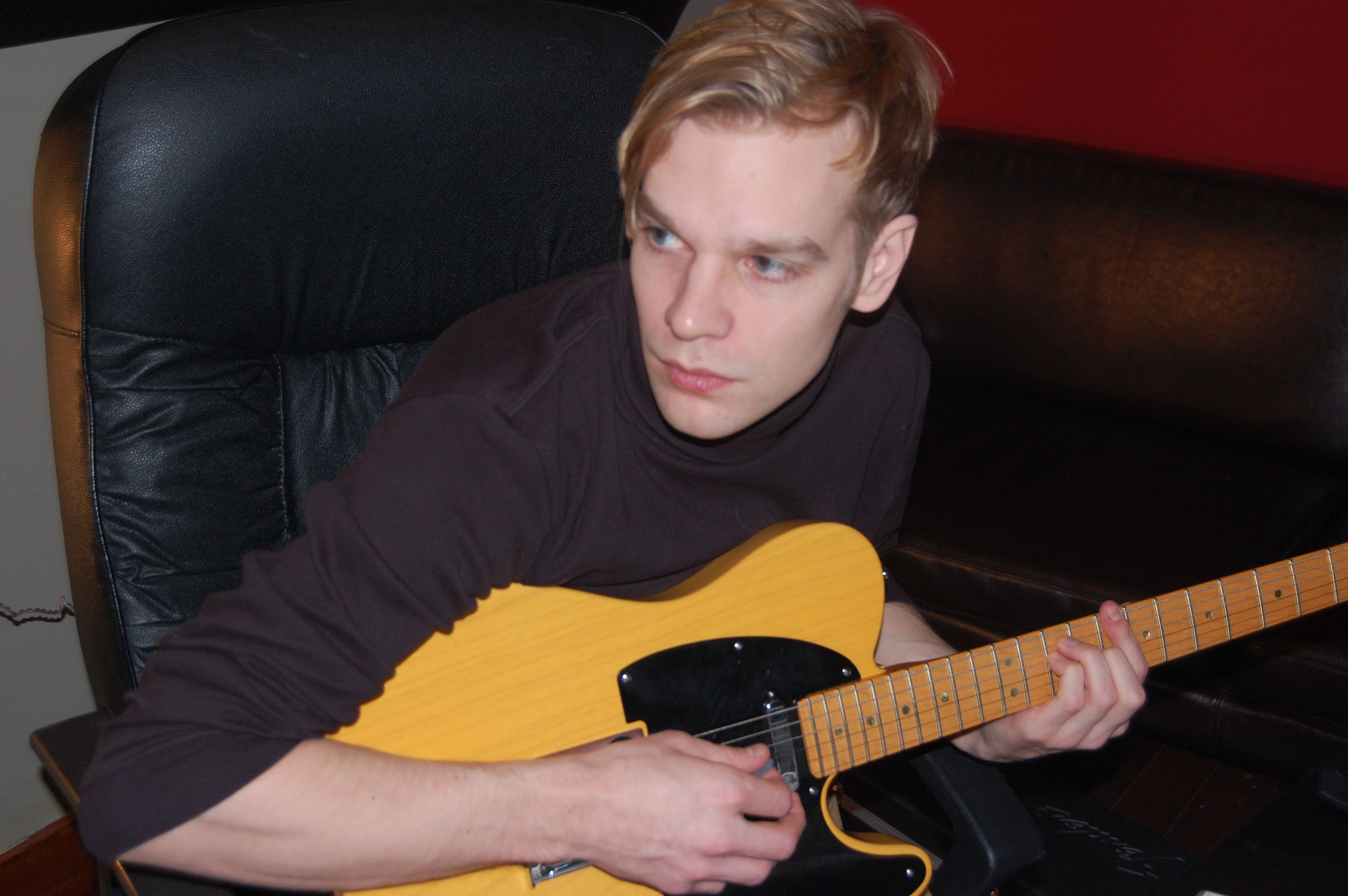

Background information
- Also known as: Brandon Lowry, Baby Fuzz
- Born: November 2, 1983 (age 41)
- Origin: Stoystown, Pennsylvania
- Occupation(s): Record producer songwriter musician Recording artist
- Years active: 2007–present
- Labels: Silver Scream Records, Blanket Fort

Brandon Lowry (born November 2, 1983), better known by his stage name Sterling Fox, is an American songwriter, record producer and recording artist. He has written and produced multiple #1 songs.

== Life and Times ==
Brandon Lowry grew up in Stoystown, Pennsylvania. In his early years, Brandon studied piano and experimented with bootleg tape recording. His father worked in a factory and coal plant to support the family. After high school, Lowry studied classical piano at Duquesne University. He graduated from college, and after an early stint as a cruise ship pianist, Lowry's musical career came to fruition in 2007 after moving to New York City. He quickly came into demand as a session player, songwriter, and music producer. In 2008, he co-founded a music production team Robopop with Daniel Omelio. Soon after, Robopop went on to cowrite and coproduce "Stereo Hearts" by Gym Class Heroes, featuring Adam Levine. The record was certified 3× platinum in the United States, 3× platinum in Australia and 2× platinum in Canada and reached #1 on the Billboard US Pop Songs Chart.

After the success of "Stereo Hearts", Robopop coproduced the song "Video Games", the first breakout release from artist Lana Del Rey. "Video Games" was a huge success and its album Born to Die has gone on to sell over 5,000,000 units worldwide. Lowry also played the piano part on the recording and was credited as a mixing engineer. After "Video Games", Lowry split off from Robopop and reemerged under a new alter ego Sterling Fox.

In 2013, Sterling cowrote the dance crossover hit "Take Me Home" by Cash Cash, which was certified gold in the US and reach #5 in the UK. In 2014, Sterling produced and cowrote the #1 iTunes hit single "Wasted Love" for The Voice Season 7 finalist Matt McAndrew.

As a vocalist, Fox has worked on a number of electronic collaborations, including cowriting and singing the song "Shame on Me" from Avicii's album True and also writing and singing the song "Talk to Myself" from Avicii's 2nd album Stories.

In 2015, he cowrote the Adam Lambert single Ghost Town with Max Martin, which would go on to become certified Gold in the US. He also added the whistle part to the hook.

Fox would also contribute writing to Where the Devil Don't Go for Elle King's album Love Stuff, which became one of the top selling Rock albums of the year. In 2016, it was featured in the Season 4 theatrical trailer for Orange is the New Black.

In 2016, he cowrote "Man on the Moon" and "If I'm Dancing" on the Britney Spears album Glory and additionally added guitar and background vocals on "Man on the Moon".

Over his career, he has written songs with the likes of Madonna, Max Martin, Julia Michaels, and others, and his works have been performed live by the likes of Queen, One Direction, and Maroon 5.

In 2017 Fox performed at SXSW and was subsequently threatened with arrest by festival coordinators for using a large collage of corporate logo parodies as his stage backdrop while street performing throughout the city.

Immediately after the inauguration of Donald Trump as US president, Lowry moved to Montreal, Canada for a year.

In 2018, Lowry retired his Sterling Fox pseudonym and introduced a new project called Baby Fuzz. Baby Fuzz released several singles and music videos in 2018 and 2019 to critical acclaim. In March 2019, Baby Fuzz independently released its debut album Plastic Paradise.

Lowry is currently still writing songs for others, running a small indie label Blanket Fort, and also touring and releasing music as Baby Fuzz.

== Discography ==
| Year | Artist(s) | Song | Album | Singer | Songwriter | Producer | Mixing Engineer | Charts and Certifications |
|---|---|---|---|---|---|---|---|---|
| 2011 | Gym Class Heroes ft. Adam Levine | Stereo Hearts | The Papercut Chronicles II | | check | check | | 4× Platinum, #1 at US Top 40 Radio, #1 US Pop Songs |
| 2011 | Alex Winston | Fingers and Toes | Sister Wife EP | | check | | | |
| 2011 | Dazzled Kid | The Day of My Escape | Fire Needs Air | | check | | | #14 Netherlands |
| 2011 | Marlon Roudette | City Like This | Matter Fixed | | | check | | #6 Album Germany |
| 2011 | Justin Nozuka feat. India Arie | Heartless | | | | check | check | |
| 2012 | Lana Del Rey | Video Games | Born to Die | | | check | check | 5× Platinum Album, #1 in the UK |
| 2012 | Niia | BTSTU | | | | check | check | #1 on Hype Machine |
| 2012 | Outasight | I'll Drink to That | Nights Like These | | check | check | | |
| 2013 | Cash Cash feat. Bebe Rexha | Take Me Home | | | check | | | #2 US Dance, #5 UK Singles, Certified Gold |
| 2013 | Avicii feat. Sterling Fox and Audra Mae | Shame on Me | True | check | check | | | #1 Australia and Sweden, #2 UK, #5 US, Gold Record |
| 2013 | Sterling Fox | Ghost | | check | check | check | | |
| 2014 | Kylie Minogue | Chasing Ghosts | Sleepwalker (EP) | | check | | | |
| 2014 | Tiesto feat. Cruikshank | Footprints | A Town Called Paradise | | check | | | #2 US Dance, #7 US Digital Albums |
| 2014 | Lindsey Stirling | Roundtable Rival | Shatter Me | | check | | | #1 Billboard Classical, #1 Billboard Dance, #1 US Independent Albums, #1 iTunes albums, Certified Gold |
| 2014 | Lindsey Stirling | Ascendance | Shatter Me | | check | | | #1 Billboard Classical, #1 Billboard Dance, #1 US Independent Albums, #1 iTunes albums, Certified Gold |
| 2014 | Tritonal and Paris Blohm feat. Sterling Fox | Colors | | check | check | | | #1 Beatport |
| 2014 | Sterling Fox | Holy | | check | check | check | | |
| 2014 | Boyz II Men | What Happens in Vegas | Collide | | check | | | #6 US R&B/Hip-Hop, #2 on Childhood Dreams Chart |
| 2014 | Matt McAndrew | Wasted Love | | | check | check | | #1 iTunes single, #14 Billboard Hot 100 |
| 2015 | Elle King | Where the Devil Don't Go | Love Stuff | | check | | | #27 Billboard Albums |
| 2015 | Sterling Fox | Freak Caroline | | check | check | check | check | remix #1 on Hype Machine |
| 2015 | Adam Lambert | Ghost Town | The Original High | | check | | | #3 Billboard 200, #2 Australia singles |
| 2015 | Adam Lambert | Evil in the Night | The Original High | | check | | | #3 Billboard 200 |
| 2015 | Adam Lambert | Another Lonely Night | The Original High | | check | | | #3 Billboard 200 |
| 2015 | Cazzette | Dancing With Your Ghost | Desserts | check | check | | | |
| 2015 | Doe Paoro | Growth/Decay | After | | check | | | |
| 2015 | Avicii ft. Sterling Fox | Talk to Myself | Stories | check | check | | | #1 Billboard Dance/Electronic Album |
| 2015 | Panama Wedding | Halfway to Heaven | Into Focus | | check | | | |
| 2015 | Sterling Fox and Samantha Ronson | Angry Sons | | check | check | check | | |
| 2016 | Britney Spears | Man on the Moon | Glory | | check | | | #3 Billboard Album |
| 2016 | Britney Spears | If I'm Dancing | Glory | | check | | | #3 Billboard Album |
| 2016 | Clams Casino feat. A$AP Rocky and Lil B | Be Somebody | 32 Levels | check | | | | |
| 2016 | Almand feat. PG-13 | Don't Manipulate | | | check | check | check | |
| 2017 | Starling | No Rest For the Wicked | The Body | | check | | | |
| 2017 | Youn Sun Nah | Traveller | She Moves On | | check | | | #21 France |
| 2017 | Loreen | Dreams | Ride | | check | | | #31 Sweden |
| 2017 | Baby Fuzz | Cig | | check | check | check | | |
| 2019 | Baby Fuzz | | Plastic Paradise | check | check | check | | |
| 2019 | Lauv | | Sims | | check | | | |
| 2019 | Lauv and Miquela | | Sims (Miquela Remix) | | check | | | |
