= Never Close Our Eyes =

Single by Adam Lambert

from the album Trespassing
- Released: April 14, 2012
- Studio: Conway Recording Studios, Eightysevenfourteen Studios, Henson Recording Studios, and Levcon Studios (Los Angeles, California)
- Genre: Electropop
- Length: 4:08
- Label: RCA
- Songwriters: Bruno Mars; Philip Lawrence; Ari Levine; Lukasz Gottwald; Henry Walter
- Producers: Dr. Luke; Cirkut; The Smeezingtons

Adam Lambert singles chronology
"Better Than I Know Myself" (2011)	"Never Close Our Eyes" (2012)	"Trespassing" (2012)

Music video
- "Never Close Our Eyes" on YouTube

"Never Close Our Eyes" is a song by American singer Adam Lambert from his second studio album, Trespassing. The song was written and produced by Bruno Mars, Philip Lawrence, Ari Levine, Dr. Luke, and Cirkut. It was released as the album's second single on April 14, 2012, and was met with glowing reviews for the most part, as critics praised it for being a much better offering than the previous single "Better Than I Know Myself". The single performed moderately well on the charts. Unlike past singles, "Never Close Our Eyes" is Lambert's first top 20 hit in the United Kingdom, debuting and peaking at number 17. The song is also Lambert's second US top 10 club hit, peaking at number six on the chart.

== Background and release ==
After the moderate impact that "Better Than I Know Myself" had on the charts, Lambert postponed his second album Trespassing for a May release. Lambert later announced on April 11, 2012, that "Never Close Our Eyes" would be the second single and included a photo of the single's artwork. The song premiered the following day through his SoundCloud profile. The song was released on April 16, 2012.

== Composition ==
"Never Close Our Eyes" was written by Bruno Mars, Philip Lawrence, Ari Levine, Henry Walter, Lukasz Gottwald, all of whom also helmed production for the track, with Gottwald and Walter working under their respective production names Dr. Luke and Cirkut, and Mars, Lawrence, and Levine working in their production team, The Smeezingtons. It is an electropop song, with strong elements of dance-pop and Europop. As noted by Scott Shetler of Pop Crush, the track features a hint of Dr. Luke's up-tempo dance sound while retaining Bruno Mars' melodic pop sensibility.

Lyrically, the carpe diem-themed song is about living life to the fullest and partying until the break of dawn. The song is also about enjoying time with a special someone. In the chorus, Lambert sings: "But you know I wish that this night would never be over/ There's plenty of time to sleep when we die/ So let's just stay awake until we grow older/ If I had my way we'd never close our eyes, our eyes, never!". According to Lambert himself, the song is "about all of US. A community. A movement."

== Critical reception ==
Contessa Gayles of AOL Music Blog called the song an "infectious dance track", while TJ of NeomLimelight called Lambert's vocals "impeccable". Writing for the MTV Buzzworthy blog, Jenna Rubenstein gave the song a positive review, writing: "Set to a pop-rooted dance beat, Adam's rock-tinged pipes carry the entire song as he sings about staying awake 24/7 to enjoy the hell out of his life." Joe Lynch of Fuse referred to the song as "magnificently theatrical," while writing that "'Never Close Our Eyes' is a satisfying negotiation between an electro-pop banger and romantic anthem. It's the kind of song that's tailored both for the dance floor and at home/in the car sing-alongs."

Jody Rosen of Rolling Stone gave the song three out of five stars, writing, "'Never Close Our Eyes' is that calculated – right down to the lyric, which aims for the same party-at-the-edge-of-doom vibe as recent smashes like 'I Gotta Feeling' and 'Till the World Ends' [...] The magnificence of his strident vocals defies all formulas and precepts, mathematical and otherwise." DJ Ron Slomowicz of About.com praised his voice, writing: "His voice carries a lot of strength, and when he hits the falsetto in 'Never Close Our Eyes', we are once again reminded of how well he handled those upper registers on his debut album." A negative review came from Katharine St. Asaph of Pop Dust, who wrote that "The prechorus, in particular, sounds like nobody could decide whether it called for a dubstep breakdown, spot of synth claps or Travie McCoy interjecting with his acoustic guitar." However she realized that "the problem's not him, it's the material–which is particularly baffling, considering there are at least five better singles on this thing. One of them is right after this."

The song was listed at number ten on Pop Crush's top 10 songs of the year so far.

== Music video ==
The music video was directed by Dori Oskowitz and premiered on May 29, 2012, on Lambert's official Vevo page. It shows Lambert in a monitored futuristic prison where prisoners are manipulated by pills that take away their individuality. Lambert, however, appears to be immune to the pills. When broken, the pills release a blue haze. In the course of the video, Lambert and some of the prisoners retaliate and escape the prison with a neon-soaked dance routine. The video ends with them running through the gates.

Speaking about the video, Lambert said, "The one thing that I was really excited about was maybe something sort of science fiction. Something kind of New World Order, in the future. Something not of this reality. When we put that out there, a gentleman called Dori Oskowitz came back with an amazing treatment. This director is a really cool guy, totally on the same page as me."

== Track listing ==
- Digital download
1. "Never Close Our Eyes" – 4:08
- Remixes
1. "Never Close Our Eyes" (Almighty Radio) – 3:57
2. "Never Close Our Eyes" (Almighty Club) – 6:34
3. "Never Close Our Eyes" (Almighty Dub) – 6:34
4. "Never Close Our Eyes" (Digital Dog Radio) – 4:25
5. "Never Close Our Eyes" (Digital Dog Club) – 7:41
6. "Never Close Our Eyes" (Digital Dog Dub) – 5:34
7. "Never Close Our Eyes" (Sunship Radio) – 3:13
8. "Never Close Our Eyes" (Sunship Extended) – 4:57
9. "Never Close Our Eyes" (Sunship Dub) – 5:12

== Charts ==
=== Weekly charts ===
Chart (2012)	Peak position
Austria (Ö3 Austria Top 40)	56
Belgium (Ultratip Bubbling Under Flanders)	14
Canada Hot 100 (Billboard)	62
Finland Download (Latauslista)	11
Hungary (Rádiós Top 40)	31
Japan (Japan Hot 100)	9
New Zealand (Recorded Music NZ)	24
Russia Airplay (TopHit)	17
Slovakia Airplay (ČNS IFPI)	33
UK Singles (Official Charts)	17
Ukraine Airplay (TopHit)	85
US Bubbling Under Hot 100 (Billboard)	10
US Adult Pop Airplay (Billboard)	35
US Dance Club Songs (Billboard)	6

=== Year-end charts ===
Year-end chart performance for "Never Close Our Eyes"
Chart (2012)	Position
Russia Airplay (TopHit)	92

== Radio and release history ==
Country	Date	Format	Label
Finland	April 14, 2012	Digital download	19 Recordings; RCA Records
United States	April 17, 2012	Digital download	19 Recordings; RCA Records
United States	May 29, 2012	Mainstream radio airplay	19 Recordings; RCA Records
United Kingdom	July 8, 2012	Digital download	19 Recordings; RCA Records
