= Trespassing (song) =

Single by Adam Lambert

from the album Trespassing
- Released: October 8, 2012
- Length: 3:29
- Label: 19; RCA
- Songwriters: Adam Lambert; Pharrell Williams
- Producer: Pharrell Williams

Adam Lambert singles chronology
"Never Close Our Eyes" (2012)	"Trespassing" (2012)	"Ghost Town" (2015)

Lyric video
- "Adam Lambert - Trespassing (Official Lyric Video)" on YouTube

"Trespassing" is a song by American singer Adam Lambert from his second studio album, Trespassing. The song was released as the album's third and final single on October 8, 2012. It was written and produced by Pharrell Williams. It received generally favorable reviews from critics and fans. The song peaked at number 92 on the Canadian Hot 100 chart, and peaked at number 33 on the US Hot Dance Club Songs chart.

== Background and release ==
On September 5, 2012, after much speculation and a leak of the news by a Dallas radio station, Lambert confirmed on Twitter that "Trespassing", written by himself and Pharrell Williams, would be the next single. The announcement was accompanied by a contest, in which Lambert asked fans to create and submit videos of themselves performing the song. A lyric video for "Trespassing", featuring the album's signature black and yellow colors, was uploaded on the singer's Vevo account on October 4, 2012. The song was officially released to radio on October 8. An eight-track Trespassing EP was released digitally on October 16, with a hard copy/digital download combination available from Lambert's official site. The EP included remixes of "Trespassing" by Pharrell Williams, Benny Benassi, Zak Waters, and vAnity mAchine; "Never Close Our Eyes" by R3hab, Mig & Mike Rizzo; "Better Than I Know Myself" by Robert Marvin and Shearer; and "Pop That Lock" by Johnny Labs. "Trespassing" peaked at number 38 on the Hungarian Airplay Chart No official music video was made for the song.

== Critical reception ==
Jim Farber of New York Daily News praised the production of album and the song, too, writing "Williams does best by Lambert in the title track, which smartly riffs off the rhythm of Queen’s “Another One Bites the Dust.” Hollywood Reporter editor Shirley Harpelin called it "classic (winning) combination of foot stomps." Newsday editor Glenn Gamboa compared this song with "Another One Bites the Dust" and "Hollaback Girl" but added that "the way Lambert whirls it all together, it sounds completely his." Slant Magazine praised the song: "Both tracks are among Williams's strongest work in years, and they represent a clever, on-point blend of some of Lambert's most obvious influences." USA Today editor Brian Mansfield highlighted and complimented: "For an artist (and an audience) that prides itself on pushing boundaries, this song's an audacious opening volley." In his review of album Stephen Thomas Erlewine wrote that it grabs attention and highlighted it.

Billboard also positively called it "startling, stomping, altogether tremendous opening." PopMatters called this song "funky march."

== Charts ==
Chart (2012)	Peak position
Canada (Canadian Hot 100)	92
Hungary (Rádiós Top 40)	38
US Hot Dance Club Songs (Billboard)	33

== Radio and release history ==
Country	Date	Format	Label
United States	October 8, 2012	Contemporary hit radio	19
United States	October 16, 2012	Digital download	RCA
